= Encumbered Estates' Court =

Former court in Ireland

Incumbered Estates (Ireland) Act 1849
- Act of Parliament
- Parliament of the United Kingdom
- Long title: An Act further to facilitate the Sale and Transfer of Incumbered Estates in Ireland.
- Citation: 12 & 13 Vict. c. 77
- Territorial extent: Ireland (Note: Section 55.)

Dates
- Royal assent: 28 July 1849
- Commencement: 28 July 1849 (Note: The Acts of Parliament (Commencement) Act 1793.)
- Repealed: 11 August 1875
Other legislation
Repealed by	Statute Law Revision Act 1875

Status: Repealed

Text of statute as originally enacted

The Encumbered Estates' Court was established in 1849 by the Incumbered Estates (Ireland) Act 1849 (12 & 13 Vict. c. 77), an act of the Parliament of the United Kingdom, to facilitate the sale of Irish estates whose owners, because of the Great Famine, were unable to meet their obligations. It was given authority to sell estates on application from either the owner or an encumbrancer (somebody who had a claim on it) and, after the sale, distribute the proceeds among the creditors, granting clear title to the new owners.

Frequently over-mortgaged (Note: In that era, a mortgage was much more likely to have been taken out by an existing owner pledging his property as collateral for a loan, rather than the modern sense of taking out a mortgage to buy a new property.) land belonged to trustees holding it for the benefit of one or more occupiers, with the last in line holding an "entail" that stopped the land being sold. The 1849 act allowed this court to order sales of the land by ignoring entails.

The economic need for the court was caused by the impoverishment of many Irish tenant farmers during the 1840s famine, that made it impossible for them to pay their rents as agreed to a landlord, and in turn he could not make his mortgage payments. Until this court was established, the lending bank could not get a court order to sell the mortgaged land because of the entail.

An example of this is with the trustees of the estate of William Mellish, whose daughter Margaret had married the 2nd Earl of Glengall with a substantial inheritance. The trustees challenged the behaviour of the earl in 1847, and he was declared bankrupt in the same year. The trustees were able to sell much of the family estates in Ireland in 1853 through the Encumbered Estates' Court, although much of it was subsequently bought back.

In 1858, the court's functions were assumed by the Landed Estates Court. The Supreme Court of Judicature Act (Ireland) 1877 (40 & 41 Vict. c. 57) abolished this court and made its judges Land Judges of the Chancery Division of the Supreme Court of Judicature. Responsibility for administration and initial proceedings was then transferred from the courts to the Land Commission, set up under the Land Law (Ireland) Act 1881 (44 & 45 Vict. c. 49).

== Subsequent developments ==
The whole act was repealed by section 1 of, and the schedule to, the Statute Law Revision Act 1875 (38 & 39 Vict. c. 66), which came into force on 11 August 1875.

== See also ==
- West Indian Incumbered Estates Acts
