= January 1908 Irish representative peer election =

Election to the British House of Lords

- 21 January 1908

134 ballots issued
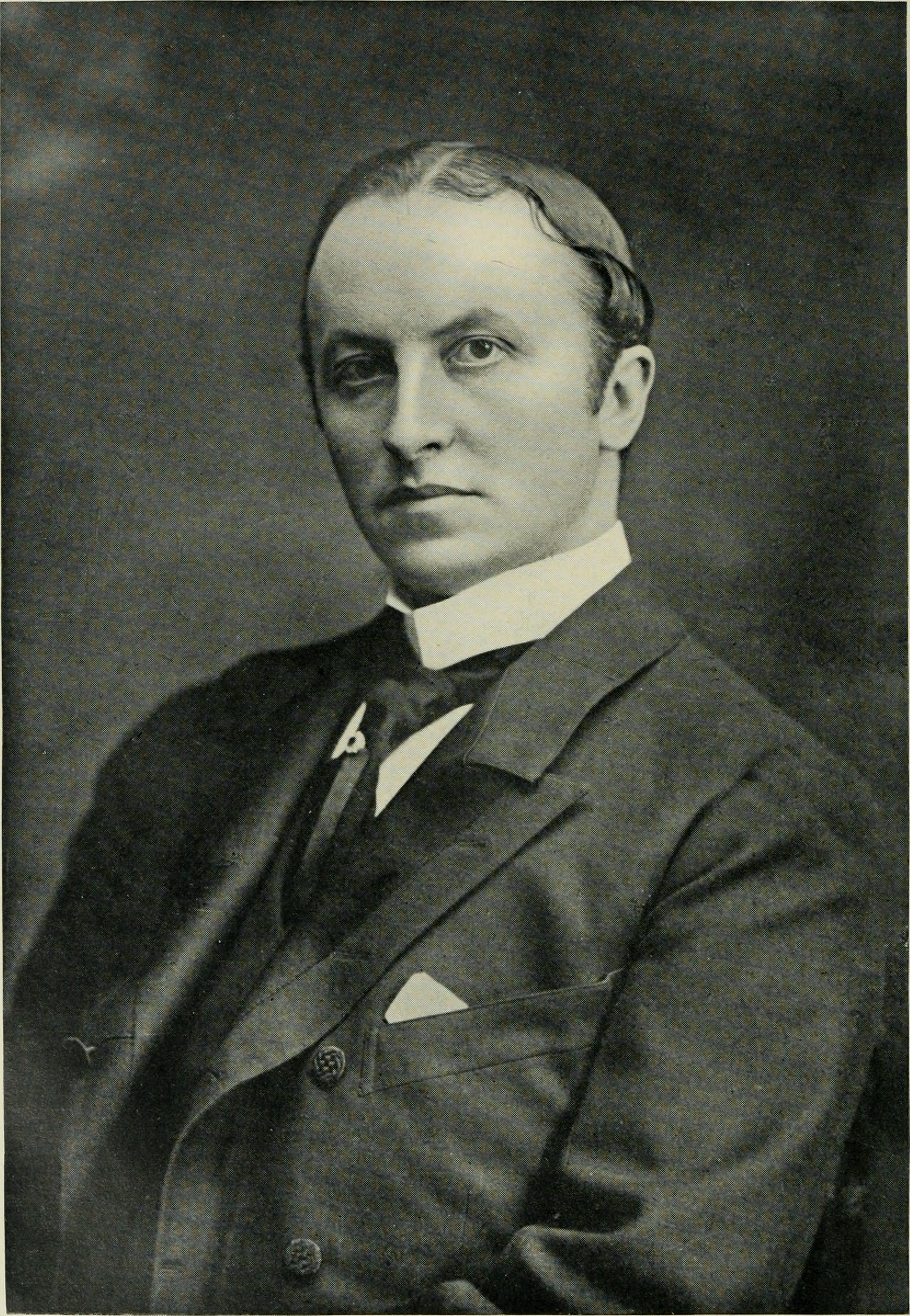

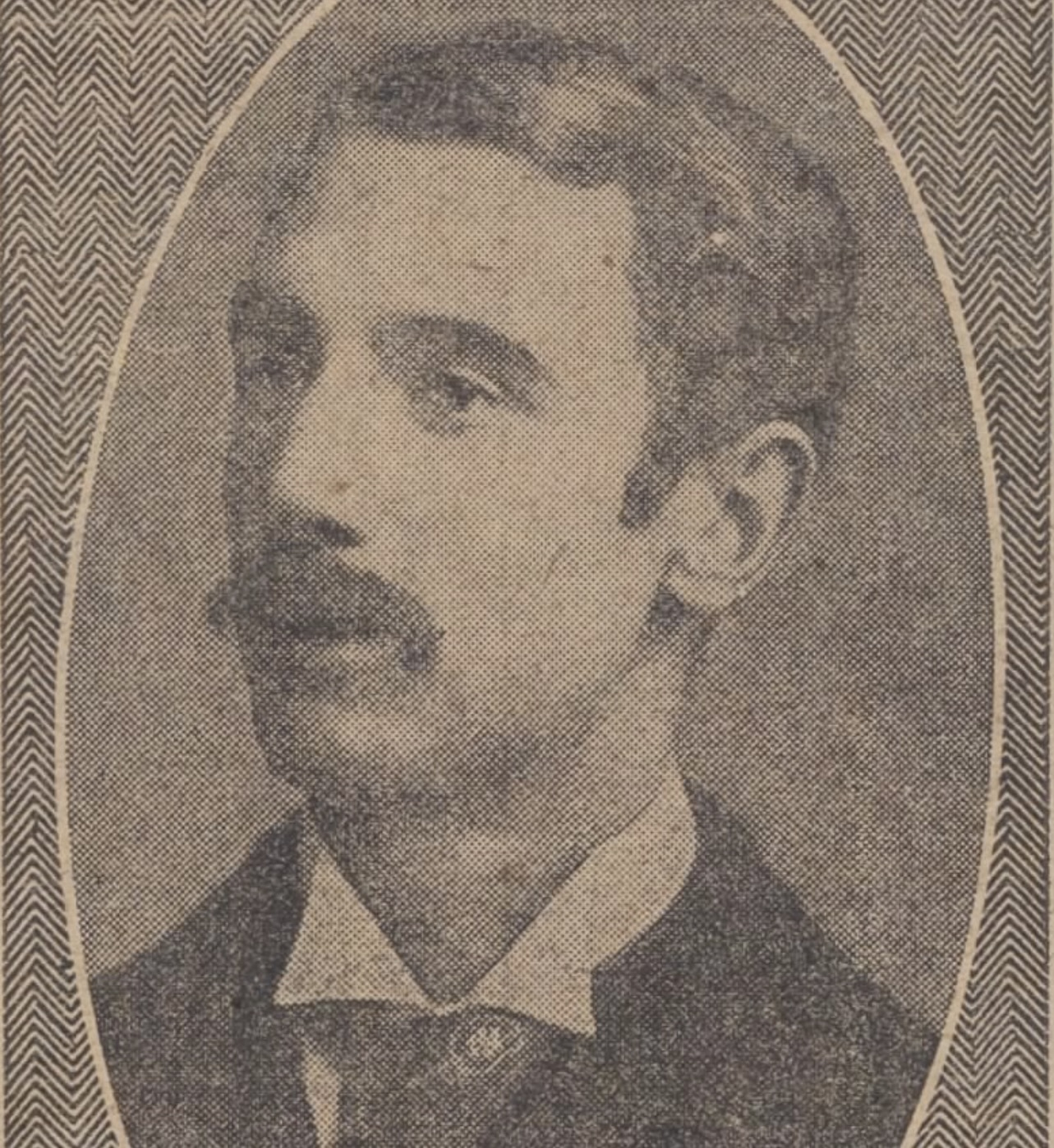

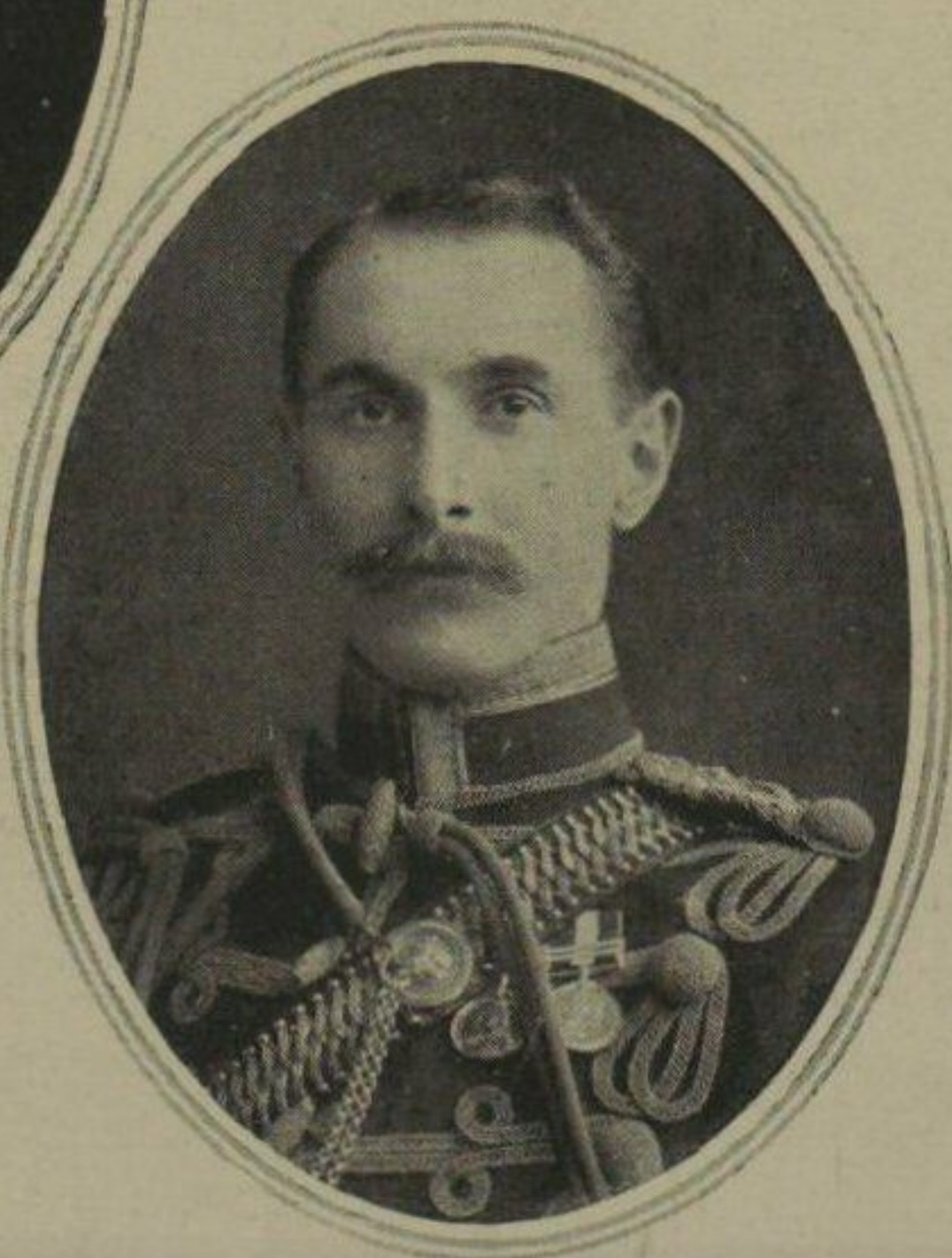
Nominee	Lord Curzon	Lord Ashtown	Lord Farnham
Popular vote	Winner	2 votes behind	4 votes behind
Irish representative peer before election
Lord Kilmaine (deceased)
Elected Irish representative peer
Lord Curzon

The January 1908 Irish representative peer election was held to fill a vacancy among the 28 Irish representative peers at that time elected to the British House of Lords. Conducted by post, with ballots sent to the 134 holders of Irish peerages eligible to vote, the election was necessitated by the death of Francis Browne, 4th Baron Kilmaine. It resulted in the election of Lord Curzon, the former viceroy of India. Curzon narrowly defeated Frederick Trench, 3rd Baron Ashtown, and Arthur Maxwell, 11th Baron Farnham. Curzon's eligibility for election was questioned, but the House of Lords seated him.

Curzon was an Englishman who had been granted an Irish peerage to give him a title before beginning his position as viceroy; he had never been to Ireland and owned no property there. He contested the election as a means of returning to parliament after being denied a United Kingdom peerage by the prime minister, Sir Henry Campbell-Bannerman. The fact that Curzon was not Irish sparked opposition, and his late entry into the race worked against him. As he had never asked the House of Lords to affirm his right to vote in Irish representative peer elections, something required to vote in them, some argued that this made him ineligible to be elected.

Curzon headed the poll with two votes more than Ashtown, who had two votes more than Farnham, but the official return noted that Curzon was not among those eligible to vote and that Ashtown had gained the most votes among those eligible to vote. When the House of Lords convened, the Lord Chancellor, Lord Loreburn, ruled that the requirement did not apply to candidates and declared Curzon the winner.

Ashtown and Farnham tied in the next election, in November 1908. Ashtown won the election when his name was drawn from a glass before the House of Lords, the procedure mandated by the Acts of Union 1800, but Farnham was chosen to fill the next vacancy, also in 1908.

== Background ==
The Acts of Union 1800, by which Great Britain and Ireland merged into one kingdom, terminated the old House of Lords of Ireland but provided for Irish representation in the House of Lords of the United Kingdom. Elected at that time were 28 members of the Irish peerage who (at the time of their election to the House of Lords) were not also peers of the United Kingdom. These served for life as Irish representative peers. As the representative peers died, they were replaced by a vote of the entire Irish peerage, including those lords who also held a United Kingdom title. This was a small constituency—in 1800, there were 239 Irish peers, a figure which gradually decreased to 182 by 1883.

By the early 20th century, the House of Lords of the United Kingdom, one house of the Parliament of the United Kingdom, consisted mainly of several hundred hereditary peers, (Note: Those with English, Great Britain or United Kingdom peerages had the right to vote in the British House of Lords at the time, together with the 28 Irish representative peers elected for life, 16 Scottish representative peers elected each parliament, the two archbishops and 24 bishops, and the Law Lords.) along with 28 Irish representative peers and certain others, such as some Anglican archbishops and bishops. An Irish representative peer could not resign once elected, nor would promotion to a peerage of the United Kingdom end his tenure as a representative peer; only death or disqualification to sit in parliament, including bankruptcy, would vacate his place. As of December 1909, there were 65 Irish peers with no seat in the House of Lords.

The law provided that upon receiving the death certificate for an Irish representative peer (signed by two lords temporal of the House of Lords), the lord chancellor would instruct the lord chancellor of Ireland to have the clerk of the crown and hanaper conduct an election. Each of the eligible voters would receive a ballot in duplicate by post with a space for the name of the peer whom the voter desired to elect. The ballot was to be signed with the voter's seal affixed and returned to the Crown Office in Dublin within 30 days (Note: The Acts of Union prescribed 52 days, but this was reduced to 30 in 1882. There was no prohibition on peers voting for themselves.) from the date of the issuance of the writ. Before filling out the ballot, the voter had to appear before a judge of England or Ireland, a justice of the peace for any Irish borough or county, or, if abroad, an ambassador or secretary of an embassy, and take the oath of allegiance. This made it inconvenient for Irish peers to vote, and some did not.

Elections for Irish representative peers lapsed with the Irish Free State's establishment in 1922. Although the existing Irish representative peers retained their seats for life, there was no longer a lord chancellor of Ireland or a hanaper to conduct elections. Still, the lord chancellor in London continued to receive documents asserting the right to vote in elections for Irish representative peer, and, following the death of the last surviving Irish representative peer, Lord Kilmorey in 1961, Irish peers petitioned the House of Lords for a declaration that they still had the right to elect 28 representatives. This was denied; one member of the Committee for Privileges declared that the right had ended when the Irish Free State left the United Kingdom, another stated that the end of the offices of lord chancellor for Ireland and hanaper meant no election could take place. The provisions regarding Irish representative peers were removed from the statute book by the Statute Law (Repeals) Act 1971.

== Candidates and campaign ==
On 9 November 1907, Francis Browne, 4th Baron Kilmaine, an Irish representative peer since 1890, died in Paris. Writs were subsequently issued in the election for a successor as representative peer, returnable 20 January 1908. The press mentioned Ivo Bligh, 8th Earl of Darnley (who had already been elected an Irish representative peer in 1905 and thus had no need to stand) and John Bingham, 5th Baron Clanmorris as possible successors. 134 ballots were sent to eligible peers.

In the newspapers of 30 December 1907, it was announced that Lord Curzon, the former viceroy of India, would seek the office, and had sent letters to the Irish peers asking for their votes. The former MP for Southport, Curzon had been granted a peerage because it was thought that the viceroy and representative of Queen Victoria, the empress of India, should be a peer, and so he had in 1898 accepted the first Irish peerage to be created since 1868 (and, as it proved, the last ever created). This gave the new viceroy a lordly title as he took up his position, rather than serving as a commoner. The eldest son and heir of Baron Scarsdale, Curzon contemplated a return to the House of Commons after his time as viceroy. Curzon had taken an Irish peerage at the suggestion of the prime minister, Lord Salisbury, who pointed out that Irish peers lacking membership of the House of Lords could stand for the House of Commons. Despite Curzon's having no Irish property or connections, in September 1898 Victoria conferred on him the title of Baron Curzon of Kedleston, (Note: The territorial designation is from Kedleston Hall, the Curzon family seat in England.) in the peerage of Ireland.

Curzon resigned as viceroy in 1905, an action sparked by his conflict with the Commander-in-Chief, India, General Lord Kitchener. On Curzon's return to Britain, he felt that his health would not permit him to seek a return to the Commons, and King Edward VII considered it marred the dignity of the viceregal office for a recent viceroy to fight for a seat in the Commons. Although Edward wanted Curzon to be given an earldom, the prime minister, Arthur Balfour, opposed this, or at least wanted the matter postponed to January or February 1906, fearing that an immediate honour for Curzon would be seen as vindication in the dispute with Kitchener, in which Balfour considered Curzon in the wrong. But Balfour resigned in December 1905. The new prime minister, Sir Henry Campbell-Bannerman, also refused Curzon an earldom or another United Kingdom peerage that would permit him, like other former viceroys, to sit in the House of Lords. (Note: Given that Curzon's own Conservative Party (also known at that time as the Unionists) had refused to give him an honour, Campbell-Bannerman's Liberals saw no reason to do so.) The Unionist leader in the House of Lords, Lord Lansdowne suggested Curzon seek to become an Irish representative peer in place of Lord Kilmaine, and two prominent noblemen of the Irish peerage, the Duke of Abercorn and the Marquess of Londonderry, were willing to back Curzon for the position although Curzon had never been to Ireland.

In his letter to the voters, Curzon tried to answer concerns that he was unfamiliar with Irish issues such as land tenure, and asked that the voters look with favour on his candidacy as the only way he could see to re-enter public life. Curzon's candidacy was regarded by Unionists in Dublin with considerable satisfaction; his backers told the Irish peers his presence would boost the Unionist strength in the House of Lords. Despite this support, some opposed Curzon's candidacy, as a non-Irishman who had no real interest in Irish affairs. The Manchester Guardian thought it fitting that Curzon had been backed by Abercorn and Londonderry, stating that the Duke was of a Scottish family and that "Lord Londonderry is no more Irish than the German Emperor". Some peers had already cast their ballots when he entered the race, and others objected because Curzon, as heir to a British title, would retain his status as an Irish representative peer on his succession, thereby diminishing Irish representation at Westminster for Curzon's lifetime.

Within a week of the announcement, the press stated that Curzon would be opposed by Frederick Trench, 3rd Baron Ashtown, Arthur Maxwell, 11th Baron Farnham, and Yvo Vesey, 5th Viscount de Vesci. Lord de Vesci, though, quickly dropped out of the race and expressed his support for Curzon. Ashtown, an outspoken Unionist, had been born in 1868, and succeeded to the title in 1880 upon his grandfather's death. He had a contentious relationship with his Irish tenantry, including replacing local labourers with Scots, leading to a boycott against him and the explosion of a bomb near his home in Waterford in 1904. He blamed the bombing on supporters of the boycott but was also accused of planting it, though this was never proved. Farnham had been born in 1879, had served in the 10th Hussars and had succeeded to his title in 1900. When asked if he was still a candidate, Farnham replied that he was, as many of his supporters had already voted for him.

Of course no one would grudge Lord Curzon in his own person a seat either in the House of Commons or in the House of Lords. His ability and position would commend him to either assembly. But he comes to us in so questionable a shape as to amaze both countries by a feat of constitutional acrobatics. He affords the Liberals a captivating argument for the reform of the Upper Chamber while Irish Nationalists are reinforced by the further demonstration of the absurdity of the Act of Union.

— Timothy Healy MP

Viscount Charlemont backed Curzon, stating, "The present government of Ireland is so disgraceful that Lord Curzon will be of material use in the Upper Chamber." The Earl of Darnley (who was an Irish representative peer), the Earl of Norbury, Viscount Chetwynd and Lord Rathdonnell all stated their support for Curzon, as did Lord Kingsale, Viscount Bangor and Viscount Massereene. The Earl of Cavan favoured Curzon's candidacy but had already voted by the time he heard of it; this was also true of Lord Clonbrock. Viscount Hawarden also had voted, but considered Curzon's candidacy unfair to peers who had been waiting years for the honour. Viscount Dillon wrote to three candidates, including Curzon, that since his "happy release from that country", he had ceased to vote for Irish representative peer. Viscount Harberton also hoped to see Curzon elected, but "for myself, I have long since ceased to vote for the Irish Representative Peerage, as I am unable to take the thing seriously".

Once it was plain that Curzon would be opposed, Lansdowne suggested he withdraw, stating "it would be ridiculous to run you against an obscure Irishman". Curzon, though, insisted on standing, feeling he had spent long enough in the political wilderness. One issue in the campaign was whether Curzon was eligible for election; although he had been an Irish peer for nine years, he had never voted in Irish representative peer elections, nor asked the House of Lords to establish his right to vote. Those questioning his eligibility cited Article VIII of the Act of Union, which stated, "the temporal peers of Ireland shall in the manner hereafter provided choose another peer out of their own number to supply the place so vacant", for the proposition that the elected person must be one of the peers who had claimed his right to vote in such elections. Curzon was one of 38 peers who held titles entitling them to vote in the election who had not claimed their right to vote before the Lords; while some of these were minors not yet eligible to vote, they also included Lord Carrington, a member of the Cabinet. The Kerry News reported that the former prime minister, Lord Palmerston, an Irish peer who had sat in the House of Commons, had never attempted to establish his right to vote in the elections for fear that his political adversaries would force him to the House of Lords.

The MP for Liverpool Scotland, T. P. O'Connor, wrote that the election was of no concern to the people of Ireland since the Irish representative peers represented only themselves, and few if any were Irish nationalists which 80 percent of Irish constituencies were represented by. The Freeman's Journal of Dublin pointed out that on the death of Curzon's elderly father, he would enter the House of Lords anyway, "Practically, the decision of the Irish peers does not matter a pin's point to Ireland. The number of them who exhibit Irish patriotism of any kind or degree are an insignificant minority. Very many of them have as little connection with Ireland as Lord Curzon himself."

== Election ==
Curzon is the exception who proves the rule. In spite of all the influence which the Conservative Party could bring to bear, and circular letters from leading Irish Conservatives like the 2nd Duke of Abercorn, the candidature of an outsider was so resented by the largely Conservative Irish peerage that Curzon got in by a majority of only two after a fierce, three-cornered contest the like of which had not been seen since 1825.

— A.P.W. Malcomson, "The Irish Peerage and the Act of Union, 1800–1971" (2000)

The January 1908 election, like the one later that year in November, attracted a high turnout from the voters. Given that he had been told by several peers that they had already voted or pledged their ballots before his entry into the race, Curzon expected to lose. But he headed the poll, receiving two more votes than Ashtown, who received two more votes than Farnham. The announcement of the election result, printed in The Dublin Gazette on 21 January 1908, stated that Curzon had received the greatest number of votes, but noted that his name did not appear on the roll of peers eligible to vote. The return stated that Ashtown had received the second most votes, and his name did appear on the roll. This left the matter of Curzon's eligibility for the House of Lords to decide.

It was not clear whether the Lord Chancellor, the presiding officer in the House of Lords, would make that decision, or whether it would be referred to a committee. The Irish Times was confident that Curzon would be seated, and stated that "in any case, no future development can diminish the value of the very high compliment which has been paid to him by the Irish peers." The Globe and The Pall Mall Gazette, writing in anticipation of Curzon's victory, expressed satisfaction at it. The Westminster Gazette noted that it would have preferred to see Curzon in the House of Commons rather than in the Lords, and noted, "The Irish representation has been used not to get Irish opinion represented but to provide a Unionist stalwart with a seat—a wholly different thing".

Meanwhile Lord Curzon’s election adds one more instance to the anomalies of everything Irish. He was made an Irish Peer because he wanted at once to be, and not to be, a Peer, and he is now made an Irish Representative Peer, although he is not Irish, and because he wants to be a Peer before his natural time. The Irish Peerage in his case has been an instrument successively of his avoiding entrance into the House of Lords and of securing it when he changed his mind.

— "Lord Curzon's Election", Irish Independent (reproduced from Daily Chronicle), 21 January 1908, page 6.

When parliament assembled on 29 January 1908, the King's Speech was first delivered by Edward VII in the House of Lords, after which several lords took the oath. Then, the writ and return stating that Lord Curzon had gained the greatest number of votes in the election, with Lord Ashtown second, were placed before the House of Lords. The Lord Chancellor, Lord Loreburn, then ruled that the Act of Union, though it required that the peers voting in an election for Irish representative peers had claimed a right to vote, and had that claim upheld by the House of Lords, did not require the same for the person elected. Accordingly, Lord Curzon, whose name appeared on the list of Irish peers, could be elected. This was concurred in by the former chancellor, Lord Halsbury, after which Curzon took the oath. Using a privilege of the eldest sons of peers, Curzon had been standing on the steps of the throne; once he had taken the oath, he took a seat on the front bench of the Opposition (Conservative) side, to cheering from that side. The following day, Curzon petitioned for the right to vote in elections for Irish representative peers, and that petition was granted.

== Aftermath ==
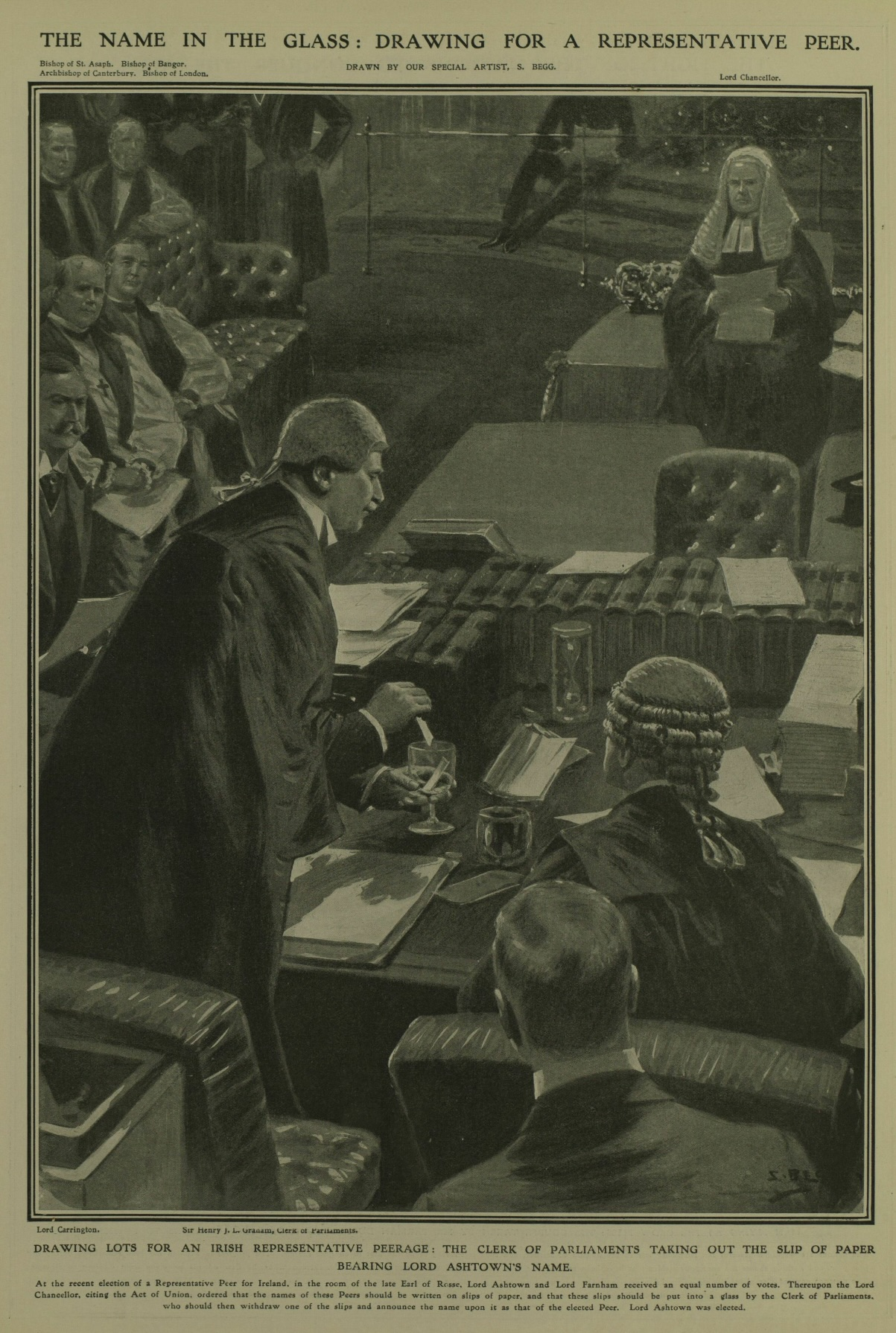
The name of Lord Ashtown is drawn to win the November 1908 election.

Lawrence Parsons, 4th Earl of Rosse, an Irish representative peer, died in August 1908. The press named Ashtown and Farnham as the likely candidates to replace him. On 2 November 1908, Joseph Nugent Lentaigne, the clerk of the crown and hanaper, certified that Ashtown and Farnham had received an equal number of votes. This was the only time an election for Irish representative peer resulted in a tie. Lentaigne travelled to London to place the election return before the House of Lords. Under a procedure set forth in the Act of Union, papers containing the name of each peer were placed in an ordinary wine glass before the House of Lords on 4 November 1908. Lord Ashtown's name was drawn by the Clerk of the Parliaments, and he was declared elected.

By the time of the November election, another Irish representative peer, Ponsonby Moore, 9th Earl of Drogheda, had died, and Farnham was elected in his place in December 1908. Ashtown was deprived of his place in the House of Lords in 1915 because of his bankruptcy. Curzon was granted a United Kingdom peerage in 1911. This did not affect his status as an Irish representative peer, and he remained in the House of Lords until his death in 1925.

Curzon is the only non-resident of Ireland ever elected an Irish representative peer. No Irish representative peers were elected after the establishment of the Irish Free State in 1922; those already elected were allowed to continue in the House of Lords. Farnham lived until 1957, and with his death, only three Irish representative peers remained; the last died in 1961.

== Sources ==
- Journals of the House of Lords. Vol. CXL. London: Eyre & Spottiswood, Limited. 1908.
- Parliamentary Debates, Fourth Series. Vol. CLXXXIII. London: Wyman and Sons, Limited. 1908.
- Anson, Sir William R. (1909). The Law and Custom of the Constitution. Vol. 1 (Fourth ed.). Oxford: The Clarendon Press. OCLC 908983726.
- Gilmour, David (2019) [1994]. Curzon: Imperial Statesman (eBook ed.). New York: Penguin Books. ISBN 978-0-141-99087-3.
- Hogan, Albert E. (1917) [1908]. The Government of the United Kingdom, its Colonies and Dependencies (3rd ed.). London: W. B. Clive. OCLC 17898808.
- Malcomson, A. P. W. (2000). "The Irish Peerage and the Act of Union, 1800–1971". Transactions of the Royal Historical Society. 10: 289–327. doi:10.1017/S0080440100000141. JSTOR 3679383.
- Mosley, Leonard Oswald (1960). The Glorious Fault: The Life of Lord Curzon. New York: Harcourt, Brace. OCLC 396977.
- Rose, Kenneth (1970). Superior Person: A Portrait of Curzon and His Circle in Late Victorian England. New York: Weidenfeld & Nicolson. ISBN 978-1-84212-233-4.
- Thesiger, Edward P. (December 1909). "The House of Lords: Its Powers, Duties and Procedures". The Empire Review: 289–307.
- Young, Kenneth (1963). Arthur James Balfour: The Happy Life of the Politician, Prime Minister, Statesman and Philosopher, 1848–1930. London: G. Bell and Sons. OCLC 1627683.
- Zetland, Lawrence John (1928). The Life of Lord Curzon. Vol. 3. London: Ernest Benn. OCLC 779215669.
