= William Mellish =

William Mellish is the name of:

- William Mellish (died 1791) (c. 1710–1791), British government administrator and Member of Parliament
- William Mellish (victualler) (c. 1763–1834), English businessman
- William Mellish (banker) (c. 1764–1838), English politician, banker and Governor of the Bank of England, son of the above
- William Mellish (cricketer) (1810–1864)
