= Baron Clarina =

Baron Clarina, of Elm in the County of Limerick, was a title in the Peerage of Ireland. It was created on 27 December 1800 for General Eyre Massey. The third Baron sat in the House of Lords as a Scottish representative peer between 1849 and 1872. The fourth Baron was an Irish representative peer between 1888 and 1897. The barony became extinct on the death of the sixth Baron on 4 November 1952.

Hugh Massy, 1st Baron Massy, was the elder brother of the first Baron Clarina.

== Barons Clarina (1800) ==
- Eyre Massey, 1st Baron Clarina (1719–1804)
- Nathaniel William Massey, 2nd Baron Clarina (1773–1810)
- Eyre Massey, 3rd Baron Clarina (1798–1872)
- Eyre Challoner Henry Massey, 4th Baron Clarina (1830–1897)
- Lionel Edward Massey, 5th Baron Clarina (1837–1922)
- Eyre Nathaniel Massey, 6th Baron Clarina (1880–1952)

== Arms ==
Coat of arms of Baron Clarina

Crest
Out of a ducal coronet Or a bull's head Gules armed Sable.
Escutcheon
Argent on a chevron between three fusils Sable a lion passant Or.
Supporters
Two grenadier soldiers in the uniform of the 27th Foot Proper each holding in his exterior hand a sword also Proper.
Motto
Pro Libertate Patriae

== See also ==
- Baron Massy
- Massey Baronets
