= 1943 King's Lynn by-election =

UK by-election

The King's Lynn by-election, 1943 was a by-election held for the British House of Commons constituency of King's Lynn in Norfolk on 12 February 1943. The seat had become vacant when the Conservative Member of Parliament (MP) Somerset Maxwell had died in December 1942 from wounds received at the Battle of El Alamein.

== Candidates ==
The Conservative candidate was Maurice Roche, who had been the MP for King's Lynn from 1924 until he stepped down in favour of Maxwell at the 1935 general election. Although a hereditary peer, his succession in 1920 to the title of Baron Fermoy had not disqualified him from the House of Commons, because his title was in the Peerage of Ireland, and did not grant a seat in the House of Lords.

During World War II, the parties in the Coalition Government had agreed not to contest by-elections in seats held by other coalition parties, and many wartime by-elections were therefore unopposed. However, local party members who disagreed with the truce could not be prevented from standing as independent candidates. In King's Lynn, Frederick Wise, who had been the official Labour Party candidate at the 1935 general election, stood as an "Independent Labour" candidate.

== Result ==
On a heavily reduced turnout, Lord Fermoy held the seat for the Conservatives, albeit with a much reduced majority. Fermoy retired (for a second time) at the 1945 general election, when Wise won the seat as an official Labour Party candidate.

King's Lynn by-election, 1943
Party	Candidate	Votes	%	±%
Conservative	Maurice Roche	10,696	54.2	+4.2
Independent Labour	Frederick Wise	9,027	45.8	New
Majority		1,669	8.4	−7.1
Turnout		9,723	39.8	−31.9
Conservative hold		Swing		

== See also ==
- King's Lynn (UK Parliament constituency)
- King's Lynn
- List of United Kingdom by-elections (1931 - 1950)
