= Representative peer =

Peers in the British House of Lords

In the United Kingdom, representative peers were those peers elected by the members of the Peerage of Scotland and the Peerage of Ireland to sit in the British House of Lords. Until 1999, all members of the Peerage of England held the right to sit in the House of Lords; they did not elect a limited group of representatives. All peers who were created after 1707 as Peers of Great Britain and after 1801 as Peers of the United Kingdom held the same right to sit in the House of Lords.

Representative peers were introduced in 1707, when the Kingdom of England and the Kingdom of Scotland were united into the Kingdom of Great Britain. At the time there were 168 English and 154 Scottish peers. The English peers feared that the House of Lords would be swamped by the Scottish element, and consequently the election of a small number of representative peers to represent Scotland was negotiated. A similar arrangement was adopted when the Kingdom of Great Britain and the Kingdom of Ireland merged into the United Kingdom of Great Britain and Ireland in January 1801.

Scotland was allowed to elect sixteen representative peers, while Ireland could elect twenty-eight. Those chosen by Scotland sat for the life of one Parliament, and following each dissolution new Scottish peers were elected. In contrast, Irish representative peers sat for life. Elections for Irish peers ceased when the Irish Free State came into existence as a dominion in December 1922. However, already-elected Irish peers continued to be entitled to sit until their death. Elections for Scottish peers ended in 1963, when all Scottish peers obtained the right to sit in the House of Lords.

Under the House of Lords Act 1999, a new form of representative peer was introduced to allow some hereditary peers to stay in the House of Lords.

== Scotland ==
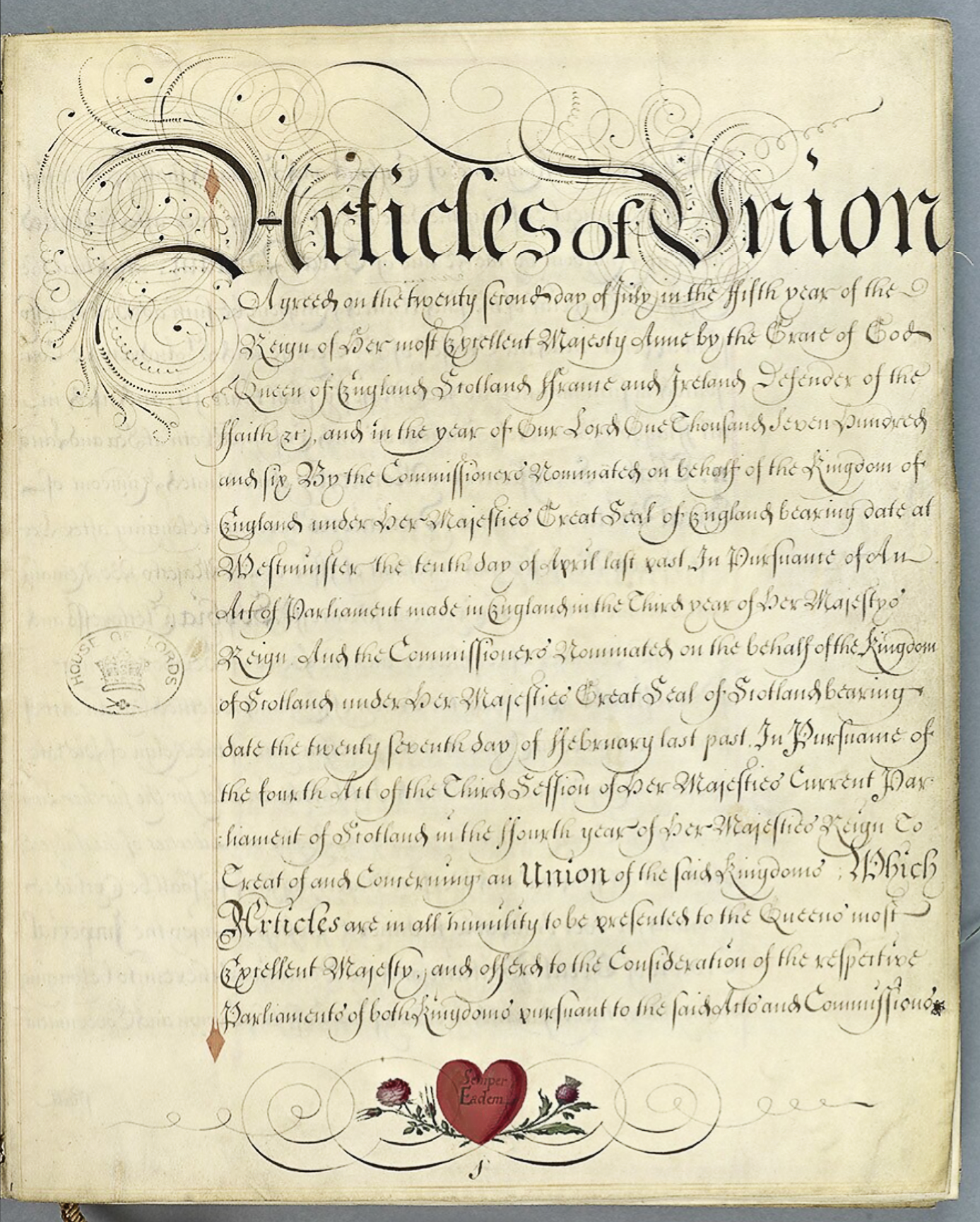
The Act of Union 1707 was ratified in Scotland on 16 January 1707, and by the English Parliament on 19 March 1707

Under articles XXII and XXIII of the Act of Union 1707, Scottish peers were entitled to elect sixteen representative peers to the House of Lords. Each served for one Parliament or a maximum of seven years, but could be re-elected during future Parliaments. Upon the summons of a new Parliament, the Sovereign would issue a proclamation summoning Scottish peers to the Palace of Holyroodhouse. The elections were held in the Great Gallery, a large room decorated by eighty-nine of Jacob de Wet's portraits of Scottish monarchs, from Fergus I to Charles II. The Lord Clerk Register would read out the Peerage Roll as indicates his presence when called. The Roll was then re–read, with each peer responding by publicly announcing his votes and the return being sent to the clerk of the crown at London. The same procedure was used whenever a vacancy arose.

The block voting system was used, with each peer casting as many votes as there were seats to be filled. The system permitted the party with the greatest number of peers, normally the Conservatives, to procure a disproportionate number of seats, with opposing parties sometimes being left entirely unrepresented. The Lord Clerk Register was responsible for tallying the votes. The return issued by the Lord Clerk Register was sufficient evidence to admit the representative peers to Parliament; unlike other peers, Scottish representatives did not receive writs of summons. The position and rights of Scottish peers in relation to the House of Lords remained unclear during most of the eighteenth century. In 1711, the 4th Duke of Hamilton, a peer of Scotland, was made Duke of Brandon in the Peerage of Great Britain. When he sought to sit in the House of Lords, he was denied admittance, the Lords ruling that a peer of Scotland could not sit in the House of Lords unless he was a representative peer, even if he also held a British peerage dignity. They reasoned that the Act of Union 1707 had established the number of Scots peers in the House of Lords at no more and no less than sixteen. In 1782, however, the House of Lords reversed the decision, holding that the Crown could admit anyone it pleases to the House of Lords, whether a Scottish peer or not, subject only to qualifications such as being of full age.

Under the Peerage Act 1963, all Scottish peers procured the right to sit in the House of Lords, and the system of electing representative peers was abolished. Scottish as well as British and English hereditary peers lost their automatic right to sit in the Upper House with the passage of the House of Lords Act 1999. During the debate on the House of Lords Bill, a question arose as to whether the proposal would violate the Treaty of Union. In suggesting that the Bill did indeed violate the Articles of Union, it was submitted that, prior to Union, the Estates of Parliament, Scotland's old, pre-Union parliament, was entitled to impose conditions, and that one fundamental condition was a guarantee of representation of Scotland in both Houses of Parliament at Westminster. It was implied, furthermore, that the Peerage Act 1963 did not violate the requirement of Scottish representation, set out in the Article XXII of the Treaty of Union, by allowing all Scottish peers to sit in the House of Lords: as long as a minimum of sixteen seats were reserved for Scotland, the principles of the Article would be upheld. It was further argued that the only way to rescind the requirement of Article XXII would be to dissolve the Union between England and Scotland, which the House of Lords Bill did not seek to do.

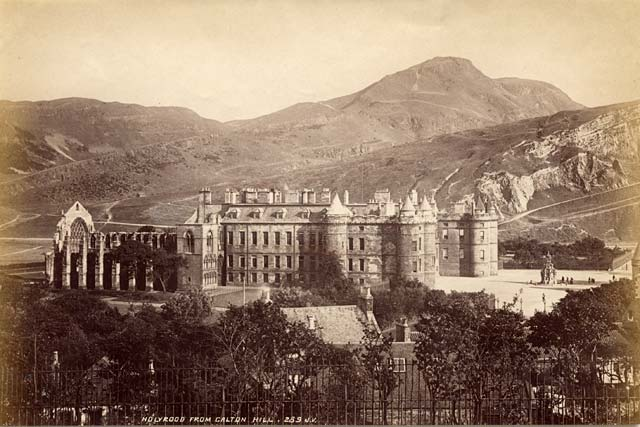
Scottish representative peers were chosen in the Palace of Holyroodhouse

Counsel for the Government held a different view. It was noted that the Peerage Act 1963 explicitly repealed the portions of the Articles of Union relating to elections of representative peers, and that no parliamentary commentators had raised doubts as to the validity of those repeals. As Article XXII had been, at least purportedly, repealed, there was nothing specific in the Treaty that the bill transgressed. It was further asserted by the Government that Article XXII could be repealed because it had not been entrenched. Examples of entrenched provisions are numerous: England and Scotland were united "forever", the Court of Session was to remain "in all time coming within Scotland as it is now constituted", and the establishment of the Church of Scotland was "effectually and unalterably secured". Article XXII, however, did not include any words of entrenchment that would have made it "fundamental or unalterable in all time coming".

Further, the Government pointed out that, even if the election of Scottish peers were entrenched, Parliament could amend the provision under the doctrine of Parliamentary sovereignty. Though the position of the Church of Scotland was "unalterably" secured, the Universities (Scotland) Act 1853 repealed the requirement that professors declare their faith before assuming a position. In Ireland, the Church of Ireland was entirely disestablished in 1869, though the Articles of Union with Ireland had clearly entrenched the establishment of that body. In December 1922, the Union with most of Ireland was dissolved upon the creation of the Irish Free State, though Great Britain and all of Ireland were supposedly united "forever." It was therefore suggested that Parliament could, if it pleased, repeal an Article of Union as well amend as any underlying principle.

The Privileges Committee unanimously found that the Articles of Union would not be breached by the House of Lords Bill if it were enacted. The bill did receive Royal Assent, and from 1999, hereditary peers have not had the automatic right to sit in Parliament.

== Ireland ==
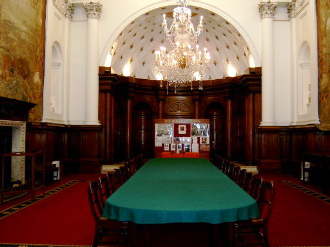
The Chamber of the Irish House of Lords in Parliament House on College Green in Dublin was the location of the first election of Irish representative peers.

Irish representation in the Westminster parliament was outlined by articles IV and VIII of the agreement embodied in the Acts of Union 1800, which also required the Irish Parliament to pass an act before the union providing details for implementation.

Irish peers were allowed to elect twenty-eight representative peers as Lords Temporal, each of whom could serve for life. The Chamber of the Irish House of Lords, located in Parliament House on College Green in central Dublin, housed the first election, attended by the peers or their proxies. The government mistakenly circulated a list of the successful candidates before the vote. The Clerk of the Crown and Hanaper in Ireland was responsible for electoral arrangements; each peer voted by an open and public ballot. After the Union, new elections were held by postal vote within 52 days of a vacancy. Vacancies arose through death or, in the case of Baron Ashtown in 1915, bankruptcy. No vacancy was created where a representative peer acquired a UK peerage, as when Lord Curzon was made Earl Curzon of Kedleston in 1911.

The Lord Chancellor of Great Britain—the presiding officer of the House of Lords—certified the vacancy, while the Lord Chancellor of Ireland directed the Clerk of the Crown and Hanaper to issue ballots to Irish peers, receive the completed ballots, determine the victor, and announce the result, which was then published in both The Dublin Gazette and The London Gazette. Roman Catholic peers could not vote or stand for election until the Roman Catholic Relief Act 1829. The process of being recognised by the Westminster Committee of Privileges as an elector was more cumbersome and expensive than being recognised as a (British or Irish) peer, until the orders drawn up in 1800 were amended in 1857. Successive governments tried to prevent the election of absentee landlords. An exception was Lord Curzon, who won election as a representative peer in 1908, despite never having claimed the right to be an elector; he had been refused a peerage of the United Kingdom by the Liberal government of the day.

The Acts of Union united the Church of England and Church of Ireland, whose bishops and archbishops had previously sat as Lords Spiritual in their respective Houses of Lords. In the united Parliament, there were at first four Irish prelates at any one time, one archbishop and three diocesan bishops, who sat for a session before ceding their seats to colleagues on a fixed rotation of dioceses. The rotation passed over any bishop already serving as an elected representative peer, as when Charles Agar sat as Viscount Somerton rather than as Archbishop of Dublin. The rotation was changed by the Church Temporalities Act 1833 (3 & 4 Will. 4. c. 37), which merged many dioceses and degraded the archbishoprics of Tuam and Cashel to bishoprics. No Irish bishops sat in Westminster as Lords Spiritual after the disestablishment of the Church of Ireland in 1871, brought about by the Irish Church Act 1869, although Robin Eames was made a life peer in 1995 while Archbishop of Armagh.

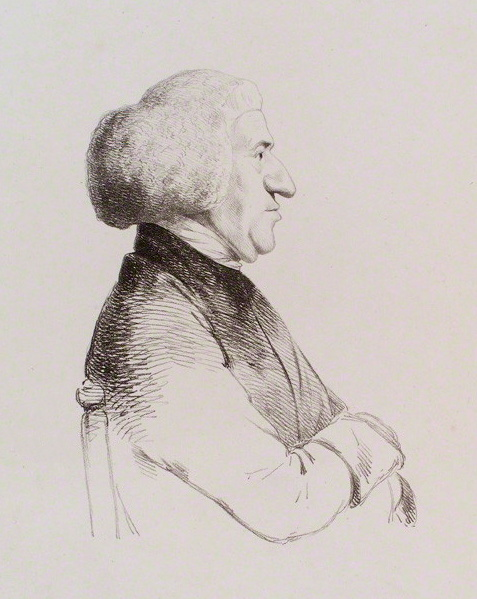
The Most Rev. the Earl of Normanton, Lord Archbishop of Dublin, one of the first 28 Irish representative peers

=== Abolition and attempts to reintroduce ===
Following the establishment of the Irish Free State in December 1922, Irish peers ceased to elect representatives, although those already elected continued to have the right to serve for life; the last of the temporal peers, Francis Needham, 4th Earl of Kilmorey, by chance a peer from an Ulster family, died in 1961. Disputes had arisen long before as to whether Irish representative peers could still be elected. The main Irish Free State Constitution Act 1922 was silent on the matter, to some seeming to mean that the right had not been abolished, but the ancillary Irish Free State (Consequential Provisions) Act 1922 had abolished the office of Lord Chancellor of Ireland, whose involvement was required in the election process. The Irish Free State abolished the office of Clerk of the Crown and Hanaper in 1926, the last holder becoming Master of the High Court. After 1922 various Irish peers petitioned the House of Lords for a restoration of their right to elect representatives. In 1962, the Joint Committee on House of Lords Reform again rejected such requests. In the next year, when the Peerage Act 1963 (which, among other things, gave all peers in the Peerage of Scotland the right to sit in the House of Lords) was being considered, an amendment similarly to allow Irish peers all to be summoned was defeated, by ninety votes to eight. Instead, the new Act confirmed the right of all Irish peers to stand for election to the House of Commons in any UK constituency and to vote at parliamentary elections: prior to the Act they were only allowed to stand for election in Great Britain.

In 1965, the 8th Earl of Antrim, another peer from Ulster, and other Irish peers, petitioned the House of Lords, arguing that the right to elect representative peers had never been formally abolished. The House of Lords ruled against them. Lord Reid, a Lord of Appeal in Ordinary, based his ruling on the Act of Union, which stated that representative peers sat "on the part of Ireland." He reasoned that, since the island had been divided into the Irish Free State and Northern Ireland, there was no such political entity called "Ireland" which the representative peers could be said to represent. Lord Reid wrote, "A statutory provision is impliedly repealed if a later enactment brings to an end a state of things the continuance of which is essential for its operation." In contrast, Lord Wilberforce, another Lord of Appeal in Ordinary, disagreed that a major enactment such as the Act of Union could be repealed by implication. He argued instead that since the posts of Lord Chancellor of Ireland and Clerk of the Crown and Hanaper had been abolished, there was no mechanism by which Irish peers could be elected. Here too, the petitioners lost.

The petitioners failed to raise the status of Northern Ireland as part of the United Kingdom. Charles Lysaght suggests that if this fact had been foremost, Lord Wilberforce's arguments relating to the removal of the electoral mechanism for the election could be rebutted, as the Lord Chancellor of Ireland and the Clerk of the Crown and Hanaper did have successors in Northern Ireland. The reason for excluding the arguments relating to Northern Ireland from the petition "was that leading counsel for the petitioning Irish peers was convinced that the members of the Committee for Privileges were with him on what he considered was his best argument and did not want to alienate them by introducing another point." To prevent further appeals on the matter, Parliament repealed, as a part of the Statute Law (Repeals) Act 1971, the sections of the Acts of Union relating to the election of Irish representative peers.

== House of Commons ==
After the Union of England and Scotland in 1707, Scottish peers, including those who did not sit as representative peers, were excluded from the House of Commons. Irish peers were not subject to the same restrictions. Irish members not nominated as representative peers were allowed to serve in Parliament as representatives of constituencies in Great Britain, although not in Ireland, provided they gave up their privileges as a peer. Lord Curzon, for example, specifically requested an Irish peerage when made Viceroy of India, so that he would not be debarred from sitting in the House of Commons on his return.

The Peerage Act 1963 allowed all Scottish peers to sit in the House of Lords; it also permitted all Irish peers to sit in the House of Commons for any constituency in the United Kingdom, as well as to vote in parliamentary elections, without being deprived of the remaining privileges of peerage.

== Hereditary "representative peers" ==
During the passage of the House of Lords Bill in 1999, controversy surrounding House of Lords reform remained, and the Bill was conceived as a first stage of Lords reform. The "Weatherill" amendment—so called since it was proposed by former House of Commons Speaker Bernard Weatherill—provided for a number of hereditary peers to remain as members of the House of Lords, during the first stage of Lords reform. It could then be reviewed during the next stage of the reform, when the system of appointed life peerages came under examination. In exchange for the House not delaying the passage of the Bill into law, the Government agreed to this amendment, and it then became part of the House of Lords Act 1999, and 92 hereditary peers were allowed to remain.

The ninety-two peers were made up of three separate groups. Fifteen 'office-holders' comprised deputy speakers and deputy chairmen, and were elected by the house, while seventy-five party and Crossbench members were elected by their own party or group. In addition, there were two royal appointments: the Lord Great Chamberlain, currently Lord Carrington, was appointed as the King's representative in Parliament, while the post of Earl Marshal remains purely hereditary; the office has been held since 1672 by the Dukes of Norfolk and is responsible for ceremonies such as the State Opening of Parliament.

Following the passage of the House of Lords (Hereditary Peers) Act 2026 all seats for Hereditary peers were abolished.

== Sources ==
- Committee For Privileges (5 July 1966). Report on the Petition of the Irish Peers, together with the Cases of the Petitioners, Proceedings of the Committee, and the Minutes of Evidence. Sessional papers. Vol. HL 1966–67 VIII (53) 896. London: Her Majesty's Stationery Office.
- Farnborough, Thomas. Erskine. May, 1st Baron. (1863) Constitutional History of England since the Accession of George the Third. Volume 1 Boston: Crosby and Nichols.
- Lysaght, Charles (1999). "The Irish Peers and the House of Lords". 106th Edition. Burke's Peerage & Baronetage. Archived from the original on 16 July 2011.
- Malcomson, A.P.W. (December 2000). "The Irish Peerage and the Act of Union, 1800–1971". Transactions of the Royal Historical Society. 10, 6th series. Cambridge University Press: 289–327. doi:10.1017/S0080440100000141. ISBN 9780521793520. JSTOR 3679383. S2CID 143607711.
- Documents on Irish Foreign Policy Series: Anglo-Irish Treaty: Text of. Anglo-Irish Treaty, 6 December 1921. The National Archives of Ireland. Retrieved 2007-04-07
- Briefing Paper: Membership of House of Lords (pdf). House of Lords, 2009. Retrieved 2013-01-31
- Peerage (1911). Encyclopædia Britannica, 11th ed. London: Cambridge University Press.
- Privileges – First Report. House of Lords, 18 October 1999. Retrieved 2007-04-07
