= Barry Maxwell, 12th Baron Farnham =

British peer and baron

The Right Honourable The Baron Farnham

Pro Grand Master of the United Grand Lodge of England
- In office 1991–2001
- Preceded by: The Lord Cornwallis
- Succeeded by: The Marquess of Northampton

Personal details
- Born: Barry Owen Somerset Maxwell; 7 July 1931
- Died: 22 March 2001 (aged 69)
- Occupation: Businessman, peer

Barry Owen Somerset Maxwell, 12th Baron Farnham (7 July 1931 – 22 March 2001), was a British peer and baronet.

== Biography ==
Barry Owen Somerset Maxwell was the son of The Honourable Somerset Arthur Maxwell and grandson of Arthur Maxwell, 11th Baron Farnham. He was educated at Eton and Harvard Business School. On his grandfather's death in 1957, he succeeded as the 12th Baron Farnham (and 15th of his family Baronetcy).

Maxwell was called up to the British Army to undertake national service, and was commissioned as a second lieutenant in the Royal Horse Guards on 12 August 1950. Having completed his full-time service, he transferred to the reserve on 1 March 1952. He was made an acting lieutenant on 26 April 1952, and promoted to substantive lieutenant on 7 July 1954 within the Army Emergency Reserve.

Maxwell was a merchant banker and worked at Brown Shipley as a director from 1959 until 1991; he also served as its chairman from 1984 to 1991 and chief executive in 1991. Brown Shipley was acquired by KBL in 1992.

He was a high ranking freemason, having originally joined a Grand Lodge of Ireland lodge in County Cavan. He held office in the United Grand Lodge of England (UGLE) as Senior Grand Warden from 1977 to 1978, Assistant Grand Master from 1982 to 1989, and Deputy Grand Master from 1989 to 1991. He then became the most senior non-royal in UGLE, as Pro Grand Master from 1991 to 2001; as such, he was acting Grand Master when Prince Edward, Duke of Kent was unavailable.

Lord Farnham was due to retire on or about his 70th birthday, but he died on 22 March 2001, a few months before. He was succeeded in the barony by his brother, Simon Kenlis Maxwell, who lived in England.

His wife, Diana, was a Lady of the Bedchamber (1987–2021) to Queen Elizabeth II. Lady Farnham rode alongside the Queen on the way to the Diamond Jubilee service on 5 June 2012 in the absence (through illness) of the Duke of Edinburgh. His sister Sheelin, Viscountess Knollys, served as Chair of South Norfolk District Council and as High Sheriff of Norfolk.

What is now the Farnham Estate Hotel was the on-site replacement to the family seat and its main structure was commissioned around 1780 by the 1st Earl of Farnham and designed by James Wyatt. Its conversion was enabled when Lady Farnham sold it to a local entrepreneur.

Peerage of Ireland
Preceded by Arthur Kenlis Maxwell	Baron Farnham; 1957–2001	Succeeded by Simon Kenlis Maxwell
