= Richard Butler, 1st Earl of Glengall =

Irish peer

Richard Butler

Representative peer for Ireland
- In office 1800–1819

Personal details
- Born: 13 November 1775
- Died: 30 January 1819 (aged 43)
- Party: Tory
- Spouse: Emily Jefferyes (m. 1793)
- Children: 4, including Richard
- Parent: James Butler (father)

The Rt Hon. Richard Butler, 1st Earl of Glengall (13 November 1775 – 30 January 1819), known as The 10th Baron Cahir before 1816, was an Irish peer.

== Biography ==
He was the son and heir of James Butler, 9th Baron Cahir, and Sarah Nicholls. In July 1788, he succeeded to his father's title and assumed his seat in the Irish House of Lords. Following the implementation of the Acts of Union in January 1801, Lord Cahir, as he then was styled, was elected as one of the original 28 Irish representative peers, and took his seat on the Tory benches in the British House of Lords. On 22 January 1816, he was created Viscount Cahir and Earl of Glengall, both titles in the Peerage of Ireland.

== Marriage and issue ==
On 15 August 1793, the then Lord Cahir married Emily Jefferyes, daughter of James St. John Jefferyes and Arabella FitzGibbon, sister of The 1st Earl of Clare. They had four children:

- The Hon. Richard Butler (17 May 1794 – 22 June 1858), styled as Viscount Cahir between January 1816 and January 1819.
- Lady Harriet Anne Butler (1 January 1799 – 14 September 1860), married The 3rd Marquess of Donegall
- Lady Charlotte Butler Talbot (9 May 1809 – 22 March 1846), married Christopher Rice Mansel Talbot, M.P.
- Lady Emily Georgina Arabella (1812 –), married firstly Richard Pennefather (died 1849); secondly, General Henry Aitchison Hankey

Lord Glengall was succeeded by his only son, Richard, Viscount Cahir.

Parliament of the United Kingdom
| New post | Representative peer for Ireland; 1800–1819 | Succeeded by The Earl Belmore |
Peerage of Ireland
| New creation | Earl of Glengall; 1816–1819 | Succeeded by Richard Butler |
| Preceded by James Butler | Baron Cahir; 1788–1819 | Succeeded by Richard Butler |
