= Eyre Massey, 3rd Baron Clarina =

Anglo-Irish peer

Eyre Massey, 3rd Baron Clarina (6 May 1798 – 18 November 1872) was an Anglo-Irish peer.

He was the son of Nathaniel Massey, 2nd Baron Clarina and Penelope Westropp, and he succeeded to his father's title as Baron Clarina in January 1810. Clarina was educated at Christ Church, Oxford and graduated on 20 February 1819. In 1849, Clarina was elected as an Irish representative peer and took his seat in the House of Lords as a Conservative. Clarina was the builder of Elm Park near Limerick; the house was demolished in 1965.

He married Susan Elizabeth Barton, daughter of Hugh Barton and Anne Johnston, on 9 September 1828, and they had eight children. Clarina was succeeded by his eldest surviving son, Eyre. His fifth son was William Massey-Mainwaring.

Political offices
Preceded by The Lord Dunsany	Representative peer for Ireland; 1849–1872	Succeeded by The Lord Crofton
Peerage of Ireland
Preceded by Nathaniel Massey	Baron Clarina; 1810–1872	Succeeded by Eyre Massey
