= List of Irish representative peers =

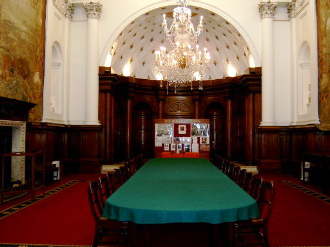
The Chamber of the Irish House of Lords was the location of the first election of Irish representative peers.

This is a list of representative peers elected from the Peerage of Ireland to sit in the British House of Lords after the Kingdom of Ireland was brought into union with the Kingdom of Great Britain. No new members were added to the House after 1919, due to the creation of the Irish Free State, however, the already sitting members continued to remain part of the House, with the last member dying in 1961.

Once elected, peers held their seats for life. (Note: Lord Ashtown's bankruptcy was reported on 28 October 1915, thereby disqualifying him from the House of Lords. He was therefore replaced before his death.) Some of these peers were granted a title in the Peerage of the United Kingdom which gave them a hereditary seat in the House of Lords. These peers also remained as representative peers and were not replaced until their deaths.

== List of Irish representative peers ==
=== 1800–1850 ===
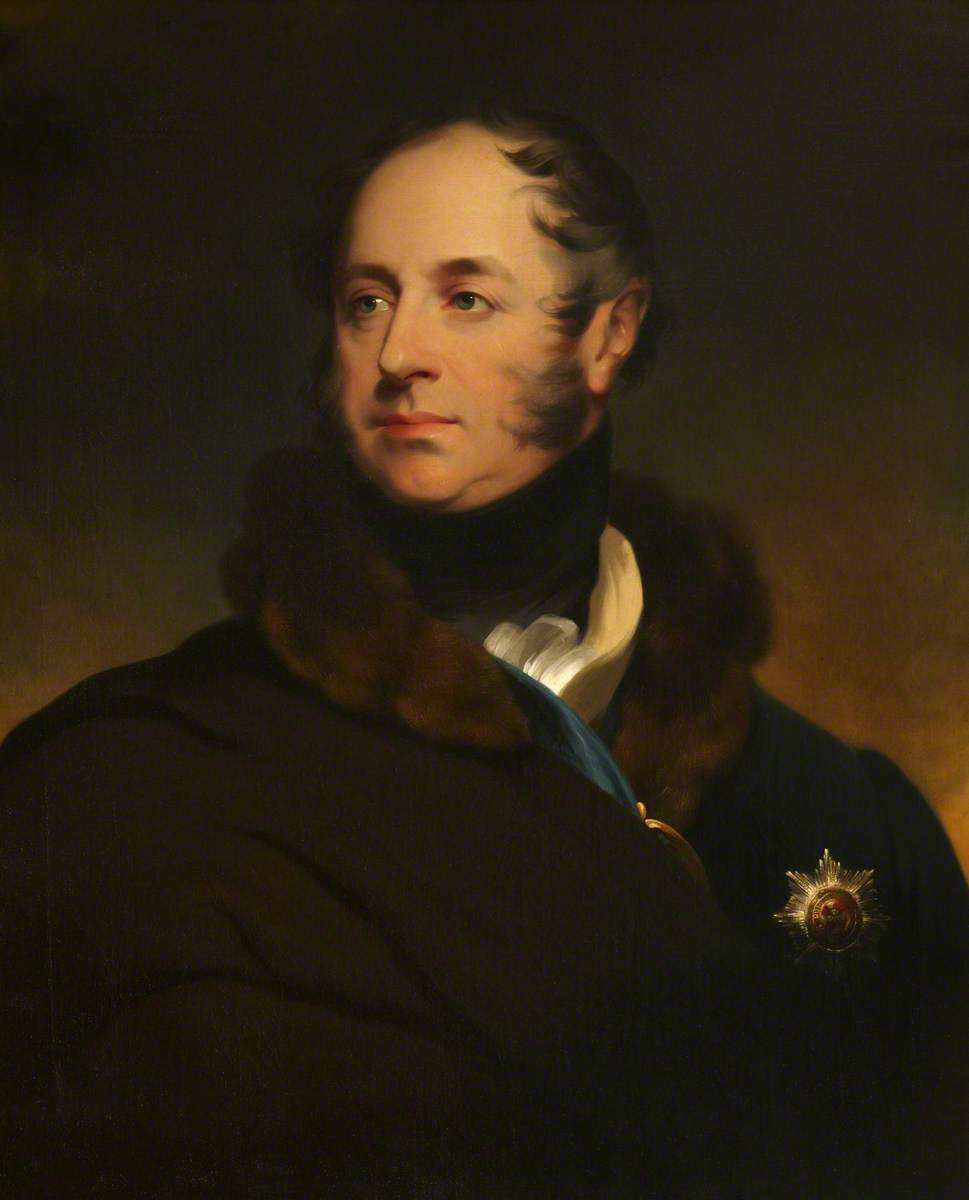
The 2nd Earl of Enniskillen, an Irish representative peer between 1804 and 1840.

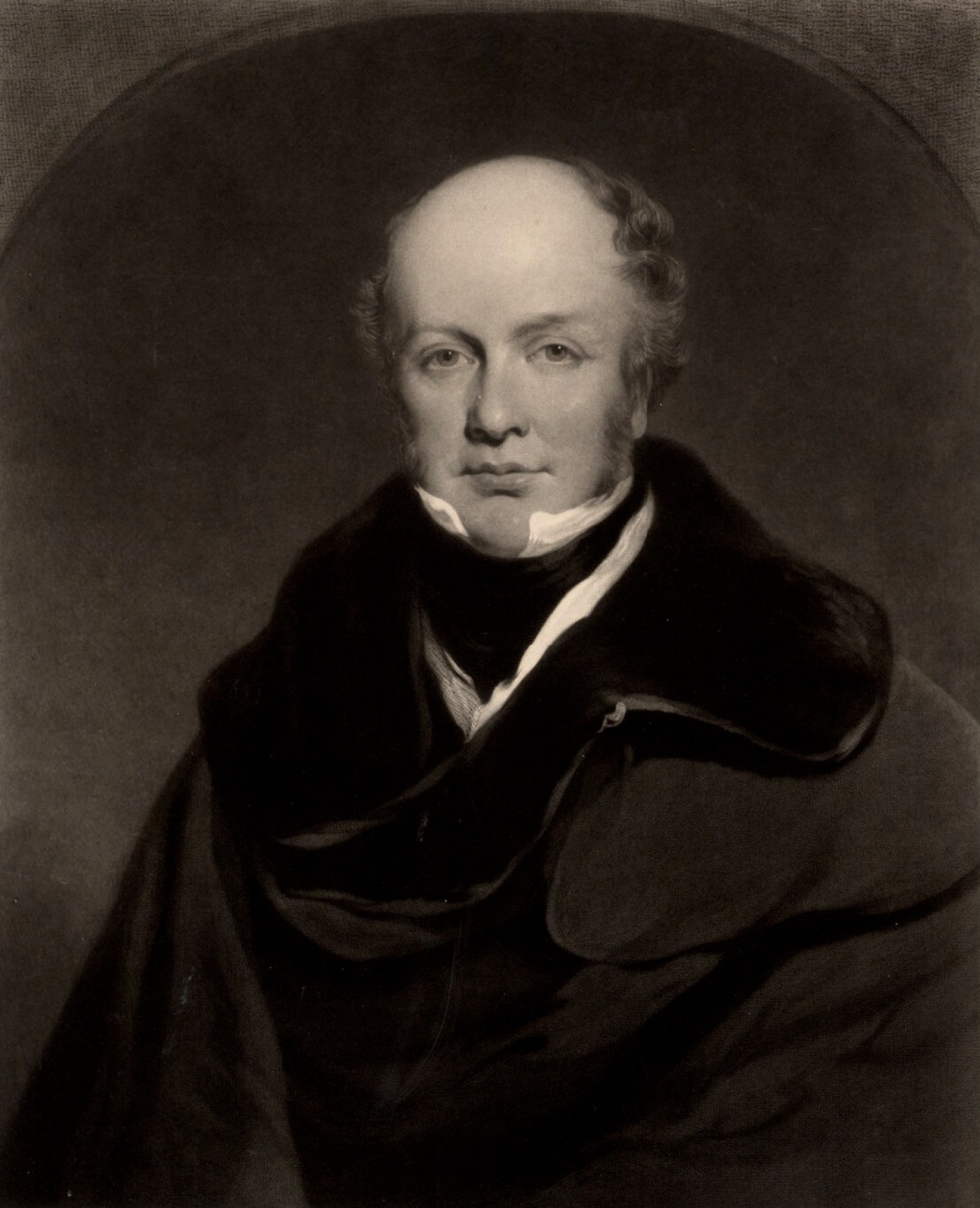
The 2nd Earl of Caledon, an Irish representative peer between 1804 and 1839.

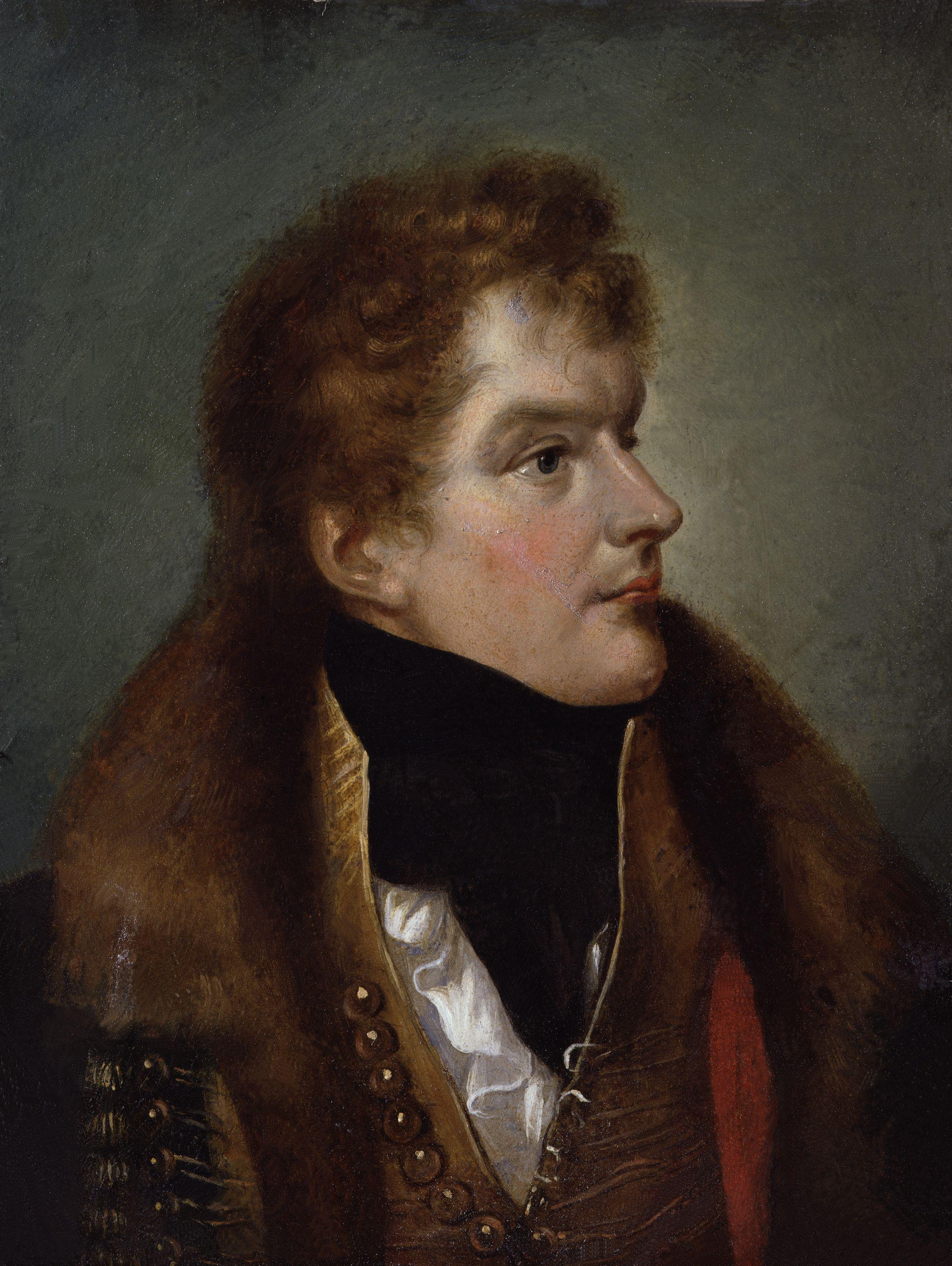
The 1st Earl of Blessington, an Irish representative peer between 1809 and 1829.

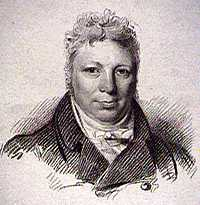
The 2nd Earl of Rosse, an Irish representative peer between 1809 and 1841.

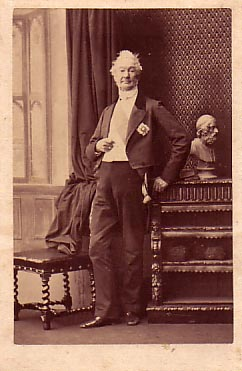
The 2nd Lord Downes, an Irish representative peer between 1833 and 1863.

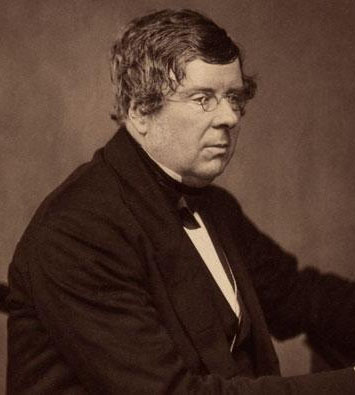
The 3rd Earl of Rosse, an Irish representative peer between 1845 and 1863.

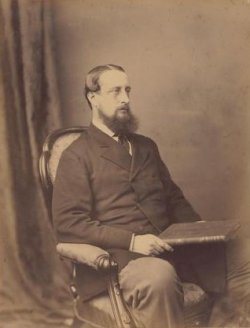
The 4th Earl Belmore, an Irish representative peer between 1857 and 1913.

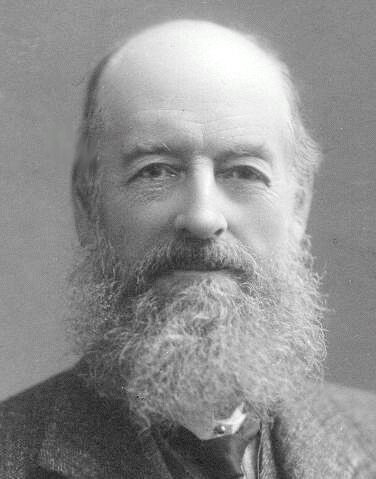
The 4th Earl of Rosse, an Irish representative peer between 1868 and 1908.

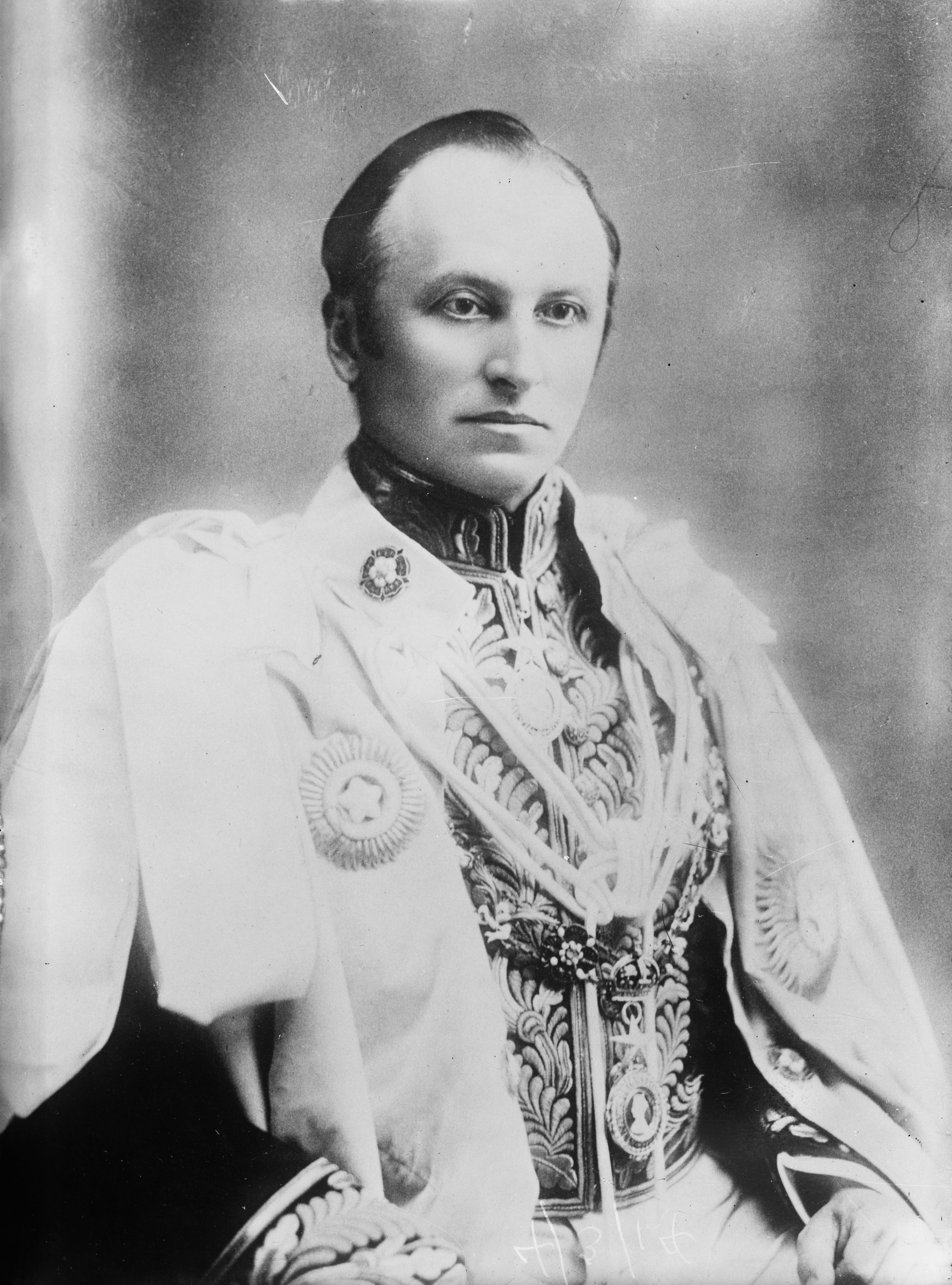
The 1st Lord Curzon of Kedleston, an Irish representative peer between 1908 and 1925.

Representative peer	Elected	Replacing	Died
Robert Cuninghame, 1st Baron Rossmore	2 August 1800		5 August 1801
Robert Clements, 1st Earl of Leitrim	2 August 1800		27 July 1804
Otway Cuffe, 1st Earl of Desart	2 August 1800		9 August 1804
Francis Mathew, 1st Earl Landaff	2 August 1800		30 July 1806
Lawrence Parsons, 1st Earl of Rosse	2 August 1800		20 April 1807
John de Burgh, 13th Earl of Clanricarde	2 August 1800		27 July 1808
John Browne, 1st Marquess of Sligo	2 August 1800		2 January 1809
Charles Agar, 1st Earl of Normanton	2 August 1800		14 July 1809
Richard Longfield, 1st Baron Longueville	2 August 1800		23 May 1811
George Nugent, 7th Earl of Westmeath	2 August 1800		30 December 1814
John Crosbie, 2nd Earl of Glandore	2 August 1800		23 October 1815
Robert Howard, 2nd Earl of Wicklow	2 August 1800		23 October 1815
George Agar, 1st Baron Callan	2 August 1800		29 October 1815
Thomas Knox, 1st Viscount Northland	2 August 1800		5 November 1818
Richard Butler, 1st Earl of Glengall	2 August 1800		30 January 1819
Robert Jocelyn, 2nd Earl of Roden	2 August 1800		29 June 1820
Robert Stewart, 1st Marquess of Londonderry	2 August 1800		6 April 1821
James Cuffe, 1st Baron Tyrawley	2 August 1800		15 June 1821
Richard Hely-Hutchinson, 1st Earl of Donoughmore	2 August 1800		22 August 1825
Hugh Carleton, 1st Viscount Carleton	2 August 1800		25 February 1826
John Creighton, 1st Earl Erne	2 August 1800		15 September 1828
Thomas Taylour, 1st Marquess of Headfort	2 August 1800		24 October 1829
Francis Bernard, 1st Earl of Bandon	2 August 1800		26 November 1830
Henry Conyngham, 1st Marquess Conyngham	2 August 1800		28 December 1832
Thomas Pakenham, 2nd Earl of Longford	2 August 1800		24 May 1835
Richard Bingham, 2nd Earl of Lucan	2 August 1800		30 June 1839
Charles O'Neill, 1st Earl O'Neill	2 August 1800		25 March 1841
Edmund Pery, 1st Earl of Limerick	2 August 1800		7 December 1844
Charles Bury, 1st Earl of Charleville	2 November 1801	Robert Cuninghame, 1st Baron Rossmore	31 October 1835
John Cole, 2nd Earl of Enniskillen	13 October 1804	Robert Clements, 1st Earl of Leitrim	31 March 1840
Du Pré Alexander, 2nd Earl of Caledon	26 November 1804	Otway Cuffe, 1st Earl of Desart	8 April 1839
Francis Caulfeild, 2nd Earl of Charlemont	12 December 1806	Francis Matthew, 1st Earl Landaff	26 December 1863
George King, 3rd Earl of Kingston	11 July 1807	Lawrence Parsons, 1st Earl of Rosse	18 October 1839
Richard Trench, 2nd Earl of Clancarty	16 December 1808	John de Burgh, 13th Earl of Clanricarde	24 November 1837
Charles Gardiner, 1st Earl of Blessington	15 April 1809	John Browne, 1st Marquess of Sligo	25 May 1829
Lawrence Parsons, 2nd Earl of Rosse	22 October 1809	Charles Agar, 1st Earl of Normanton	24 February 1841
Archibald Acheson, 2nd Earl of Gosford	19 August 1811	Richard Longfield, 1st Viscount Longueville	27 March 1849
Stephen Moore, 2nd Earl Mount Cashell	24 March 1815	George Nugent, 7th Earl of Westmeath	27 October 1822
John Maxwell, 2nd Earl of Farnham	2 March 1816	John Crosbie, 2nd Earl of Glandore	23 July 1823
John Bourke, 4th Earl of Mayo	2 March 1816	Robert Howard, 2nd Earl of Wicklow	23 May 1849
William O'Brien, 2nd Marquess of Thomond	2 March 1816	George Agar, 1st Baron Callan	21 August 1846
Somerset Butler, 3rd Earl of Carrick	13 March 1819	Thomas Knox, 1st Viscount Northland	4 February 1838
Somerset Lowry-Corry, 2nd Earl Belmore	5 May 1819	Richard Butler, 1st Earl of Glengall	18 April 1841
James Blackwood, 2nd Baron Dufferin and Claneboye	7 October 1820	Robert Jocelyn, 2nd Earl of Roden	8 August 1836
Richard Wingfield, 5th Viscount Powerscourt	3 August 1821	Robert Stewart, 1st Marquess of Londonderry	9 August 1823
William Howard, 4th Earl of Wicklow	10 November 1821	Charles O'Hara, 1st Baron Tyrawley	22 March 1869
Robert King, 1st Viscount Lorton	8 February 1823	Stephen Moore, 2nd Earl Mount Cashell	20 November 1854
John Evans-Freke, 6th Baron Carbery	30 January 1824	John Maxwell, 2nd Earl of Farnham	12 May 1845
Charles Vereker, 2nd Viscount Gort	30 January 1824	Richard Wingfield, 5th Viscount Powerscourt	11 November 1842
John Maxwell-Barry, 5th Baron Farnham	17 December 1825	Richard Hely-Hutchinson, 1st Earl of Donoughmore	20 September 1838
Stephen Moore, 3rd Earl Mount Cashell	1 July 1826	Hugh Carleton, 1st Viscount Carleton	10 October 1883
Henry Prittie, 2nd Baron Dunalley	19 December 1828	John Creighton, 1st Earl Erne	19 October 1854
Richard Butler, 2nd Earl of Glengall	1 September 1829	Charles John Gardiner, 1st Earl of Blessington	22 June 1858
Hayes St Leger, 3rd Viscount Doneraile	15 March 1830	Thomas Taylour, 1st Marquess of Headfort	27 March 1854
George Nugent, 1st Marquess of Westmeath	26 February 1831	Francis Bernard, 1st Earl of Bandon	5 May 1871
Ulysses Burgh, 2nd Baron Downes	30 March 1833	Henry Conyngham, 1st Marquess Conyngham	26 July 1863
James Bernard, 2nd Earl of Bandon	31 July 1835	Thomas Pakenham, 2nd Earl of Longford	31 October 1856
Edward Plunkett, 14th Baron Dunsany	18 January 1836	Charles Bury, 1st Earl of Charleville	11 December 1848
Cornwallis Maude, 3rd Viscount Hawarden	31 October 1836	James Stevenson Blackwood, 2nd Baron Dufferin	12 October 1856
Robert Dillon, 3rd Baron Clonbrock	20 February 1838	Richard Le Poer Trench, 2nd Earl of Clancarty	4 December 1893
Charles Bury, 2nd Earl of Charleville	13 April 1838	Somerset Richard Butler, 3rd Earl of Carrick	14 July 1851
John Vesey, 2nd Viscount de Vesci	19 January 1839	John Maxwell-Barry, 5th Baron Farnham	19 October 1855
Henry Maxwell, 7th Baron Farnham	2 July 1839	Du Pré Alexander, 2nd Earl of Caledon	20 August 1868
Windham Quin, 2nd Earl of Dunraven and Mount-Earl	21 September 1839	Richard Bingham, 2nd Earl of Lucan	6 August 1850
Edward Crofton, 2nd Baron Crofton	21 January 1840	George King, 3rd Earl of Kingston	27 December 1869
George Bingham, 3rd Earl of Lucan	22 June 1840	John Cole, 2nd Earl of Enniskillen	10 November 1888
James Alexander, 3rd Earl of Caledon	8 May 1841	Lawence Parsons, 2nd Earl of Rosse	30 June 1855
Cadwallader Blayney, 12th Baron Blayney	12 June 1841	Charles O'Neill, 1st Earl O'Neill	18 January 1874
Richard Handcock, 3rd Baron Castlemaine	6 July 1841	Somerset Lowry-Corry, 2nd Earl Belmore	4 July 1869
John O'Neill, 3rd Viscount O'Neill	31 January 1843	Charles Vereker, 2nd Viscount Gort	12 February 1855
William Parsons, 3rd Earl of Rosse	24 February 1845	Edmund Henry Percy, 1st Earl of Limerick	31 October 1867
John Crichton, 3rd Earl Erne	24 July 1845	John Evans-Freke, 6th Baron Carbery	3 October 1885
John Cuffe, 3rd Earl of Desart	11 December 1846	William O'Brien, 2nd Marquess of Thomond	1 April 1865
Eyre Massey, 3rd Baron Clarina	16 April 1849	Edward Plunkett, 14th Baron Dunsany	18 November 1872
John Browne, 3rd Baron Kilmaine	22 June 1849	Archibald Acheson, 2nd Earl of Gosford	13 January 1873
George Butler, 5th Earl of Lanesborough	14 August 1849	John Bourke, 4th Earl of Mayo	7 July 1866

=== 1850–1900 ===
Representative peer	Elected	Replacing	Died
Randall Plunkett, 15th Baron Dunsany	19 November 1850	Windham Quin, 2nd Earl of Dunraven and Mount-Earl	7 April 1852
Denis Daly, 2nd Baron Dunsandle and Clanconal	23 September 1851	Charles Bury, 2nd Earl of Charleville	11 January 1893
Robert Bourke, 5th Earl of Mayo	22 June 1852	Randall Edward Plunkett, 15th Baron Dunsany	12 August 1867
Richard White, 2nd Earl of Bantry	1 July 1854	Hayes St Leger, 3rd Viscount Doneraile	16 July 1868
Edward Ward, 4th Viscount Bangor	9 January 1855	Henry Prittie, 2nd Baron Dunalley	14 September 1881
Hayes St Leger, 4th Viscount Doneraile	2 May 1855	Robert King, 1st Viscount Lorton	26 August 1887
Arthur Hill-Trevor, 3rd Viscount Dungannon	11 September 1855	John O'Neill, 3rd Viscount O'Neill	11 August 1862
Henry Dawson-Damer, 3rd Earl of Portarlington	24 October 1855	James Alexander, 3rd Earl of Caledon	1 March 1889
James Hewitt, 4th Viscount Lifford	23 January 1856	John Vesey, 2nd Viscount de Vesci	20 November 1887
Thomas Vesey, 3rd Viscount de Vesci	10 January 1857	Cornwallis Maude, 3rd Viscount Hawarden	23 December 1875
Somerset Lowry-Corry, 4th Earl Belmore	13 January 1857	James Bernard, 2nd Earl of Bandon	6 April 1913
Francis Bernard, 3rd Earl of Bandon	21 August 1858	Richard Butler, 2nd Earl of Glengall	17 February 1877
Cornwallis Maude, 4th Viscount Hawarden	2 December 1862	Mark Trevor, 3rd Viscount Dungannon	9 January 1905
Lucius O'Brien, 13th Baron Inchiquin	20 October 1863	Ulysses Burgh, 2nd Baron Downes	22 March 1872
Edward Plunkett, 16th Baron Dunsany	8 March 1864	Francis Caulfeild, 2nd Earl of Charlemont	22 February 1889
John Vereker, 3rd Viscount Gort	13 June 1865	John Cuffe, 3rd Earl of Desart	20 October 1865
Mervyn Wingfield, 7th Viscount Powerscourt	26 December 1865	John Vereker, 3rd Viscount Gort	5 June 1904
George Upton, 3rd Viscount Templetown	14 September 1866	George Butler, 5th Earl of Lanesborough	4 January 1890
William Annesley, 4th Earl Annesley	15 October 1867	Robert Bourke, 5th Earl of Mayo	10 August 1874
Theobald Butler, 14th Baron Dunboyne	11 January 1868	William Parsons, 3rd Earl of Rosse	22 March 1881
Charles Allanson-Winn, 3rd Baron Headley	28 September 1868	Richard White, 2nd Earl of Bantry	30 July 1877
Lawrence Parsons, 4th Earl of Rosse	22 December 1868	Henry Maxwell, 7th Baron Farnham	29 August 1908
William Hedges-White, 3rd Earl of Bantry	6 July 1869	William Howard, 4th Earl of Wicklow	15 January 1884
Geoffrey Browne-Guthrie, 2nd Baron Oranmore and Browne	6 September 1869	Richard Handcock, 3rd Baron Castlemaine	15 November 1900
John Butler, 6th Earl of Lanesborough	5 April 1870	Edward Crofton, 2nd Baron Crofton	12 September 1905
Dayrolles Eveleigh-de-Moleyns, 4th Baron Ventry	10 July 1871	George Nugent, 1st Marquess of Westmeath	8 February 1914
Charles Howard, 5th Earl of Wicklow	19 June 1872	Lucius O'Brien, 13th Baron Inchiquin	20 June 1881
Edward Crofton, 3rd Baron Crofton	11 February 1873	Eyre Massey, 3rd Baron Clarina	22 September 1912
Edward O'Brien, 14th Baron Inchiquin	5 April 1873	John Browne, 3rd Baron Kilmaine	9 April 1900
Richard Handcock, 4th Baron Castlemaine	9 May 1874	Cadwallader Blayney, 12th Baron Blayney	26 April 1892
John Scott, 4th Earl of Clonmell	10 November 1874	William Annesley, 4th Earl of Annesley	22 June 1891
John Massy, 6th Baron Massy	14 March 1876	Thomas Vesey, 3rd Viscount de Vesci	28 November 1915
Hugh Annesley, 5th Earl of Annesley	28 April 1877	Francis Bernard, 3rd Earl of Bandon	15 December 1908
James Alexander, 4th Earl of Caledon	30 October 1877	Charles Allanson-Winn, 3rd Baron Headley	27 April 1898
James Bernard, 4th Earl of Bandon	6 June 1881	Theobald Butler, 14th Baron Dunboyne	18 May 1924
Edward Leeson, 6th Earl of Milltown	23 August 1881	Charles Howard, 5th Earl of Wicklow	30 May 1890
Francis Needham, 3rd Earl of Kilmorey	31 December 1881	Edward Ward, 4th Viscount Bangor	28 July 1915
Charles Allanson-Winn, 4th Baron Headley	20 December 1883	Stephen Moore, 3rd Earl Mount Cashell	13 January 1913
Hercules Rowley, 4th Baron Langford	14 March 1884	William Hedges-White, 3rd Earl of Bantry	29 October 1919
Henry Ward, 5th Viscount Bangor	12 January 1886	John Crichton, 3rd Earl Erne	23 February 1911
Henry King-Tenison, 8th Earl of Kingston	24 October 1887	Hayes St Leger, 4th Viscount Doneraile	13 January 1896
Cecil Howard, 6th Earl of Wicklow	23 January 1888	James Hewitt, 4th Viscount Lifford	24 July 1891
Eyre Massey, 4th Baron Clarina	31 December 1888	George Bingham, 3rd Earl of Lucan	16 December 1897
Thomas McClintock-Bunbury, 2nd Baron Rathdonnell	8 April 1889	Edward Plunkett, 16th Baron Dunsany	22 May 1929
Charles Bingham, 4th Earl of Lucan	19 April 1889	Henry Dawson-Damer, 3rd Earl of Portarlington	5 June 1914
Francis Browne, 4th Baron Kilmaine	21 February 1890	George Upton, 3rd Viscount Templetown	9 November 1907
Dermot Bourke, 7th Earl of Mayo	14 July 1890	Edward Leeson, 6th Earl of Milltown	31 December 1927
William Evans-Freke, 8th Baron Carbery	3 August 1891	John Scott, 4th Earl of Clonmell	7 November 1894
Henry Prittie, 4th Baron Dunalley	9 October 1891	Cecil Howard, 6th Earl of Wicklow	5 August 1927
Hamilton Deane-Morgan, 4th Baron Muskerry	13 June 1892	Richard Handcock, 4th Baron Castlemaine	9 June 1929
John Plunkett, 17th Baron Dunsany	6 March 1893	Denis Daly, 2nd Baron Dunsandle and Clanconal	16 January 1899
Henry Upton, 4th Viscount Templetown	29 January 1894	Robert Dillon, 3rd Baron Clonbrock	30 September 1939
Luke Dillon, 4th Baron Clonbrock	21 January 1895	William Evans-Freke, 8th Baron Carbery	12 May 1917
George Dawson-Damer, 5th Earl of Portarlington	20 March 1896	Henry King-Tenison, 8th Earl of Kingston	31 August 1900
Albert Handcock, 5th Baron Castlemaine	7 March 1898	Eyre Massey, 4th Baron Clarina	6 July 1937
Somerset Maxwell, 10th Baron Farnham	22 July 1898	James Alexander, 4th Earl of Caledon	22 November 1900
Ponsonby Moore, 9th Earl of Drogheda	31 March 1899	John Plunkett, 17th Baron Dunsany	28 October 1908

=== 1900–1919 ===
Representative peer	Elected	Replacing	Died
Reymond de Montmorency, 3rd Viscount Frankfort de Montmorency	5 June 1900	Edward O'Brien, 14th Baron Inchiquin	7 May 1902
Lucius O'Brien, 15th Baron Inchiquin	23 November 1900	George Dawson-Damer, 5th Earl of Portarlington	9 December 1929
Robert Butler, 16th Baron Dunboyne	4 January 1901	Geoffrey Browne-Guthrie, 2nd Baron Oranmore and Browne	29 August 1913
Anthony Nugent, 11th Earl of Westmeath	4 February 1901	Somerset Maxwell, 10th Baron Farnham	12 December 1933
Geoffrey Browne, 3rd Baron Oranmore and Browne	11 July 1902	Reymond de Montmorency, 3rd Viscount Frankfort de Montmorency	30 June 1927
Charles Bellew, 3rd Baron Bellew	1 August 1904	Mervyn Wingfield, 7th Viscount Powerscourt	15 July 1911
Ivo Bligh, 8th Earl of Darnley	10 March 1905	Cornwallis Maude, 1st Earl de Montalt	10 April 1927
Ralph Howard, 7th Earl of Wicklow	27 November 1905	John Butler, 6th Earl of Lanesborough	11 October 1946
George Curzon, 1st Baron Curzon of Kedleston	21 January 1908	Francis Browne, 4th Baron Kilmaine	20 March 1925
Frederic Trench, 3rd Baron Ashtown	4 November 1908	Lawrence Parsons, 4th Earl of Rosse	20 March 1946
Arthur Maxwell, 11th Baron Farnham	18 December 1908	Ponsonby Moore, 9th Earl of Drogheda	5 February 1957
Yvo Vesey, 5th Viscount de Vesci	13 February 1909	Hugh Annesley, 5th Earl of Annesley	16 August 1958
John Browne, 5th Baron Kilmaine	14 April 1911	Henry Ward, 5th Viscount Bangor	27 August 1946
William Parsons, 5th Earl of Rosse	9 October 1911	Charles Bellew, 3rd Baron Bellew	10 June 1918
John Beresford, 5th Baron Decies	18 November 1912	Edward Crofton, 3rd Baron Crofton	31 January 1944
Maxwell Ward, 6th Viscount Bangor	7 March 1913	Charles Allanson-Winn, 4th Baron Headley	17 November 1950
Charles Butler, 7th Earl of Lanesborough	2 June 1913	Somerset Lowry-Corry, 4th Earl Belmore	18 August 1929
Henry Moore, 10th Earl of Drogheda	21 November 1913	Robert Butler, 16th Baron Dunboyne	22 November 1957
George Bellew-Bryan, 4th Baron Bellew	20 April 1914	Dayrolles Eveleigh-de-Moleyns, 4th Baron Ventry	15 June 1935
George Bingham, 5th Earl of Lucan	10 August 1914	Charles Bingham, 4th Earl of Lucan	20 April 1949
Rudolph Lambart, 10th Earl of Cavan	24 September 1915	Francis Needham, 3rd Earl of Kilmorey	28 August 1946
Arthur Crofton, 4th Baron Crofton	10 January 1916	Frederic Trench, 3rd Baron Ashtown	15 June 1942
Francis Needham, 4th Earl of Kilmorey	14 February 1916	John Massy, 6th Baron Massy	11 January 1961
Henry King-Tenison, 9th Earl of Kingston	13 July 1917	Luke Dillon, 4th Baron Clonbrock	11 January 1946
James Caulfeild, 8th Viscount Charlemont	19 August 1918	William Parsons, 5th Earl of Rosse	30 August 1949
Robert Jocelyn, 8th Earl of Roden	22 December 1919	Hercules Rowley, 4th Baron Langford	30 October 1956

== Remaining representative peers after 1922 ==
Representative peer	Elected	Died
James Bernard, 4th Earl of Bandon	6 June 1881	18 May 1924
George Curzon, 1st Baron Curzon of Kedleston	21 January 1908	20 March 1925
Ivo Bligh, 8th Earl of Darnley	10 March 1905	10 April 1927
Geoffrey Browne, 3rd Baron Oranmore and Browne	11 July 1902	30 June 1927
Henry Prittie, 4th Baron Dunalley	9 October 1891	5 August 1927
Dermot Bourke, 7th Earl of Mayo	14 July 1890	31 December 1927
Thomas McClintock-Bunbury, 2nd Baron Rathdonnell	8 April 1889	22 May 1929
Hamilton Deane-Morgan, 4th Baron Muskerry	13 June 1892	9 June 1929
Charles Butler, 7th Earl of Lanesborough	2 June 1913	18 August 1929
Lucius O'Brien, 15th Baron Inchiquin	23 November 1900	9 December 1929
Anthony Nugent, 11th Earl of Westmeath	4 February 1901	12 December 1933
George Bellew-Bryan, 4th Baron Bellew	20 April 1914	15 June 1935
Albert Handcock, 5th Baron Castlemaine	7 March 1898	6 July 1937
Henry Upton, 4th Viscount Templetown	29 January 1894	30 September 1939
Arthur Crofton, 4th Baron Crofton	10 January 1916	15 June 1942
John Beresford, 5th Baron Decies	18 November 1912	31 January 1944
Henry King-Tenison, 9th Earl of Kingston	13 July 1917	11 January 1946
John Browne, 5th Baron Kilmaine	14 April 1911	27 August 1946
Rudolph Lambart, 10th Earl of Cavan	24 September 1915	28 August 1946
Ralph Howard, 7th Earl of Wicklow	27 November 1905	11 October 1946
George Bingham, 5th Earl of Lucan	10 August 1914	20 April 1949
James Caulfeild, 8th Viscount Charlemont	19 August 1918	30 August 1949
Maxwell Ward, 6th Viscount Bangor	7 March 1913	17 November 1950
Robert Jocelyn, 8th Earl of Roden	22 December 1919	30 October 1956
Arthur Maxwell, 11th Baron Farnham	18 December 1908	5 February 1957
Henry Moore, 10th Earl of Drogheda	21 November 1913	22 November 1957
Yvo Vesey, 5th Viscount de Vesci	13 February 1909	16 August 1958
Francis Needham, 4th Earl of Kilmorey	14 February 1916	11 January 1961

== Representative peers with a title in the Peerage of the United Kingdom ==
No	(Kingdom of Ireland) Representative peer	Elected	Died	(United Kingdom) Title	Created	Note
1	John Browne, 1st Marquess of Sligo	2 August 1800	2 January 1809	Baron Monteagle	20 February 1806	Both titles are extant
2	Richard Trench, 2nd Earl of Clancarty	16 December 1808	24 November 1837	Baron Trench	4 August 1815	Both titles are extant
2	Richard Trench, 2nd Earl of Clancarty	16 December 1808	24 November 1837	Viscount Clancarty	8 December 1823	Both titles are extant
3	John Cole, 2nd Earl of Enniskillen	13 October 1804	31 March 1840	Baron Grinstead	11 August 1815	Both titles are extant
4	Edmund Pery, 1st Earl of Limerick	2 August 1800	7 December 1844	Baron Foxford	11 August 1815	Both titles are extant
5	Richard Hely-Hutchinson, 1st Earl of Donoughmore	2 August 1800	22 August 1825	Viscount Hutchinson	14 July 1821	Both titles are extant
6	Henry Conyngham, 1st Marquess Conyngham	2 August 1800	28 December 1832	Baron Minster	17 July 1821	Both titles are extant
7	George King, 3rd Earl of Kingston	11 July 1807	18 October 1839	Baron Kingston	17 July 1821	Both titles are extant
8	Thomas Pakenham, 2nd Earl of Longford	2 August 1800	24 May 1835	Baron Silchester	17 July 1821	Both titles are extant
9	William O'Brien, 2nd Marquess of Thomond	2 March 1816	21 August 1846	Baron Tadcaster	3 July 1826	Both titles are extinct
10	Francis Caulfeild, 2nd Earl of Charlemont	12 December 1806	26 December 1863	Baron Charlemont	13 February 1837	Both titles are extinct
11	John Crichton, 3rd Earl Erne	24 July 1845	3 October 1885	Baron Fermanagh	13 January 1876	Both titles are extant
12	Mervyn Wingfield, 7th Viscount Powerscourt	26 December 1865	5 June 1904	Baron Powerscourt	27 June 1885	Both titles are extant
13	Cornwallis Maude, 4th Viscount Hawarden	2 December 1862	9 January 1905	Earl de Montalt	9 September 1886	UK title is extinct
14	George Curzon, 1st Baron Curzon of Kedleston	21 January 1908	20 March 1925	Earl Curzon of Kedleston	2 November 1911	Both titles are extinct
14	George Curzon, 1st Baron Curzon of Kedleston	21 January 1908	20 March 1925	Viscount Scarsdale	2 November 1911	UK title is extant
14	George Curzon, 1st Baron Curzon of Kedleston	21 January 1908	20 March 1925	Baron Ravensdale	2 November 1911	UK title is extant
15	George Curzon, 1st Baron Curzon of Kedleston	21 January 1908	20 March 1925	Marquess Curzon of Kedleston	28 June 1921	Both titles are extinct
16	Geoffrey Browne, 3rd Baron Oranmore and Browne	11 July 1902	30 June 1927	Baron Mereworth	19 January 1926	Both titles are extant
17	George Bingham, 5th Earl of Lucan	10 August 1914	20 April 1949	Baron Bingham	26 June 1934	Both titles are extant
18	Henry Moore, 10th Earl of Drogheda	21 November 1913	22 November 1957	Baron Moore	30 January 1954	Both titles are extant

== See also ==
- List of Scottish representative peers
