= Diana Maxwell, Baroness Farnham =

Lady of the Bedchamber to Queen Elizabeth II (1931–2021)

The Right Honourable The Lady Farnham DCVO JP
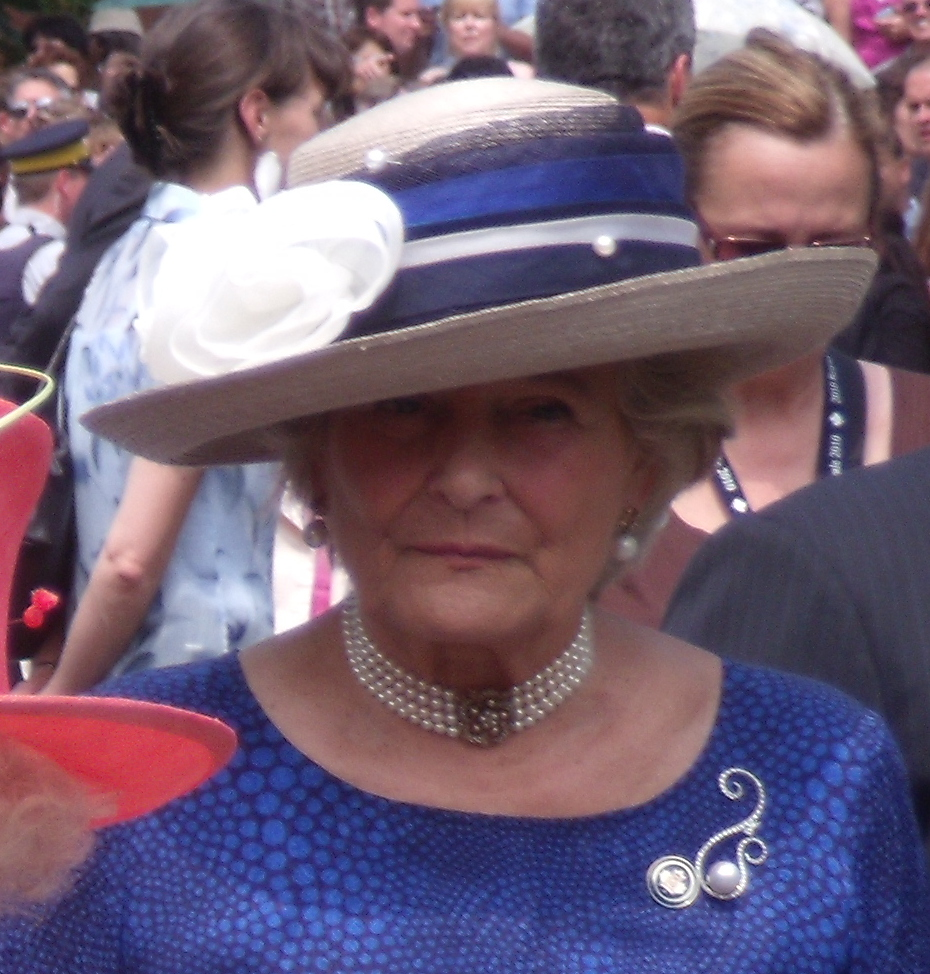
- Lady Farnham in 2010
- Born: Diana Marion Gunnis; 24 May 1931
- Died: 29 December 2021 (aged 90)
- Occupation: Lady of the Bedchamber to Queen Elizabeth II
- Spouse: Barry Maxwell, 12th Baron Farnham (m. 1959; died 2001)
- Children: 2

Diana Marion Maxwell, Baroness Farnham, DCVO, JP (née Gunnis; 24 May 1931 – 29 December 2021) was a British courtier who served as Lady of the Bedchamber to Queen Elizabeth II from 1987 until her death in 2021.

== Life ==
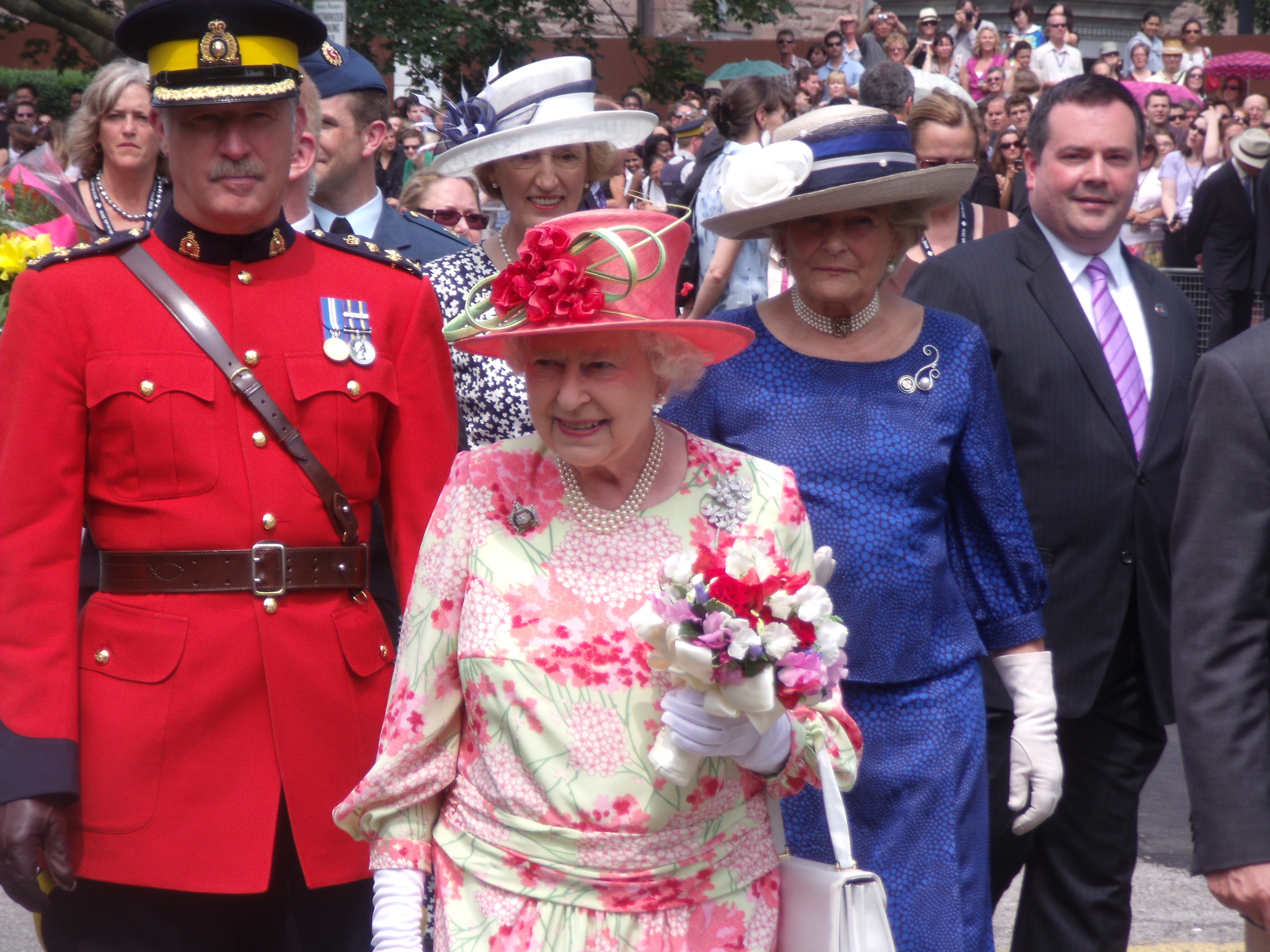
Lady Farnham walking behind Queen Elizabeth II on a visit to Toronto in 2010

Born Diana Marion Gunnis on 24 May 1931, she was the elder daughter of Nigel Eric Murray Gunnis, of Branden, Sissinghurst, Kent, and Elizabeth Mary Morrison, a first cousin of Lord Margadale. Her paternal grandmother, Ivy Marion Gunnis née Streatfeild, was a daughter of Marion Henrietta Smith of Blendon Hall, Kent, whose sister Frances was the paternal grandmother of Queen Elizabeth The Queen Mother, making her and Queen Elizabeth II third cousins. In 1959, she married Barry, 12th Baron Farnham. They adopted two daughters, Harriet and Sophia.

Lady Farnham was named a Lady of the Bedchamber to Queen Elizabeth II on 4 August 1987 upon the retirement of Patricia, Marchioness of Abergavenny. Owing to her connections to Ireland through her maternal grandmother, a daughter of Lord Trevor, Lady Farnham accompanied the Queen on her landmark state visit to the Republic of Ireland in 2011. In 2012, during the Diamond Jubilee, she notably rode alongside the Queen to St Paul's Cathedral for the Service of Thanksgiving after Prince Philip, Duke of Edinburgh, was hospitalized.

Lord and Lady Farnham donated the Farnham collection of photographs, mementos, letters, war medals and papers relating to the Farnham family and their connection to County Cavan to the Cavan County Museum and the National Library of Ireland.

She died on 29 December 2021 at the age of 90. Her funeral was held in the Chapel Royal, St James's Palace, on 14 January 2022. Her cousin the Hon. Mary Morrison represented the Queen, and the Duke and Duchess of Gloucester attended. Her ashes were interred in Kilmore Cathedral.

== Honours ==
| Country | Date | Appointment | Ribbon | Post-nominal letters | Notes |
|---|---|---|---|---|---|
| United Kingdom | 31 December 1997 | Commander of the Royal Victorian Order | | CVO | Promoted to DCVO in 2010 |
| United Kingdom | 12 June 2010 | Dame Commander of the Royal Victorian Order | | DCVO | |
| United Kingdom | 6 February 2002 | Queen Elizabeth II Golden Jubilee Medal | | | |
| United Kingdom | 6 February 2012 | Queen Elizabeth II Diamond Jubilee Medal | | | |
