= Somerset Maxwell (King's Lynn MP) =

Lieutenant-Colonel Somerset Arthur Maxwell (20 January 1905 – 30 December 1942) was a Conservative Party politician in the United Kingdom.

== Family ==
Eldest son of Arthur Kenlis Maxwell, 11th Baron Farnham. He married 1930 (Angela) Susan Roberts (d. 10 April 1953 Jamaica), daughter of Captain Marshall Owen Roberts (d 3 July 1931) by his former wife Irene Helene Murray of the dukes of Atholl, and sister of the aviator Owen Roberts and had issue:

- Barry Owen Somerset Maxwell, 12th Baron Farnham.
- Simon Kenlis Maxwell, 13th Baron Farnham
- Sheelin Virginia Maxwell, married David Knollys, 3rd Viscount Knollys.

== Political career ==
He was elected as member of parliament (MP) for the King's Lynn constituency in Norfolk at the 1935 general election, succeeding the Conservative MP Lord Fermoy, who had held the seat since the 1924 election. From the 1920s he had been an officer in the 2nd Cavalry Divisional Signals (Middlesex Yeomanry). In December 1942, Lieutenant Colonel Maxwell died of wounds received in action at El Alamein on active service in World War II, aged 37. At the resulting by-election in February 1943, Lord Fermoy was re-elected.

== Death and funeral ==
In the morning of the new Year's Eve we had news that Lt. Colonel the Honourable Somerset Maxwell, O.C. Middlesex Yeomanry, sometime Parliamentary Secretary to the Minister for War, and M.P. for Kings Lynn had died at 2030 hrs. the previous night following wounds sustained in action. The funeral was to be the same afternoon and as the cemetery was nearby we old originals turned out. When we arrived our party brought the M.Y. contingent up to 30 exclusive of bearer party and officers. The plain coffin was slid off the ambulance on to the shoulders of 8 NCOs and OCTU cadets and preceded by the chaplain passed through the ranks of the firing party who stood at the Present. Behind followed General Penney, DSO, MC, Colonel Messel, former C.O. of the unit and several other officers of ours, after them came ourselves who have served under him for so long, the journey was short but at the slow march it seemed a long way, we formed up round the coffin on which the flag trembled in the wind. The service was almost inaudible as planes taking off nearby drowned everything, except the words of the 23rd. Psalm. They lowered the coffin into the grave, and the escort fired three rounds into the air and the bugler's sobbing notes ran from Last Post to Reveille. The wreaths were placed and one by one we stepped up to the grave and made our last salutes. .. .. .

Parliament of the United Kingdom
Preceded by Lord Fermoy	Member of Parliament for King's Lynn; 1935–1942	Succeeded by Lord Fermoy
