= Eyre Massey, 4th Baron Clarina =

British Army officer

General The Right Honourable The Lord Clarina CB
- Born: 29 April 1830
- Died: 16 December 1897 (aged 67)
- Military career
- Allegiance: United Kingdom
- Branch: British Army
- Rank: General
- Commands: 95th Regiment of Foot; Dublin District
- Conflicts: Crimean War; Indian Rebellion of 1857
- Awards: Companion of the Order of the Bath

General Eyre Challoner Henry Massey, 4th Baron Clarina, CB (29 April 1830 – 16 December 1897) was a British Army officer who became colonel of the Durham Light Infantry.

== Military career ==
Massey was commissioned as an ensign in the 68th Light Infantry on 8 October 1847. He saw action with the 95th Regiment of Foot during the Crimean War and, having been promoted to major on 17 November 1857, commanded his regiment during operations to quell the Indian Rebellion of 1857. He went on to be General Officer Commanding Dublin District in 1881. He also became colonel of the Durham Light Infantry and served as an Irish representative peer between 1888 and 1897.

== Arms ==
Coat of arms of Eyre Massey, 4th Baron Clarina

Crest
Out of a ducal coronet Or a bull's head Gules armed Sable.
Escutcheon
Argent on a chevron between three fusils Sable a lion passant Or.
Supporters
Two grenadier soldiers in the uniform of the 27th Foot Proper each holding in his exterior hand a sword also Proper.
Motto
Pro Libertate Patriae

Peerage of Ireland
Preceded by Eyre Massey	Baron Clarina; 1872 – 1897	Succeeded by Lionel Edward Massey
Political offices
Preceded by The Earl of Lucan	Representative peer for Ireland; 1888–1897	Succeeded by The Lord Castlemaine
