= Frederick Trench, 3rd Baron Ashtown =

Anglo-Irish landowner and opponent of the United Irish League

Lord Ashtown
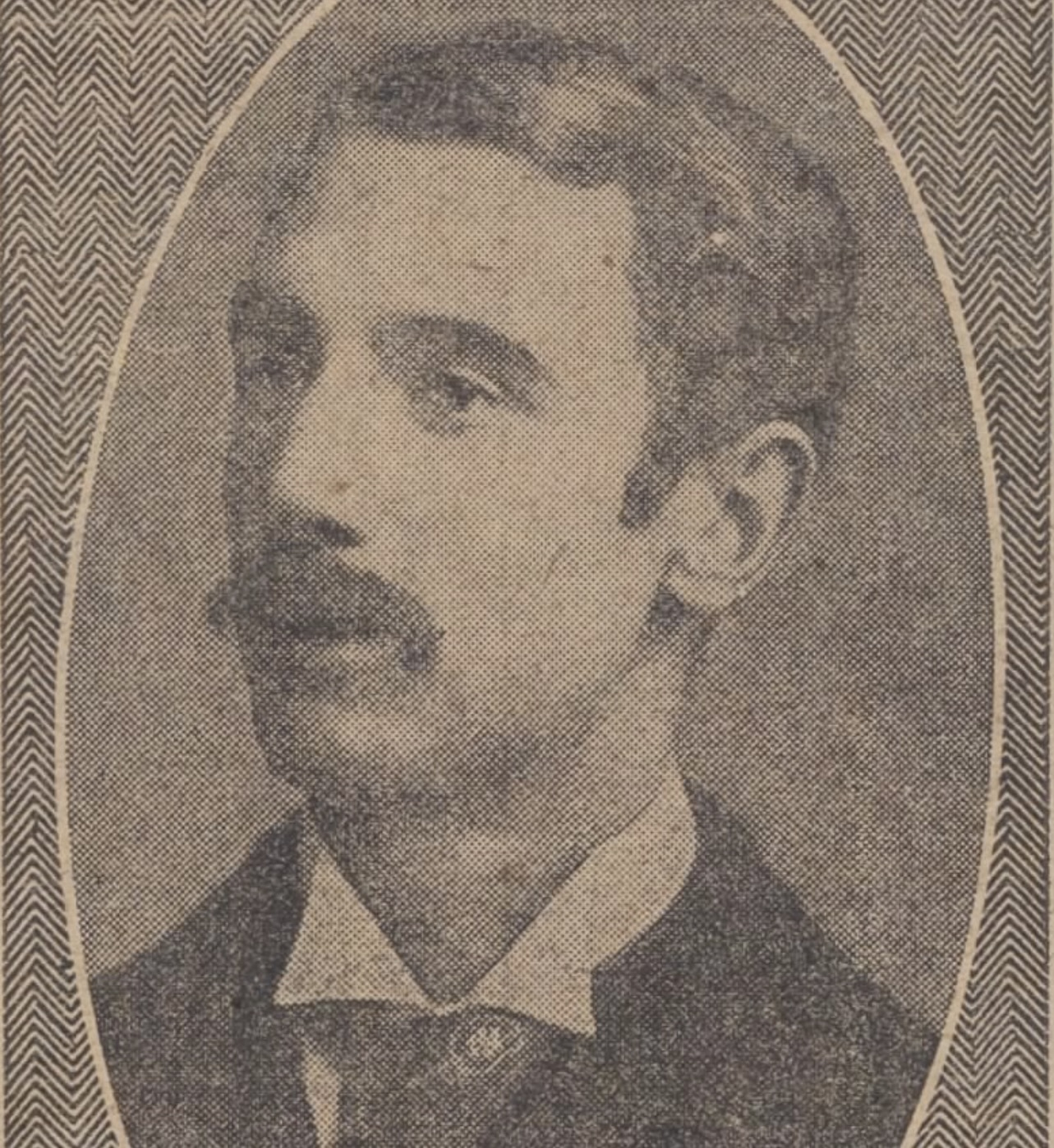
- Ashtown c. 1908

Member of the House of Lords
- Lord Temporal
- as an Irish representative peer 4 November 1908 – 28 October 1915

Personal details
- Born: 2 February 1868
- Died: 20 March 1946 (aged 78)
- Spouse: Violet Cosby (m. 1894)
- Relations: Frederick Tench (grandfather)
- Education: Eton College
- Alma mater: Magdalen College, Oxford

Frederick Oliver Trench, 3rd Baron Ashtown (2 February 1868 – 20 March 1946) was an Anglo-Irish landowner and opponent of the United Irish League. He was also an Irish representative peer in the House of Lords from 1908 to 1915.

== Biography ==
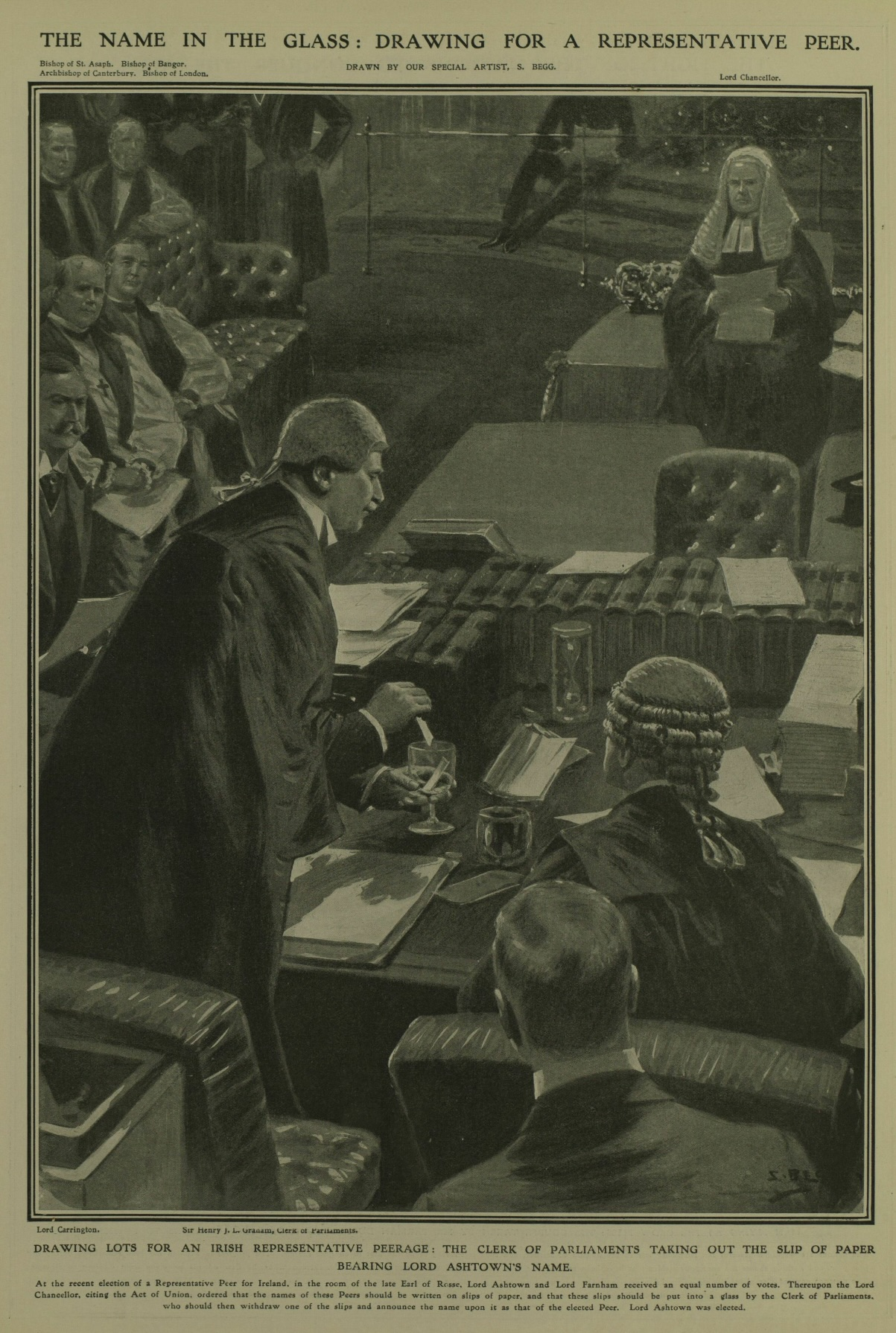
Illustrated London News item depicting Ashtown's election to the House of Lords in November 1908

Frederick Oliver Trench was the eldest son of Frederick Sydney Charles Trench (heir apparent to the 2nd Lord Ashtown) and Anne Le Poer Trench (eldest daughter of the 3rd Earl of Clancarty of Garbally). At the age of twelve, he became the 3rd Baron Ashtown and inherited a vast estate and reputedly over a million pounds. Some of his County Galway estate was located in Killimordaly. According to valuation records he was landlord for the following townlands: Caraunbeg, Caraunmore, Creevagh, Dooghloon, Gortnaboha and Island. He owned about 22,000 acres in Ireland.

Ashtown was educated at Eton College and Magdalen College, Oxford. He was a hard-line Unionist; in 1906–10 he edited a monthly publication, Grievances from Ireland, which denounced all political expressions of Irish nationalism as treasonable. His hunting lodge at Ballymacarbry, County Waterford, was damaged by bombs and arson in 1907 and destroyed by the Irish Republican Army during the War of Independence.

Ashtown was elected as an Irish representative peer in the House of Lords in November 1908, after an unsuccessful attempt in January 1908. He and Arthur Maxwell, 11th Baron Farnham, received an equal number of votes, with his name ultimately drawn from a glass in according with the procedures of the House. He was declared bankrupt in 1912, but his seat in the House of Lords was not declared vacant until 1915. He was also elected to the Galway County Council in 1911, to "the surprise and dismay of nationalist commentators".

== Legal issues ==
In 1907, a "crude bomb" exploded at Ashtown's residence in Waterford, which he attributed to supporters of the boycott against his properties. However, local officials considered it to have been a publicity stunt orchestrated by Ashtown. He was charged with staging the bombing but was acquitted due to inconclusive evidence.

In 1924, Ashtown was arrested in Dublin and charged with assaulting two schoolboys on separate occasions while travelling on the Dublin and South Eastern Railway. He was held on remand, with bail being refused. He eventually pleaded guilty to common assault and was fined £100 (equivalent to $5,000 in 2023), with costs of £30 (equivalent to $1,500 in 2023). According to the Dictionary of Irish Biography, the assaults were of a sexual nature, although Ashtown justified them as a "misunderstanding of his habit of slapping people on the knee or back while talking to them".

== Personal life ==
In 1894, Ashtown married Violet Grace Cosby, with whom he had four sons and a daughter. Two of his sons, Frederic Sydney Trench and Arthur Cosby Trench, died in World War I. His eldest at the Somme in 1916 and his youngest of the Spanish flu in 1918. He died on 20 March 1946, aged 77, and was succeeded in the barony by his second son Robert Power Trench.

== See also ==
- January 1908 Irish representative peer election, Ashtown finished runner-up.

Peerage of Ireland
Preceded by Frederic Trench	Baron Ashtown; 1880–1946	Succeeded by Robert Trench
Political offices
Preceded by The Earl of Rosse	Representative peer for Ireland disqualified due to bankruptcy 1908–1915	Succeeded by The Lord Crofton
