= William Mellish (victualler) =

English businessman (c. 1763–1834)

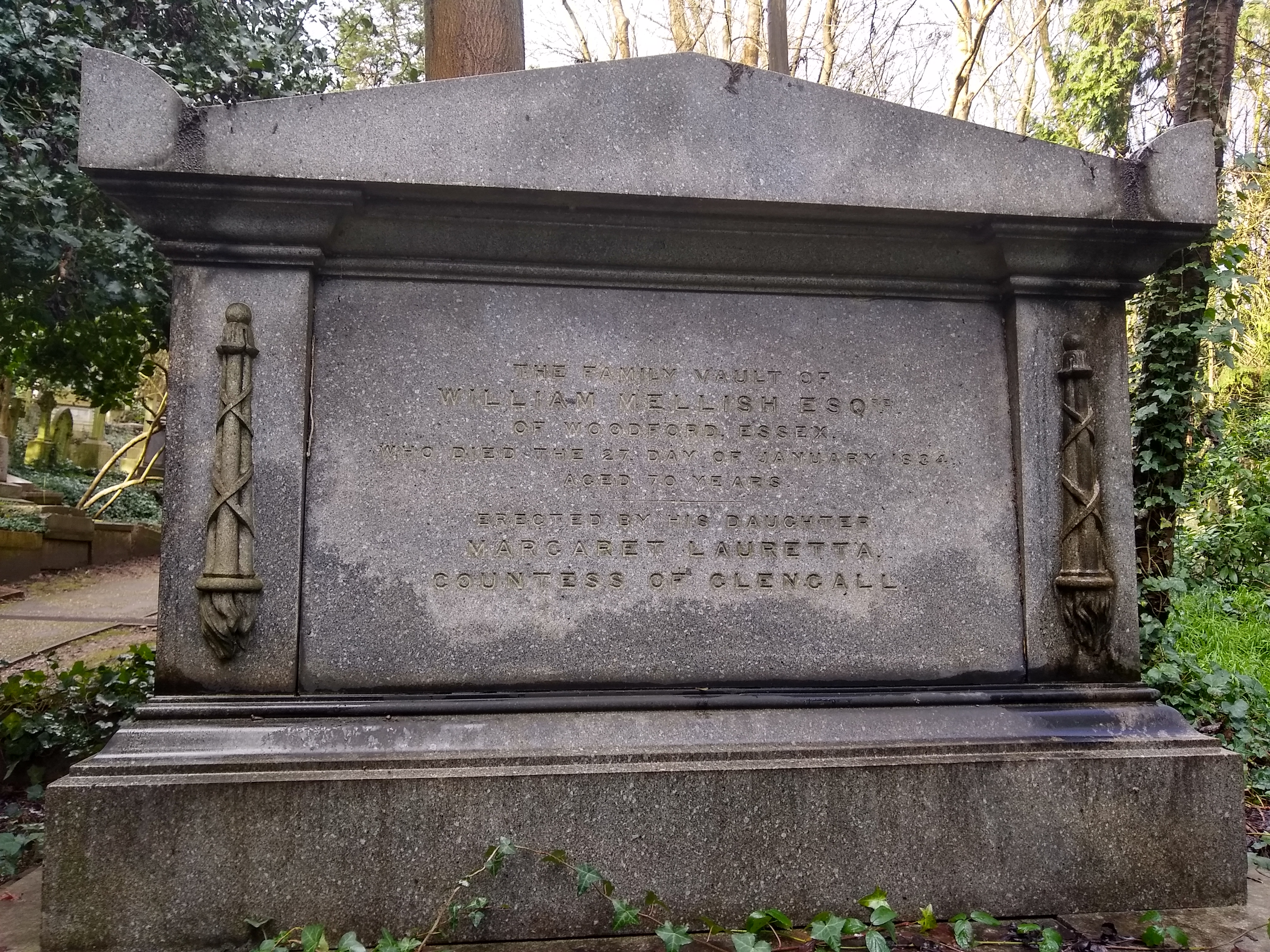
- Family vault of William Mellish in Highgate Cemetery (west)
- Born: c. 1763
- Died: 1834 (aged 70–71)
- Occupation: Businessman

William Mellish (c. 1763–1834) was an English businessman who was involved in supplying the Royal Navy, particularly during the American War of Independence. He also owned or partly owned a number of whaling ships.

== Career ==
For much of his career, he was in business with his brother Peter Mellish. Their father, Peter Mellish, Sr., had been a butcher in Shadwell, and they bid to supply the Navy with beef under a competitive tendering procedure. Thus, for example, in 1794 they won the contract to supply 3,000 head of oxen for sea stores.

== Legacy ==
His estate was worth about £3m when he died. He had two heirs, his daughters Elizabeth and Margaret Lauretta, who both married improvident aristocrats: Elizabeth married Lord Edward Thynne in 1830, and Margaret married The 2nd Earl of Glengall in 1834. The same year Margaret paid for a family vault for her father in Highgate Cemetery.

In 1847, Elizabeth unsuccessfully attempted to gain a greater share of their father's estate with a court case. The trustees of the estate also felt concern over the profligacy of Lord Glengall, an Anglo-Irish nobleman, who went bankrupt in 1849 during the Great Famine in Ireland, a status he retained until his death in 1858. The trustees were able to sell much of the family estates in Ireland in 1853 through the Encumbered Estates' Court, with much of the land being subsequently bought back.

He was originally buried in Wapping, with his father Peter Mellish, his mother and brother, all of whom were removed and interred in the family vault in Highgate Cemetery when the Wapping Church was closed.
