= Arthur Maxwell, 11th Baron Farnham =

Irish peer, Nova Scotia baronet (1879–1957)

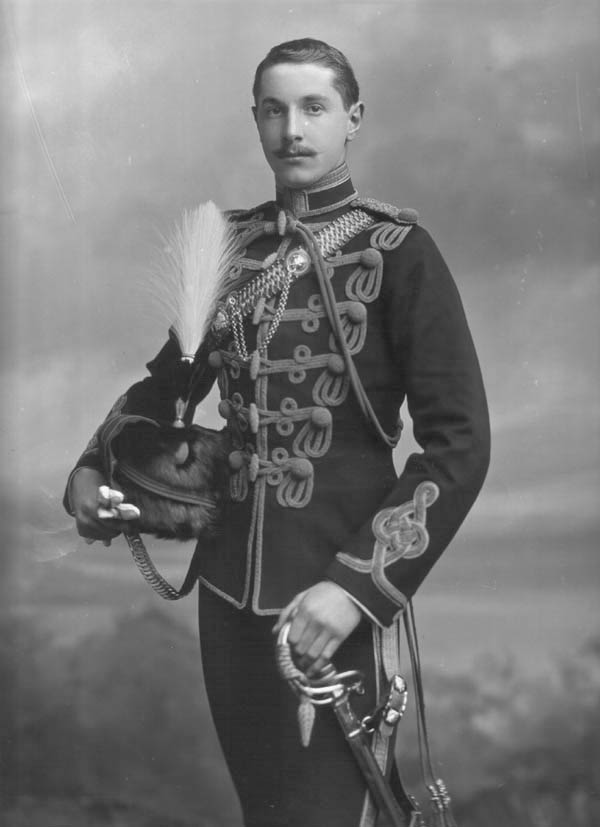
The Hon. Arthur Maxwell, as he was at the time, photographed 2 December 1899, in Levée Dress, 2nd Lieutenant, 10th (Prince of Wales's Own Royal) Hussars.

The Rt Hon. Arthur Kenlis Maxwell, 11th Baron Farnham, DSO (2 October 1879 – 5 February 1957), was a British Army officer, an Irish representative peer and a Nova Scotia baronet.

He was the son of the 10th Baron Farnham and Lady Florence Jane Taylour, a daughter of the 3rd Marquess of Headfort. On his father's death in November 1900, he succeeded as the 11th Baron Farnham (and 14th in the family Baronetcy) and inherited the Farnham Estate, County Cavan.

He was educated at the Royal Military Academy Sandhurst and received his first commission as second lieutenant in the 10th Hussars on 12 August 1899. The regiment had embarked for South Africa to fight in the Second Boer War in November 1899, and Maxwell joined them in March 1900, travelling on the SS British Prince. Shortly after arrival he was promoted to lieutenant on 1 April 1900. Following the end of the war in 1902, his regiment went to India. Lord Farnham joined almost 375 officers and men of the 10th Hussars who left Cape Town on the SS Lake Manitoba in September 1902, arriving at Bombay the following month, and was then stationed at Mhow in Bombay Presidency.

During the First World War, he was Lieutenant-Colonel of the North Irish Horse. He was appointed to the Distinguished Service Order (DSO) in 1918 for his service in World War I.

On 18 December 1908, he was elected an Irish Representative peer. He sat in the House of Lords as a member of the Irish Unionist Alliance, and became its closing leader of Southern Unionists after the 1919 split in the party and which ceased operations after the Anglo-Irish Treaty, 1921.

Lord Longford spoke of Lord Farnham while giving a speech in the House of Lords in 1995:

Every year there was a tennis dance at Farnham Castle, overlooking the [tennis] courts. Every year Lord Farnham, who was a loyal Britisher, insisted on "God Save the King" being played. It was during the 1930s. Of course, a number of local nationalists would walk out and therefore there was always a question of whether the dance would take place. I hope that when we in this House think of Lord Farnham—this House is the most loyal of British Chambers—we shall think of him having "God Save the King" played 15 years after the signing of the treaty. That was the only place in Ireland where it was played."

Lord Farnham married on 8 October 1903 Aileen Selina Coote, daughter of Charles Purdon Coote and Lydia Wingfield-Digby. His son, Somerset, died of wounds in 1942 at the Battle of El Alamein, and so on his own death in 1957 in a Dublin nursing home, his titles and his estate, which UK part amounted to £22,810, passed to his grandson, Barry. His granddaughter Sheelin married The 3rd Viscount Knollys.

== See also ==
- January 1908 Irish representative peer election, Farnham finished third.

== Notes ==
Peerage of Ireland
Preceded by Somerset Maxwell	Baron Farnham; 1900–1957	Succeeded by Barry Maxwell
Political offices
Preceded by The Earl of Drogheda	Representative peer for Ireland; 1908–1957	Office lapsed
