= Richard Butler, 2nd Earl of Glengall =

Irish politician and peer

Richard Butler
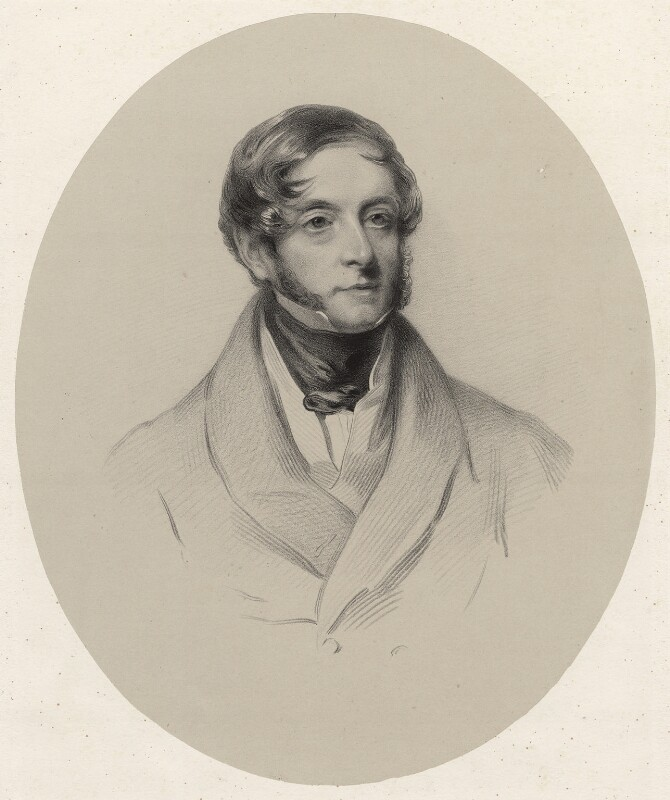
- The 2nd Earl of Glengall in 1854 by Richard James Lane

Representative peer for Ireland
- In office 1829-1858

Member of Parliament for County Tipperary
- In office 1818-1819

Personal details
- Born: 17 May 1794
- Died: 22 June 1858 (aged 64)
- Party: Tory
- Spouse: Margaret Mellish (m. 1834)
- Children: 2
- Parent: Richard Butler (father)
- Relatives: James Butler (grandfather); William Mellish (father-in-law)

The Rt Hon. Richard Butler, 2nd Earl of Glengall (17 May 1794 – 22 June 1858), styled Viscount Cahir between January 1816 and January 1819, was an Irish Tory politician and peer.

== Biography ==
The son of The 1st Earl of Glengall and Emily Jefferys, on 17 July 1818, then-Viscount Cahir was elected as the Member of Parliament for County Tipperary. Seven months later he succeeded to his father's title and resigned his seat. On 1 September 1829, Lord Glengall was elected as an Irish representative peer, in succession to The 1st Earl of Blessington, and took his seat in the House of Lords on the Tory benches in February 1830.

On 20 February 1834, Lord Glengall married Margaret Lauretta Mellish, the daughter of William Mellish, and together they had two daughters. Having no male issue, his titles (including the Cahir Barony of 1583) became extinct upon his death in 1858.

Parliament of the United Kingdom
Preceded by Montague James Mathew; Francis Aldborough Prittie	Member of Parliament for County Tipperary; 1818 – 1819; With: Montague James Mathew	Succeeded by Montague James Mathew; William Bagwell
Political offices
Preceded by The Earl of Blessington	Representative peer for Ireland; 1829–1858	Succeeded by The Earl of Bandon
Peerage of Ireland
Preceded by Richard Butler	Earl of Glengall; 1788–1858	Extinct
