= A.P.W. Malcomson =

Archivist and historian

Anthony Peter William Malcomson (born 12 March 1945) is an archivist and historian specialising in the history of the Anglo-Irish ascendancy. He was educated at Campbell College, Belfast, and Emmanuel College, Cambridge. He completed his post graduate studies at Queen's University and was awarded his Ph.D. in history in 1970. Most of his working life was spent in the Public Record Office of Northern Ireland, of which he was director from 1988 until his retirement in 1998.

He is a prolific author. Professor Cormac Ó Gráda has said: "Anthony Malcomson produces erudite books almost as fast as Joseph Haydn produced symphonies or Donizetti bel canto operas.

He was elected a member of the Royal Irish Academy in 1987.

In January 2023 he was conferred with an honorary doctorate of letters by the University of Limerick. The citation recorded:

"Dr. Malcomson led a vital effort in recovering and locating archival material across Ireland and Britain as a substitute for what had been lost in 1922 when the records of the Irish state going back to the twelfth century were destroyed as the result of the occupation of the Four Courts by anti-treaty insurgents...His travels around Ireland rescuing vulnerable collections happened at a time when Ireland's underfunded national archival institutions were unable or unwilling to take on the task."

== Publications include ==
- Malcomson, A.P.W., The Maxwells of Finnebrogue and the gentry of Co. Down, c. 1600-1963: a resident and responsible elite, Ulster Historical Foundation (2023).
- Malcomson, A.P.W., Nathaniel Clements, 1705-77: Politics, Fashion and Architecture in Mid-Eighteenth Century Ireland, Four Courts Press (2015).
- Malcomson, A.P.W., John Foster (1740-1828): The Politics of Improvement and Prosperity. Four Courts Press (2011).
- Malcomson, A.P.W ., (ed.) The Clements Archive, Irish Manuscripts Commission (2010).
- Malcomson, A.P.W. and Walsh, Patrick (eds.) The Conolly Archive, Irish Manuscripts Commission (2010).
- Malcomson, A.P.W., Virtues of a Wicked Earl: The Life and Legend of William Sydney Clements, 3rd Earl of Leitrim, 1806-78, Four Courts Press (2009).
- Malcomson, A.P.W., (ed.) Calendar of the Rosse Papers, Irish Manuscripts Commission (2007).
- Malcomson, A.P.W., 'The fall of the house of Conolly [of Castletown, Co. Kildare], 1758-1803', in Allan Blackstock and Eoin Magennis (co.-eds.), Politics and political culture: essays in tribute to Peter Jupp Ulster Historical Foundation (Belfast, 2007)
- Malcomson, A.P.W., The Pursuit of the Heiress: Aristocratic Marriage in Ireland 1740-1840, Ulster Historical Foundation (2006)
- Malcomson, A.P.W., (ed.) The De Vesci Papers, Irish Manuscripts Commission (2006)
- Malcomson, A.P.W., Nathaniel Clements: Government and the Governing Elite in Ireland, 1725-75, Four Courts Press (2005)
- D.A. Fleming and Malcomson, A.P.W. (eds.), "A Volley of Execrations", the Letters and Papers of John Fitzgibbon: Earl of Clare, 1772-1802, Irish Manuscripts Commission (2005)
- Malcomson, A.P.W., Primate Robinson: 1709-94, Ulster Historical Foundation (2003)
- Malcomson, A.P.W., 'A house divided: the Loftus family, earls and marquesses of Ely, c. 1600-c. 1900', in David Dickson and Cormac O'Grada (co.-eds), Refiguring Ireland: essays in honour of L.M. Cullen (Dublin, 2003)
- Malcomson, A.P.W., Archbishop Charles Agar: Churchmanship and Politics in Ireland 1760-1810, Four Courts Press (2002)
- Malcomson, A.P.W., 'The Irish peerage and the Act of Union, 1800-1971', in The Transactions of the Royal Historical Society, 6th ser, vol. x (2000)
- Malcomson, A.P.W., Eighteenth century Irish official records in Great Britain 2 vols, PRONI (1990)
- Malcomson, A.P.W., 'A lost natural leader: John James Hamilton, first marquess of Abercorn (1756-1818)', in Proc. RIA, vol. 88, sec. C, no. 4 (1988)
- Malcomson, A.P.W., 'The Treaty of Paris and Ireland', in Prosser Gifford (ed.), The Treaty of Paris (1783) in a changing states system (Lanham, MD, 1985)
- Malcomson, A.P.W., "Lord Shannon" in Esther Hewitt (ed.), Lord Shannon's Letters to his Son, PRONI (1982), pp xxiii-lxxix.
- Malcomson, A.P.W., 'The parliamentary traffic of this country', in Thomas Bartlett and D.W. Hayton (co.-eds.), Penal era and golden age: essays in Irish history, 1690-1800 Ulster Historical Foundation (Belfast, 1979)
- Malcomson, A.P.W., John Foster: The Politics of the Anglo-Irish Ascendancy, Institute of Irish Studies (QUB)/Oxford University Press (1978)
- Malcomson, A.P.W., 'Absenteeism in eighteenth-century Ireland', in Irish Economic and Social History, vol. i (1974)
- Malcomson, A.P.W., 'The Newtown Act: revision and reconstruction;, in Irish Historical Studies, vo. 18 (1974)
- Malcomson, A.P.W., 'Speaker Pery and the Pery papers', in The North Munster Antiquarian Journal, vol. 16 (1973-4)
- Malcomson, A.P.W., 'John Foster and the speakership of the Irish House of Commons', in Proc. RIA, vol. 72, sec. C, no. 11 (1972)
