= Members of the 3rd UK Parliament from Ireland =

2nd Parliament	(1802)
3rd Parliament	(1806)

This is a list of the MPs for Irish constituencies, who were elected at the 1806 United Kingdom general election, to serve as members of the 3rd UK Parliament from Ireland, or who were elected at subsequent by-elections. There were 100 seats representing Ireland in this Parliament.

This was the second United Kingdom general election, as the House of Commons of the 1st Parliament was chosen from the members of the Parliament of Great Britain and the Parliament of Ireland and not by a popular election.

The 3rd United Kingdom Parliament was elected between 29 October and 17 December 1806, as at this period the exact date for the election in each constituency was fixed by the Returning Officer. The Parliament first assembled on 13 December, for a maximum duration of seven years from that date. It was dissolved on 29 April 1807 (a length of four months and sixteen days - the shortest UK Parliament ever).

== Summary of results by party (Ireland only) ==
The names of and votes for candidates at elections are based on Walker. Party labels are based on those used by Stooks Smith and may differ from those in other sources. Many early nineteenth century Irish MPs are not classified by party, by Stooks Smith.

In some cases, when a party label is used for the MP by Stooks Smith in a subsequent Parliament, this is noted in the Members list below.

At the dissolution of the 2nd Parliament, the MPs by party (calculated as above), were

Tory 43, Whig 31, Other (unclassified) 26: Total 100.

The summary results of the 1806 general election, in Ireland, were as follows.

Party	Candidates	Unopposed	Votes	%	Seats election	Seats dissolution
Tory ^{a}	55	35	19,064	56.00	50	50 ^{b}
Whig ^{a}	43	32	10,265	30.15	36	36 ^{b}
Other	17	12	4,714	13.85	14	14
Total	115	79	34,043	100.00	100	100

Notes:

- ^{a} One Whig and three Tory candidates each contested and won two constituencies. The Right Hon. Maurice Fitzgerald, the Knight of Kerry (Whig) was elected for Kerry and Tralee. He chose to represent Kerry. Sir George Fitzgerald Hill, Bt (Tory) was returned by the boroughs of Coleraine and Londonderry. He decided to represent the latter seat. The Hon. George Knox (Tory) won Dublin University and Dungannon. He decided to sit for Dublin University. Nathaniel Sneyd (Tory) was elected by Cavan and Enniskillen. He retained the Cavan seat. Each candidacy is counted separately in the table.
- ^{b} It is possible that there was a petition following the election at Downpatrick, which resulted in Edward Southwell Ruthven (Whig) being unseated and John Wilson Croker (Tory) being declared duly elected. Walker does not refer to this petition, but Stooks Smith mentions one. If this change did take place then there should be one more Tory member and one less Whig at the dissolution.

== General election results by constituency ==
Constituency	Votes Tory		Votes Whig	Votes other		Result
County Antrim; 2 members	Unopp.	-	-	-	-	T hold ^{1}
County Antrim; 2 members	Unopp.	-	-	-	-	T hold ^{1}
Armagh	Unopp.	-	-	-	-	T hold ^{1}
County Armagh; 2 members	Unopp.	-	-	-	-	T hold ^{1}
County Armagh; 2 members	-	-	Unopp.	-	-	W hold ^{1}
Athlone	-	-	Unopp.	-	-	W gain from O
Bandon	Unopp.	-	-	-	-	T gain from W
Belfast	Unopp.	-	-	-	-	T hold ^{1}
Carlow	-	-	-	Unopp.	-	O hold
County Carlow; 2 members	-	-	Unopp.	-	-	W hold ^{1}
County Carlow; 2 members	-	-	Unopp.	-	-	W hold ^{1}
Carrickfergus	Unopp.	-	-	-	-	T hold ^{1}
Cashel	-	-	Unopp.	-	-	W hold
County Cavan; 2 members	Unopp.	-	-	-	-	T hold ^{1}
County Cavan; 2 members	Unopp.	-	-	-	-	T gain from W
County Clare; 2 members	-	-	-	Unopp.	-	O hold ^{1}
County Clare; 2 members	-	-	-	Unopp.	-	O hold ^{1}
Clonmel	Unopp.	-	-	-	-	T hold ^{1}
Coleraine	Unopp.	-	-	-	-	T hold
Cork; 2 members	Unopp.	-	-	-	-	T hold ^{1}
Cork; 2 members	-	-	Unopp.	-	-	W hold ^{1}
County Cork; 2 members	-	-	Unopp.	-	-	W gain from O ^{1}
County Cork; 2 members	-	-	Unopp.	-	-	W gain from O
County Donegal; 2 members	Unopp.	-	-	-	-	T hold ^{1}
County Donegal; 2 members	Unopp.	-	-	-	-	T hold
County Down; 2 members	-	-	-	Unopp.	-	O hold ^{1}
County Down; 2 members	-	-	-	Unopp.	-	O hold ^{1}
Downpatrick	105	-	119	-	-	W gain from O
Drogheda	Unopp.	-	-	-	-	T gain from O
Dublin; 2 members	1,638	-	1,522	-	-	T hold ^{1}
Dublin; 2 members	-	-	1,675	-	-	W hold
County Dublin; 2 members	545	-	-	-	-	T hold ^{1}
County Dublin; 2 members	455	-	357	-	-	T hold ^{1}
Dublin University	35	32	-	-	-	T hold ^{1}
Dundalk	Unopp.	-	-	-	-	T hold
Dungannon	Unopp.	-	-	-	-	T hold ^{1}
Dungarvan	-	-	Unopp.	-	-	W hold
Ennis	Unopp.	-	-	-	-	T hold ^{1}
Enniskillen	Unopp.	-	-	-	-	T hold
County Fermanagh; 2 members	1,260	413	-	-	-	T hold ^{1}
County Fermanagh; 2 members	1,416	623	-	-	-	T hold ^{1}
Galway Borough	Unopp.	-	-	-	-	T hold ^{1}
County Galway; 2 members	2,012	-	-	1,770	-	T gain from O ^{1}
County Galway; 2 members	3,305	-	-	-	-	T hold ^{1}
County Kerry; 2 members	-	-	Unopp.	-	-	W hold ^{1}
County Kerry; 2 members	-	-	Unopp.	-	-	W gain from T
County Kildare; 2 members	-	-	Unopp.	-	-	W hold ^{1}
County Kildare; 2 members	-	-	Unopp.	-	-	W hold ^{1}
Kilkenny	-	-	Unopp.	-	-	W hold ^{1}
County Kilkenny; 2 members	-	-	Unopp.	-	-	W hold ^{1}
County Kilkenny; 2 members	-	-	Unopp.	-	-	W hold
King's County; 2 members	Unopp.	-	-	-	-	T hold ^{1}
King's County; 2 members	Unopp.	-	-	-	-	T hold ^{1}
Kinsale	-	-	Unopp.	-	-	W hold ^{1}
County Leitrim; 2 members	759	-	-	-	-	T hold ^{1}
County Leitrim; 2 members	607	-	365	-	-	T gain from W
Limerick	Unopp.	-	-	-	-	T hold ^{1}
County Limerick; 2 members	-	-	-	851	-	O hold ^{1}
County Limerick; 2 members	-	-	-	628	225	O hold
Lisburn	Unopp.	-	-	-	-	T hold ^{1}
Londonderry	Unopp.	-	-	-	-	T hold ^{1}
County Londonderry; 2 members	1,397	-	978	-	-	T hold ^{1}
County Londonderry; 2 members	1,123	-	608	-	-	T hold ^{1}
County Longford; 2 members	Unopp.	-	-	-	-	T hold ^{1}
County Longford; 2 members	Unopp.	-	-	-	-	T gain from O
County Louth; 2 members	Unopp.	-	-	-	-	T gain from O ^{1}
County Louth; 2 members	Unopp.	-	-	-	-	T gain from O
Mallow	-	-	Unopp.	-	-	W hold ^{1}
County Mayo; 2 members	3,768	-	-	-	-	T hold ^{1}
County Mayo; 2 members	-	-	3,768	1,240	-	W hold ^{1}
County Meath; 2 members	-	-	Unopp.	-	-	W hold ^{1}
County Meath; 2 members	-	-	Unopp.	-	-	W hold ^{1}
County Monaghan; 2 members	-	-	-	Unopp.	-	O hold ^{1}
County Monaghan; 2 members	Unopp.	-	-	-	-	T hold ^{1}
New Ross	-	-	-	Unopp.	-	O hold
Newry	142	-	121	-	-	T gain from W
Portarlington	-	-	-	Unopp.	-	O hold
Queen's County; 2 members	Unopp.	-	-	-	-	T gain from O ^{1}
Queen's County; 2 members	-	-	Unopp.	-	-	W hold ^{1}
County Roscommon; 2 members	-	-	Unopp.	-	-	W hold ^{1}
County Roscommon; 2 members	-	-	Unopp.	-	-	W hold
Sligo	Unopp.	-	-	-	-	T hold ^{1}
County Sligo; 2 members	-	-	Unopp.	-	-	W hold ^{1}
County Sligo; 2 members	Unopp.	-	-	-	-	T hold
County Tipperary; 2 members	-	-	Unopp.	-	-	W gain from O
County Tipperary; 2 members	-	-	Unopp.	-	-	W gain from O
Tralee	-	-	Unopp.	-	-	W gain from T
County Tyrone; 2 members	-	-	-	Unopp.	-	O hold ^{1}
County Tyrone; 2 members	-	-	-	Unopp.	-	O hold
Waterford	-	-	Unopp.	-	-	W hold ^{1}
County Waterford; 2 members	454	-	285	-	-	T hold ^{1}
County Waterford; 2 members	5	-	427	-	-	W hold
County Westmeath; 2 members	-	-	-	Unopp.	-	O hold ^{1}
County Westmeath; 2 members	-	-	-	Unopp.	-	O hold ^{1}
Wexford	Unopp.	-	-	-	-	T hold
County Wexford; 2 members	-	-	Unopp.	-	-	W hold ^{1}
County Wexford; 2 members	-	-	Unopp.	-	-	W gain from T
County Wicklow; 2 members	-	-	Unopp	-	-	W hold ^{1}
County Wicklow; 2 members	-	-	Unopp.	-	-	W hold ^{1}
Youghal	Unopp.	-	-	-	-	T hold
Constituency	Votes Tory		Votes Whig	Votes other		Result

Note:-

- ^{1} Incumbent re-elected

== Members by constituency ==
The list is given in alphabetical order by constituency. The County prefixes used for county constituencies is disregarded in determining alphabetical order, but the county follows any borough or city constituency with the same name.

The name of an MP who served during the Parliament, but who was not the holder of a seat at the dissolution in 1807, is given in italics. When the date of the election is in italics, this indicates a by-election.

A member of the 2nd Parliament, for the same constituency, is indicated by an * before the MPs name. A member of the 2nd Parliament, for a different constituency in Ireland, is indicated by a + before the MPs name.

Election	Constituency	Member	Party	Notes
1806, 24 November	County Antrim; 2 members	*Edmond Alexander MacNaghten	Tory	
1806, 24 November	County Antrim; 2 members	*Hon. John O'Neill	Tory	
1806, 11 November	Armagh	*Patrick Duigenan	Tory	
1806, 17 November	County Armagh; 2 members	*Viscount Acheson	Tory	Became the 2nd Earl of Gosford
1806, 17 November	County Armagh; 2 members	*Hon. Henry Caulfeild	Whig	
1807, 13 March	County Armagh; 2 members	William Brownlow	Tory	
1806, 13 November	Athlone	George Tierney	Whig	
1806, 15 November	Bandon	Hon. Courtenay Boyle	Tory	
1806, 17 November	Belfast	*James Edward May	Tory	
1806, 13 November	Carlow	Hon. Frederick John Robinson		
1806, 13 November	County Carlow; 2 members	*David La Touche	Whig	
1806, 13 November	County Carlow; 2 members	*Walter Bagenal	Whig	
1806, 17 November	Carrickfergus	*Lord Spencer Stanley Chichester	Tory	Resigned
1807, 31 March	Carrickfergus	James Craig	Whig	
1806, 17 November	Cashel	Viscount Primrose	Whig	
1806, 17 November	County Cavan; 2 members	*Nathaniel Sneyd	Tory	Also returned for Enniskillen
1806, 17 November	County Cavan; 2 members	John Maxwell-Barry	Tory	
1806, 13 November	County Clare; 2 members	*Hon. Francis Nathaniel Burton		
1806, 13 November	County Clare; 2 members	*Sir Edward O'Brien, Bt		
1806, 20 November	Clonmel	*Rt Hon. William Bagwell	Tory	
1806, 13 November	Coleraine	+Sir George Fitzgerald Hill, Bt	Tory	Elected to sit for Londonderry
1807, 4 February	Coleraine	*Walter Jones	Tory	
1806, 14 November	Cork; 2 members	*Mountifort Longfield	Tory	
1806, 14 November	Cork; 2 members	*Hon. Christopher Hely-Hutchinson	Whig	
1806, 17 November	County Cork; 2 members	*Viscount Boyle	Whig	
1806, 17 November	County Cork; 2 members	+Hon. George Ponsonby	Whig	
1806, 17 November	County Donegal; 2 members	*Sir James Stewart, Bt	Tory	
1806, 17 November	County Donegal; 2 members	Henry Vaughan Brooke	Tory	
1806, 17 November	County Down; 2 members	*Francis Savage		
1806, 17 November	County Down; 2 members	*Hon. John Meade		
1806, 18 November	Downpatrick	Edward Southwell Ruthven	Whig	Possibly unseated on petition and John; Wilson Croker (Tory) declared duly elected
1806, 14 November	Drogheda	Henry Meade Ogle	Tory	
1806, 19 November	Dublin; 2 members	*Robert Shaw	Tory	
1806, 19 November	Dublin; 2 members	Rt Hon. Henry Grattan	Whig	
1806, 27 November	County Dublin; 2 members	*Hans Hamilton	Tory	
1806, 27 November	County Dublin; 2 members	*Frederick John Falkiner	Tory	
1806, 6 November	Dublin University	*Hon. George Knox	Tory	Also returned for Dungannon
1806, 22 November	Dundalk	John Metge	Tory	Resigned
1807, 20 January	Dundalk	Josias Porcher	Tory	
1806, 11 November	Dungannon	*Hon. George Knox	Tory	Elected to sit for Dublin University
1807, 31 January	Dungannon	Viscount Hamilton	Tory	
1806, 14 November	Dungarvan	Hon. George Walpole	Whig	
1806, 6 November	Ennis	Rt Hon. James Fitzgerald	Tory	
1806, 20 November	Enniskillen	Nathaniel Sneyd	Tory	Elected to sit for Cavan
1807, 14 January	Enniskillen	Richard Henry Alexander Bennet	Tory	
1806, 17 November	County Fermanagh; 2 members	*Mervyn Archdall (junior)	Tory	
1806, 17 November	County Fermanagh; 2 members	*Hon. Galbraith Lowry Cole	Tory	
1806, 10 November	Galway Borough	*James Daly	Tory	
1806, 17 December	County Galway; 2 members	*Richard Martin	Tory	
1806, 17 December	County Galway; 2 members	*Denis Bowes Daly	Tory	
1806, 17 November	County Kerry; 2 members	*Rt Hon. Maurice Fitzgerald (The 18th Knight of Kerry)	Whig	Also returned for Tralee
1806, 17 November	County Kerry; 2 members	Henry Arthur Herbert	Whig	
1806, 21 November	County Kildare; 2 members	*Lord Robert Stephen Fitzgerald	Whig	
1806, 21 November	County Kildare; 2 members	*Robert La Touche	Whig	
1806, 2 December	Kilkenny	*Hon. Charles Harward Butler	Whig	
1806, 21 November	County Kilkenny; 2 members	*Hon. James Butler	Whig	
1806, 21 November	County Kilkenny; 2 members	Hon. Frederick Ponsonby	Whig	
1806, 17 November	King's County; 2 members	*Sir Lawrence Parsons, Bt	Tory	
1806, 17 November	King's County; 2 members	*Thomas Bernard (senior)	Tory	
1806, 11 November	Kinsale	*Henry Martin	Whig	
1806, 21 November	County Leitrim; 2 members	*Henry John Clements	Tory	
1806, 21 November	County Leitrim; 2 members	William Gore	Tory	
1806, 10 November	Limerick	*Charles Vereker	Tory	
1806, 22 November	County Limerick; 2 members	*William Odell		Classified Tory in the 4th Parliament
1806, 22 November	County Limerick; 2 members	Hon. William Henry Quin		
1806, 20 November	Lisburn	*Earl of Yarmouth	Tory	
1806, 8 December	Londonderry	*Sir George Fitzgerald Hill, Bt	Tory	
1806, 4 December	County Londonderry; 2 members	*Hon. Charles William Stewart	Tory	
1806, 4 December	County Londonderry; 2 members	*Lord George Thomas Beresford	Tory	
1806, 25 November	County Longford; 2 members	*Sir Thomas Fetherston, Bt	Tory	
1806, 25 November	County Longford; 2 members	Viscount Forbes	Tory	
1806, 18 November	County Louth; 2 members	*Rt Hon. John Foster	Tory	
1806, 18 November	County Louth; 2 members	Viscount Jocelyn	Tory	
1806, 12 November	Mallow	*Denham Jephson	Whig	
1806, 17 November	County Mayo; 2 members	*Rt Hon. Denis Browne	Tory	^{a}
1806, 17 November	County Mayo; 2 members	*Hon. Henry Augustus Dillon	Whig	^{a}
1806, 18 November	County Meath; 2 members	*Sir Marcus Somerville, Bt	Whig	
1806, 18 November	County Meath; 2 members	*Thomas Bligh	Whig	
1806, 19 November	County Monaghan; 2 members	*Richard Dawson		
1806, 19 November	County Monaghan; 2 members	*Charles Powell Leslie II	Tory	
1806, 10 November	New Ross	Charles Leigh		
1806, 15 November	Newry	Hon. Francis Needham	Tory	
1806, 22 November	Portarlington	Sir Oswald Mosley, Bt		
1806, 12 November	Queen's County; 2 members	*Henry Brooke Parnell	Whig	
1806, 12 November	Queen's County; 2 members	*Hon. William Wellesley-Pole	Tory	Appointed Clerk of the Ordnance
1807, 13 April	Queen's County; 2 members	*Hon. William Wellesley-Pole	Tory	
1806, 17 November	County Roscommon; 2 members	*Arthur French	Whig	
1806, 17 November	County Roscommon; 2 members	Hon. Stephen Mahon	Whig	
1806, 17 November	Sligo	*George Canning	Tory	Cousin of the future Prime Minister
1806, 17 November	County Sligo; 2 members	*Charles O'Hara	Whig	
1806, 17 November	County Sligo; 2 members	Edward Synge Cooper	Tory	
1806, 17 November	County Tipperary; 2 members	Hon. Montagu James Mathew	Whig	^{b}
1806, 17 November	County Tipperary; 2 members	Hon. Francis Aldborough Prittie	Whig	
1806, 17 November	Tralee	+Rt Hon. Maurice FitzGerald (The 18th Knight of Kerry)	Whig	Elected to sit for Kerry
1807, 17 January	Tralee	Samuel Boddington	Tory	
1806, 18 November	County Tyrone; 2 members	*James Stewart		
1806, 18 November	County Tyrone; 2 members	Hon. Thomas Knox		
1806, 17 November	Waterford	*Sir John Newport, Bt	Whig	
1806, 18 November	County Waterford; 2 members	*John Claudius Beresford	Tory	
1806, 18 November	County Waterford; 2 members	Richard Power	Whig	
1806, 15 November	County Westmeath; 2 members	*William Smyth		
1806, 15 November	County Westmeath; 2 members	*Gustavus Hume-Rochfort		Classified Tory in the 5th Parliament
1806, 10 November	Wexford	Sir Robert Wigram, Bt	Tory	
1806, 17 November	County Wexford; 2 members	John Colclough	Whig	
1806, 17 November	County Wexford; 2 members	Robert Shapland Carew	Whig	
1806, 15 November	County Wicklow; 2 members	*William Hoare Hume	Whig	
1806, 15 November	County Wicklow; 2 members	*William Tighe	Whig	
1806, 10 November	Youghal	Viscount Bernard	Tory	

Supplementary notes:

- ^{a} Stooks Smith does not classify this MP by party, in this Parliament, but does in the previous and next Parliaments. It is assumed the party allegiance was the same in this Parliament.
- ^{b} Stooks Smith wrongly lists Hon. Montagu James Mathew as a member of the previous Parliament, following a by-election in 1806 caused by Viscount Mathew having succeeded as the 2nd Earl Landaff.

== See also ==
- Duration of English, British and United Kingdom parliaments from 1660
- List of parliaments of the United Kingdom
- List of United Kingdom by-elections (1806-1818)
- 1806 United Kingdom general election
