= Members of the 2nd UK Parliament from Ireland =

1st Parliament	(1801)
2nd Parliament	(1802)
3rd Parliament	(1806)

This is a list of the MPs for Irish constituencies, who were elected at the 1802 United Kingdom general election, to serve as members of the 2nd UK Parliament from Ireland, or who were elected at subsequent by-elections. There were 100 seats representing Ireland in this Parliament.

This was the first United Kingdom general election, as the House of Commons of the 1st Parliament of the United was chosen from the members of the Parliament of Great Britain and the Parliament of Ireland and not by a popular election.

The 2nd United Kingdom Parliament was elected between 5 July and 28 August 1802, as at this period the exact date for the election in each constituency was fixed by the Returning Officer. The Parliament first assembled on 31 August for a maximum duration of seven years from that date. It was dissolved on 24 October 1806 (a length of four years, one month and twenty four days).

== Summary of results by party (Ireland only) ==
The names of and votes for candidates at elections are based on Walker. Party labels are based on those used by Stooks Smith and may differ from those in other sources. Many early nineteenth century Irish MPs are not classified by party, by Stooks Smith.

In some cases, when a party label is used for the MP by Stooks Smith in a subsequent Parliament, this is noted in the Members list below.

At the dissolution of the 1st Parliament, the MPs by party (calculated as above), were

Other (unclassified) 50, Tory 34, Whig 16: Total 100.

Party	Candidates	Unopposed	Votes	%	Seats election	Seats dissolution
Tory	45	37	5,703	37.03	43	43
Whig	33	21	6,274	40.73	28	31
Other	35	25	3,425	22.24	29	26
Total	113	83	15,402	100.0	100	100

Note: Two Tory candidates contested and won two constituencies. Each candidacy is counted separately in the table.

== General election results by constituency ==
Constituency	Votes Tory	Votes Whig	Votes other		Result
County Antrim; 2 members	Unopp.	–	–	–	T gain from O ^{1}
County Antrim; 2 members	Unopp.	–	–	–	T gain from O
Armagh	Unopp.	–	–	–	T hold ^{1}
County Armagh; 2 members	Unopp.	–	–	–	T gain from O ^{1}
County Armagh; 2 members	–	Unopp.	–	–	W gain from O
Athlone	–	–	Unopp.	–	O hold ^{1}
Bandon	–	Unopp.	–	–	W hold ^{1}
Belfast	Unopp.	–	–	–	T hold ^{1}
Carlow	Unopp.	–	–	–	T hold ^{1}
County Carlow; 2 members	–	524	437	–	W gain from O
County Carlow; 2 members	–	479	426	–	W gain from O
Carrickfergus	381	270	–	–	T gain from O
Cashel	–	Unopp.	–	–	W gain from O
County Cavan; 2 members	–	Unopp.	–	–	W hold ^{1}
County Cavan; 2 members	Unopp.	–	–	–	T hold ^{1}
County Clare; 2 members	–	–	880	–	O hold ^{1}
County Clare; 2 members	–	–	535	499	O hold
Clonmel	Unopp.	–	–	–	T hold ^{1}
Coleraine	Unopp.	–	–	–	T hold ^{1}
Cork; 2 members	Unopp.	–	–	–	T hold ^{1}
Cork; 2 members	–	Unopp.	–	–	W hold ^{1}
County Cork; 2 members	–	–	Unopp.	–	O hold ^{1}
County Cork; 2 members	–	–	Unopp.	–	O hold ^{1}
County Donegal; 2 members	Unopp.	–	–	–	T hold ^{1}
County Donegal; 2 members	Unopp.	–	–	–	T hold
County Down; 2 members	Unopp.	–	–	–	T hold ^{1}
County Down; 2 members	–	–	Unopp.	–	O hold ^{1}
Downpatrick	–	–	96	87	O hold
Drogheda	–	–	213	208	O hold ^{1}
Dublin; 2 members	1,965	642	–	–	T hold ^{1}
Dublin; 2 members	1,281	1,673	–	–	W gain from T
County Dublin; 2 members	708	–	–	–	T hold ^{1}
County Dublin; 2 members	469	263	–	–	T hold ^{1}
Dublin University	39	29	–	–	T hold ^{1}
Dundalk	Unopp.	–	–	–	T hold
Dungannon	Unopp.	–	–	–	T gain from O
Dungarvan	–	Unopp.	–	–	W hold
Ennis	Unopp.	–	–	–	T hold
Enniskillen	Unopp.	–	–	–	T hold
County Fermanagh; 2 members	Unopp.	–	–	–	T hold ^{1}
County Fermanagh; 2 members	Unopp.	–	–	–	T hold
Galway Borough	Unopp.	–	–	–	T gain from W
County Galway; 2 members	–	–	Unopp.	–	O hold ^{1}
County Galway; 2 members	–	–	Unopp.	–	O hold ^{1}
County Kerry; 2 members	–	Unopp.	–	–	W hold ^{1}
County Kerry; 2 members	Unopp.	–	–	–	T hold ^{1}
County Kildare; 2 members	–	Unopp.	–	–	W gain from O
County Kildare; 2 members	–	Unopp.	–	–	W hold
Kilkenny	–	Unopp.	–	–	W gain from O
County Kilkenny; 2 members	–	Unopp.	–	–	W hold ^{1}
County Kilkenny; 2 members	–	Unopp.	–	–	W hold ^{1}
King's County; 2 members	Unopp.	–	–	–	T hold
King's County; 2 members	–	–	Unopp.	–	O hold ^{1}
Kinsale	–	–	Unopp.	–	O hold
County Leitrim; 2 members	–	779	–	–	W hold ^{1}
County Leitrim; 2 members	389	668	–	–	W gain from T
Limerick	Unopp.	–	–	–	T gain from O
County Limerick; 2 members	–	–	Unopp.	–	O hold ^{1}
County Limerick; 2 members	–	–	Unopp.	–	O hold
Lisburn	Unopp.	–	–	–	T hold
Londonderry	Unopp.	–	–	–	T gain from O
County Londonderry; 2 members	Unopp	–	–	–	T hold ^{1}
County Londonderry; 2 members	Unopp.	–	–	–	T hold
County Longford; 2 members	–	–	Unopp.	–	O hold ^{1}
County Longford; 2 members	–	–	Unopp.	–	O hold
County Louth; 2 members	–	–	Unopp.	–	O hold ^{1}
County Louth; 2 members	–	–	Unopp.	–	O hold ^{1}
Mallow	–	Unopp.	–	–	W gain from O
County Mayo; 2 members	Unopp.	–	–	–	T gain from O ^{1}
County Mayo; 2 members	–	Unopp.	–	–	W gain from O
County Meath; 2 members	–	326	–	–	W gain from O ^{1}
County Meath; 2 members	–	181	44	–	W gain from O
County Monaghan; 2 members	–	–	Unopp.	–	O hold ^{1}
County Monaghan; 2 members	Unopp.	–	–	–	T hold ^{1}
New Ross	–	–	Unopp.	–	O hold
Newry	–	Unopp.	–	–	W gain from O
Portarlington	–	–	Unopp.	–	O hold
Queen's County; 2 members	–	–	Unopp.	–	O hold ^{1}
Queen's County; 2 members	–	–	Unopp.	–	O hold
County Roscommon; 2 members	–	Unopp.	–	–	W hold ^{1}
County Roscommon; 2 members	–	Unopp.	–	–	W hold
Sligo	Unopp.	–	–	–	T hold ^{1}
County Sligo; 2 members	Unopp.	–	–	–	T hold ^{1}
County Sligo; 2 members	–	Unopp.	–	–	W hold ^{1}
County Tipperary; 2 members	–	–	Unopp.	–	O hold ^{1}
County Tipperary; 2 members	–	–	Unopp.	–	O hold ^{1}
Tralee	Unopp.	–	–	–	T gain from O
County Tyrone; 2 members	–	–	Unopp.	–	O hold ^{1}
County Tyrone; 2 members	–	–	Unopp.	–	O hold ^{1}
Waterford	471	440	–	–	T hold ^{1}
County Waterford; 2 members	Unopp.	–	–	–	T hold ^{1}
County Waterford; 2 members	–	Unopp.	–	–	W hold
County Westmeath; 2 members	–	–	Unopp.	–	O hold ^{1}
County Westmeath; 2 members	–	–	Unopp.	–	O hold ^{1}
Wexford	Unopp.	–	–	–	T gain from O
County Wexford; 2 members	Unopp.	–	–	–	T hold ^{1}
County Wexford; 2 members	Unopp.	–	–	–	T hold
County Wicklow; 2 members	–	Unopp	–	–	W hold ^{1}
County Wicklow; 2 members	–	Unopp.	–	–	W hold ^{1}
Youghal	Unopp.	–	–	–	T hold ^{1}
Constituency	Votes Tory	Votes Whig	Votes other		Result

Note:

- ^{1} Incumbent re-elected

== Members by constituency ==
The list is given in alphabetical order by constituency. The County prefixes used for county constituencies is disregarded in determining alphabetical order, but the county follows any borough or city constituency with the same name.

The name of an MP who served during the Parliament, but who was not the holder of a seat at the dissolution in 1806, is given in italics. When the date of the election is in italics, this indicates a by-election.

A member of the 1st Parliament, for the same constituency, is indicated by an * before the MPs name. A member of the 1st Parliament, for a different constituency in Ireland, is indicated by a + before the MPs name.

Election	Constituency	Member	Party	Notes
1802, 19 July	County Antrim; 2 members	*Edmond Alexander MacNaghten	Tory	
1802, 19 July	County Antrim; 2 members	Hon. John O'Neill	Tory	
1802, 9 July	Armagh	*Patrick Duigenan	Tory	
1802, 17 July	County Armagh; 2 members	*Hon. Archibald Acheson (Viscount Acheson)	Tory	Styled Viscount Acheson from February 1806
1802, 17 July	County Armagh; 2 members	Hon. Henry Caulfeild	Whig	
1802, 26 July	Athlone	*William Handcock		Resigned
1803, 22 August	Athlone	Thomas Tyrwitt Jones		
1802, 13 July	Bandon	*Sir Broderick Chinnery, Bt	Whig	
1802, 12 July	Belfast	*James Edward May	Tory	
1802, 24 July	Carlow	*Charles Montague Ormsby	Tory	Appointed Recorder of Prince of Wales Island (Penang)
1806, 9 June	Carlow	Michael Symes		
1802, 26 July	County Carlow; 2 members	David La Touche	Whig	
1802, 26 July	County Carlow; 2 members	Walter Bagenal	Whig	
1802, 30 July	Carrickfergus	Lord Spencer Stanley Chichester	Tory	
1802, 27 July	Cashel	Rt Hon. William Wickham	Whig	Appointed a Commissioner of the Treasury
1806, 27 February	Cashel	Rt Hon. William Wickham	Whig	
1802, 16 July	County Cavan; 2 members	*Francis Saunderson	Whig	Possibly Tory (see constituency article)
1802, 16 July	County Cavan; 2 members	*Nathaniel Sneyd	Tory	
1802, 24 July	County Clare; 2 members	*Hon. Francis Nathaniel Burton		
1802, 24 July	County Clare; 2 members	Sir Edward O'Brien, Bt		
1802, 19 July	Clonmel	*Rt Hon. William Bagwell	Tory	
1802, 26 July	Coleraine	*Walter Jones	Tory	
1802, 16 July	Cork; 2 members	*Mountifort Longfield	Tory	
1802, 16 July	Cork; 2 members	*Hon. Christopher Hely-Hutchinson	Whig	
1802, 15 July	County Cork; 2 members	*Viscount Boyle		Classified Whig in the 3rd Parliament
1802, 15 July	County Cork; 2 members	*Robert Uniacke Fitzgerald		
1802, 28 July	County Donegal; 2 members	*Viscount Sudley	Tory	
1802, 28 July	County Donegal; 2 members	Sir James Stewart, Bt	Tory	
1802, 24 July	County Down; 2 members	*Viscount Castlereagh	Tory	Appointed Secretary of State for War and the Colonies
1802, 24 July	County Down; 2 members	*Francis Savage		
1805, 27 July	County Down; 2 members	Hon. John Meade		
1802, 17 July	Downpatrick	Charles Stewart Hawthorne		
1802, 27 July	Drogheda	*Edward Hardman		
1802, 21 July	Dublin; 2 members	*John Claudius Beresford	Tory	Resigned
1802, 21 July	Dublin; 2 members	John La Touche	Whig	
1804, 31 March	Dublin; 2 members	Robert Shaw	Tory	
1802, 14 July	County Dublin; 2 members	*Hans Hamilton	Tory	
1802, 14 July	County Dublin; 2 members	*Frederick John Falkiner	Tory	
1802, 14 July	Dublin University	*Hon. George Knox	Tory	Also returned for Dungannon. Appointed a Commissioner of the Treasury in Ireland
1805, 28 March	Dublin University	*Hon. George Knox	Tory	
1802, 15 July	Dundalk	Richard Archdall	Tory	
1802, 12 July	Dungannon	+Hon. George Knox	Tory	Elects to sit for Dublin University
1803, 9 June	Dungannon	*Sir Charles Hamilton, Bt	Tory	
1802, 17 July	Dungarvan	William Greene	Whig	
1802, 22 July	Ennis	Rt Hon. James Fitzgerald	Tory	
1802, 31 July	Enniskillen	+Rt Hon. John Beresford	Tory	Elects to sit for County Waterford
1802, 24 December	Enniskillen	William Burroughs	Tory	Appointed a Judge of the Supreme Court in Bengal
1806, 14 March	Enniskillen	John King	Tory	Resigned
1806, 3 July	Enniskillen	William Henry Fremantle	Tory	
1802, 19 July	County Fermanagh; 2 members	*Viscount Cole	Tory	Cole becomes the 2nd Earl of Enniskillen
1802, 19 July	County Fermanagh; 2 members	Mervyn Archdall (junior)	Tory	
1803, 27 June	County Fermanagh; 2 members	Hon. Galbraith Lowry Cole	Tory	
1802, 15 July	Galway Borough	+Denis Bowes Daly	Tory	Resigned to contest County Galway
1805, 29 June	Galway Borough	James Daly	Tory	
1802, 22 July	County Galway; 2 members	*Richard Martin		
1802, 22 July	County Galway; 2 members	*Hon. Richard Le Poer Trench (Viscount Dunlo)		Styled Viscount Dunlo from January 1803; Appointed Commissioner for the Affairs of India
1804, 4 June	County Galway; 2 members	*Hon. Richard Le Poer Trench (Viscount Dunlo)		Dunlo became the 2nd Earl of Clancarty
1805, 8 June	County Galway; 2 members	+Denis Bowes Daly	Tory	Appointed Joint Mustermaster General in Ireland
1806, 10 May	County Galway; 2 members	+Denis Bowes Daly	Tory	
1802, 26 July	County Kerry; 2 members	*Rt Hon. Maurice Fitzgerald (The 18th Knight of Kerry)	Whig	
1802, 26 July	County Kerry; 2 members	*James Crosbie	Tory	
1802, 20 July	County Kildare; 2 members	Lord Robert Stephen Fitzgerald	Whig	
1802, 20 July	County Kildare; 2 members	Robert La Touche	Whig	
1802, 22 July	Kilkenny	Hon. Charles Harward Butler	Whig	
1802, 19 July	County Kilkenny; 2 members	*Hon. James Wandesford Butler	Whig	
1802, 19 July	County Kilkenny; 2 members	*Rt Hon. William Ponsonby	Whig	Created the 1st Baron Ponsonby
1806, 12 April	County Kilkenny; 2 members	Hon. George Ponsonby	Whig	
1802, 22 July	King's County; 2 members	Thomas Bernard (senior)	Tory	
1802, 22 July	King's County; 2 members	*Sir Lawrence Parsons, Bt		Appointed a Commissioner of the Treasury in Ireland
1805, 6 April	King's County; 2 members	*Sir Lawrence Parsons, Bt	Tory	
1802, 13 July	Kinsale	+Samuel Campbell Rowley		Resigned
1806, 29 April	Kinsale	Henry Martin	Whig	
1802, 24 July	County Leitrim; 2 members	*Viscount Clements	Whig	Became the 2nd Earl of Leitrim
1802, 24 July	County Leitrim; 2 members	Peter La Touche	Whig	
1805, 5 February	County Leitrim; 2 members	Henry John Clements	Tory	
1802, 16 July	Limerick	Charles Vereker	Tory	
1802, 22 July	County Limerick; 2 members	*William Odell		Classified Tory in the 4th Parliament
1802, 22 July	County Limerick; 2 members	Charles Silver Oliver		
1802, 12 July	Lisburn	Earl of Yarmouth	Tory	
1802, 21 July	Londonderry	+Sir George Fitzgerald Hill, Bt	Tory	
1802, 21 July	County Londonderry; 2 members	*Hon. Charles William Stewart	Tory	
1802, 21 July	County Londonderry; 2 members	Lord George Thomas Beresford	Tory	
1802, 16 July	County Longford; 2 members	*Sir Thomas Fetherston, Bt		Classified Tory in the 3rd Parliament
1802, 16 July	County Longford; 2 members	Hon. Thomas Gleadowe-Newcomen		
1802, 22 July	County Louth; 2 members	*William Charles Fortescue		
1802, 22 July	County Louth; 2 members	*Rt Hon. John Foster		Appointed Chancellor and Under-Treasurer of the Exchequer in Ireland
1804, 6 August	County Louth; 2 members	*Rt Hon. John Foster	Tory	
1802, 13 July	Mallow	Denham Jephson	Whig	
1802, 22 July	County Mayo; 2 members	*Rt Hon. Denis Browne	Tory	
1802, 22 July	County Mayo; 2 members	Hon. Henry Augustus Dillon	Whig	
1802, 23 July	County Meath; 2 members	*Sir Marcus Somerville, Bt	Whig	
1802, 23 July	County Meath; 2 members	Thomas Bligh	Whig	
1802, 23 July	County Monaghan; 2 members	*Richard Dawson		
1802, 23 July	County Monaghan; 2 members	*Charles Powell Leslie II	Tory	
1802, 10 July	New Ross	Charles Tottenham		Resigned
1805, 26 July	New Ross	Ponsonby Tottenham		
1802, 13 July	Newry	+Rt Hon. Isaac Corry	Whig	
1802, 17 July	Portarlington	+Henry Brooke Parnell		Resigned
1802, 30 December	Portarlington	Thomas Tyrwhitt		Resigned
1806, 15 March	Portarlington	John Langston		
1802, 23 July	Queen's County; 2 members	*Hon. William Wellesley-Pole		
1802, 23 July	Queen's County; 2 members	Sir Eyre Coote		Appointed Lieutenant Governor of Jamaica
1806, 17 February	Queen's County; 2 members	*Henry Brooke Parnell		Appointed a Commissioner of the Treasury in Ireland
1806, 18 April	Queen's County; 2 members	*Henry Brooke Parnell	Whig	
1802, 22 July	County Roscommon; 2 members	*Arthur French	Whig	
1802, 22 July	County Roscommon; 2 members	Hon. Edward King	Whig	
1802, 24 July	Sligo	*Owen Wynne	Tory	Resigned
1806, 16 July	Sligo	George Canning	Tory	Cousin of the MP for Tralee
1802, 23 July	County Sligo; 2 members	*Joshua Edward Cooper	Tory	
1802, 23 July	County Sligo; 2 members	*Charles O'Hara	Whig	Appointed a Commissioner of the Treasury in Ireland
1806, 17 April	County Sligo; 2 members	*Charles O'Hara	Whig	
1802, 19 July	County Tipperary; 2 members	*Viscount Mathew		^{a}
1802, 19 July	County Tipperary; 2 members	*John Bagwell (c. 1752-1816)		
1802, 24 July	Tralee	Rt Hon. George Canning	Tory	Appointed Treasurer of the Navy
1804, 4 June	Tralee	Rt Hon. George Canning	Tory	Cousin of the MP for Sligo
1802, 19 July	County Tyrone; 2 members	*James Stewart		
1802, 19 July	County Tyrone; 2 members	*Rt Hon. John Stewart		
1802, 24 July	Waterford	*William Congreve Alcock	Tory	Unseated on petition
1803, 7 December	Waterford	Sir John Newport, Bt	Whig	Declared duly elected on petition. Appointed; Chancellor of the Exchequer in Ireland
1806, 14 March	Waterford	Sir John Newport, Bt	Whig	
1802, 21 July	County Waterford; 2 members	*Rt Hon. John Beresford	Tory	Also returned for Enniskillen. Died.
1802, 21 July	County Waterford; 2 members	+Edward Lee	Whig	
1806, 6 January	County Waterford; 2 members	+John Claudius Beresford	Tory	
1802, 16 July	County Westmeath; 2 members	*William Smyth		
1802, 16 July	County Westmeath; 2 members	*Gustavus Hume-Rochfort		Classified Tory in the 5th Parliament
1802, 9 July	Wexford	Richard Nevill	Tory	
1802, 19 July	County Wexford; 2 members	*Viscount Loftus	Tory	Became the 2nd Marquess of Ely
1802, 19 July	County Wexford; 2 members	*Abel Ram	Tory	
1806, 27 May	County Wexford; 2 members	Caesar Colclough	Whig	
1802, 22 July	County Wicklow; 2 members	*William Hoare Hume	Whig	
1802, 22 July	County Wicklow; 2 members	*George Ponsonby	Whig	Appointed Lord Chancellor of Ireland
1806, 10 May	County Wicklow; 2 members	William Tighe	Whig	
1802, 13 July	Youghal	*Sir John Keane, Bt	Tory	

Supplemental note:

- ^{a} Stooks Smith (vol. III p. 240) states that there was a by-election in 1806, with Hon. Montagu James Mathew (Whig) elected in place of Viscount Mathew who had succeeded as the 2nd Earl Landaff in July. However Stooks Smith is in error: the Return of Members of Parliament (Part II p. 229) shows that no further election was held in the constituency. The History of Parliament 1790–1820 vol. II p. 685 explains that preparations for a county by-election were made in which the new Earl of Llandaff hoped to be succeeded by his brother Montague but was restricted by a Government pledge to support Hon Francis Prittie. When the by-election was overtaken by a dissolution, the Mathew family managed to get both elected by deposing John Bagwell.

== See also ==
- Duration of English, British and United Kingdom parliaments from 1660
- List of parliaments of the United Kingdom
- List of United Kingdom by-elections (1801–1806)
- 1802 United Kingdom general election
