= Somerset Maxwell =

Somerset Maxwell may refer to:

- Somerset Maxwell, 8th Baron Farnham (1803–1884), MP for Cavan
- Somerset Maxwell, 10th Baron Farnham (1849–1900), Irish Representative peer
- Somerset Arthur Maxwell (1905–1942), MP for King's Lynn
