= Henry Maxwell, 6th Baron Farnham =

Irish peer and Church of Ireland clergyman

The Reverend Henry Maxwell, 6th Baron Farnham (1774 – 19 October 1838) was an Irish peer and Church of Ireland clergyman who reputedly used his prerogatives as landlord to induce his distressed tenants to abandon their Catholic faith and take the Anglican communion.

He was the son of Henry Maxwell, Bishop of Meath, and grandson of John Maxwell, 1st Baron Farnham. On his brother's death, he succeeded as 6th Baron Farnham on 20 September 1838, holding the title for just under a month before his own death.

He married on 8 September 1798 to Lady Anne Butler (d. 29 May 1831), daughter of Henry Thomas Butler, 2nd Earl of Carrick. They had the following issue:

1. Henry Maxwell, 7th Baron Farnham (b. 9 August 1799 - d. 20 August 1868).
2. Sarah Juliana (b. 14 December 1801, died 17 December 1870); she married on 18 March 1828 to Alexander Saunderson (1783–1857) who was MP for County Cavan 1826–1831. Their son Edward James Saunderson was also MP for Cavan 1865–1874 and later became MP for North Armagh 1885–1906.
3. Somerset Richard Maxwell, 8th Baron Farnham (b. 18 October 1803 - d. 4 June 1884).
4. Harriet Margaret Maxwell (b. 11 February 1805 – d. 4 July 1880); she married firstly on 14 February 1826 to Edward Southwell Ward, 3rd Viscount Bangor (1790–1837); and married secondly on 4 October 1841 to Major Andrew Nugent.
5. John Barry, born 16 May 1807.
6. Anne, born 26 May 1809.
7. Edward William, born November 1812.
8. James Pierce Maxwell, 9th Baron Farnham (b. 1813 - d. 26 October 1896).
9. Richard Thomas Maxwell (b. 19 February 1815 – d. 22 January 1874); he married on 7 March 1848 to Charlotte Anne Elrington (d.1 March 1910), daughter of Henry Preston Elrington. Their son, Somerset Henry Maxwell, became 10th Baron Farnham.
10. Robert Thomas, born November 1817.
11. William George, born 1821

In 1827, the liberal lawyer George Ensor was asked James Warren Doyle, the Roman Catholic Bishop of Kildare and Leighlin, to investigate Farnham's claims of hundreds of conversions to Protestantism on his estate. Ensor's reports assured the bishop that, such as they were, the conversions were a case of "souperism" and would not survive the near-famine conditions in the area.

Farnham was succeeded by his eldest son Henry, who, in the Great Famine, was similarly accused of withholding assistance and relief from tenants who refused to abjure their Catholic faith.

Peerage of Ireland
| Preceded by John Maxwell-Barry | Baron Farnham; Oct–Nov 1838 | Succeeded by Henry Maxwell |
