= High Sheriff of Cavan =

The High Sheriff of Cavan was the British Crown's judicial representative in County Cavan, Ireland from the 16th century until 1922, when the office was abolished in the new Free State and replaced by the office of Cavan County Sheriff. The sheriff had judicial, electoral, ceremonial and administrative functions and executed High Court Writs. In 1908, an Order in Council made the Lord-Lieutenant the Sovereign's prime representative in a county and reduced the High Sheriff's precedence. However the sheriff retained his responsibilities for the preservation of law and order in the county. The usual procedure for appointing the sheriff from 1660 onwards was that three persons were nominated at the beginning of each year from the county and the Lord Lieutenant then appointed one of the nominees as his choice of High Sheriff for the remainder of the year. Often the other nominees were appointed as under-sheriffs. Sometimes a sheriff did not fulfil his entire term through death or other event and another sheriff was then appointed for the remainder of the year. The dates given hereunder are the dates of appointment. All addresses are in County Cavan unless stated otherwise.

== Elizabeth I, 1558–1603 ==
- 1581: Eamon O'Reilly of Kilnacrott (later Lord of Bréifne O'Reilly 1596–1601)
- 1584: Sir Henry Duke
- 1585: Sir Henry Duke
- 1586: Sir Henry Duke
- 1587: Sir Henry Duke
- 1588: Sir Henry Duke
- 1589: Sir Edward Herbert
- 1590: Sir Edward Herbert
- 1591: Sir Edward Herbert
- 1592: Sir Edward Herbert
- 1593: Sir Edward Herbert
- 1594: Sir Edward Herbert
- 1595: Sir Edward Herbert
- 1596: Sir Edward Herbert
- 1597: Sir Edward Herbert
- 1598: Sir Edward Herbert
- 1599: Sir Edward Herbert
- 1600: Sir Edward Herbert
- 1601: Sir Edward Herbert
- 1602: Sir Edward Herbert
- 1603: Sir Edward Herbert

== James I, 1603–1625 ==
- 1604: Sir Edward Herbert
- 1605: Sir Edward Herbert
- 1606: Sir Edward Herbert
- 1607: Hugh Culme
- 1608: Sir Edward Herbert
- 1609: Sir Edward Herbert
- 1610: Sir Edward Herbert
- 1611: Hugh Culme
- 1612: Hugh Culme
- 1613: John Ridgeway
- 1614: John Butler
- 1615: James Craig
- 1616: John Fish
- 1617: Nicholas Lisle
- 1618: Hugh Culme
- 1619: Richard Lisle
- 1620: Robert Scurlock
- 1621: Robert Scurlock
- 1622: Sir Stephen Butler of Belturbet

== Charles I, 1625–1649 ==
- 1629: Philip O'Reilly
- 1630: Thomas Fleming
- 1634: John Fleming
- 1635: Thomas Fleming
- 1636: James Fleming of Ballyneagh
- 1638: Edward Gray
- 1639: William Lill
- 1640: Francis Lawrence Devall
- 1641: Myles (Mulmory) O'Reilly of Kevit Castle, Kilmore
- 1641: James Talbot of Ballyconnell Castle, Ballyconnell
- (When the 1641 Rebellion broke out in Ireland in October 1641, the English government terminated Myles O'Reilly's reign as sheriff due to his involvement as one of the Irish Rebel leaders, but he continued in the role in those parts of Cavan which were under native Irish rule until the surrender of the Cavan rebels on 27 April 1653. James Talbot was appointed in October 1641 as the new High Sheriff by the Dublin Lord Justices but soon left Cavan in fear for his life so in effect there were two opposing High Sheriffs of Cavan for the period of the Rebellion. Before the Rebellion, Cavan High Sheriffs were mostly Catholics but after the Rebellion they were almost all Protestant landlords)
- 2 May 1642 The Dublin Government appointed Edward Philpott

== Commonwealth, 1649–1660 ==
- Dec 1655: Charles Coote
- 12 Nov 1656: Robert Saunderson of Castle Saunderson, Belturbet
- 1 Dec 1658: Edward Philpott

== Charles II, 1660–1685 ==
- 1660: Humphrey Perrott of Drumhone
- 1661: Humphrey Perrott of Drumhone
- 1662: Thomas White of Redhills
- 26 Feb 1663: Richard Blayney
- 28 Nov 1663: Samuel Townley
- 31 Dec 1664: Thomas Couch
- 1666: Edward Philpott
- 1667: Robert Saunderson of Castle Saunderson, Belturbet
- 1668: Ambrose Bedell of Carn, Kildallan
- 4 Dec 1668: Thomas Gwyllym of Ballyconnell Castle, Ballyconnell
- 24 Nov 1669: Hugh Culme
- 1671: Abraham Clements of Rathkenny
- 22 Dec 1671: Richard Lewis of Lismore
- 12 Dec 1672: Nicholas Kempston of Dunmurray
- 22 Jan 1674: Daniel Clements of Rathkenny
- 17 Dec 1674: John Maxwell
- 9 Dec 1675: Thomas Newburgh
- 21 Dec 1676: Matthew French of Belturbet
- 22 Nov 1677: John Coyne
- 9 Jan 1679: James Sanderson
- 4 Dec 1679: Henry Palmer of Ballymagauran
- 13 Jan 1681: Humphrey Perrott of Castle Bagshaw
- 12 Dec 1681: William Lowther
- 11 Dec 1682: Fergus Farrell
- 25 Jan 1684: Robert Casey
- 6 Dec 1684: Thomas Couch

== James II, 1685–1688 ==
- (When King James II was crowned he began to appoint Cavan Catholics as High Sheriff but this ceased with his defeat by King William III, who then recommenced the appointment of Protestant landlords)
- 28 Jan 1686: Samuel Townley of Drumrooske
- 17 Feb 1687: Lucas Reilly
- 10 Nov 1687: Edward Reilly
- 16 Nov 1688: Luke Reilly (until William III took power and appointed Henry Gwyllym of Ballyconnell sheriff)

== William and Mary, 1689–1694 ==
- 7 Aug 1690: Daniel French of Belturbet
- 10 Dec 1690: Francis White of Redhills
- 1691: Francis White of Redhills
- 1693: Arnold Cosby of Lismore
- 7 Dec 1693: Robert Clements of Rathkenny
- 20 Dec 1694: Thomas Coote

== William III, 1694–1702 ==
- 24 Dec 1695: James Kennedy
- 3 Dec 1696: Thomas Townley of Thomascourt, Drumrooske
- 12 Dec 1697: Charles Hampson of Aghacreevy
- 3 Feb 1699: William Blachford of Lisanover, Templeport
- 25 Nov 1699: John Kempson
- 22 Nov 1700: Edward Cosby of Skea
- 4 Dec 1701: Henry Joseph Pratt

== Anne, 1702–1714 ==
- 21 Nov 1702: Brinsley Butler
- 26 Nov 1703: Thomas Fleming Junior of Belville, Crossdoney
- 14 Dec 1704: Brockhill Newburgh of Ballyhaise
- 23 Nov 1705: William Fitzherbert
- 12 Nov 1706: Charles Townley
- 14 Nov 1707: Charles Mortimer of Lislin
- 25 Nov 1708: William Nesbitt
- 24 Nov 1709: Henry Grattan
- 3 Dec 1710: Edward Cosby
- 27 Dec 1711: Thomas White
- 16 Dec 1712: William Fitzherbert
- 1714: Alexander Saunderson

== George I, 1714–1727 ==
- 1715: Charles Hampson
- 19 Jan 1716: Samuel Madden
- 2 Dec 1716: James Moore
- 1718: Arnold Cosby of Lismore
- 1719: Henry Newburgh
- 7 Dec 1719: Charles Coote of Coote Hill
- Nov 1720: Thomas Nesbitt of Lismore
- 16 Dec 1720: Charles Betty of Farranseer
- 11 Dec 1721: Mervyn Pratt of Cabra Castle, Kingscourt
- 24 Jan 1723: Arthur Galbraith
- 29 Nov 1723: William Berry
- 15 Nov 1724: Charles Coote
- 10 Dec 1725: Theophilus Clements of Rathkenny
- 14 Dec 1726: Humphrey Butler of Belturbet

== George II, 1727–1760 ==
- 24 Jan 1728: Thomas Burrowes of Stradone
- 14 Dec 1728: John Stephens of Ballinacargy
- 21 Jan 1730: John Jones Junior of Belturbet
- 15 Dec 1730: Nathaniel Clements
- 6 Jan 1732: James Saunderson of Drumcassidy, Cloverhill
- 20 Dec 1732: Thomas Davenport of Cullintragh
- 27 Jan 1733: Brockhill Perrott of Castle Bagshaw
- 31 Jan 1734: John Stanford of Carn, Kildallan
- 14 Feb 1735: Balthazar John Cramer
- 19 Feb 1736: Benjamin Copeland
- 21 Jan 1737: Galbraith Holmes
- 7 Mar 1738: John Enery of Bawnboy House
- 12 Jan 1739: John Maxwell of Farnham, Cavan
- 5 Mar 1740: Francis Saunderson
- 3 Feb 1741: Francis White of Redhills
- 4 Feb 1742: Thomas Newburgh of Ballyhaise
- 9 Mar 1743: Thomas Burrowes of Stradone House, Stradone
- 23 Feb 1744: Samuel Moore
- 15 Feb 1745: Simon Davenport of Cullintragh
- 13 Mar 1746: Josiah Veaitch of Drumurry
- 1 Feb 1747: Arthur Ellis of Ballyheady
- 4 Mar 1748: William Newburgh of Drumcarne
- 22 Jan 1749: William Stewart of Bailieborough
- 3 Mar 1750: Martin Armstrong of Carrickmakeegan, Drumreilly, County Leitrim
- 12 Jan 1751: Joseph Tuite of Orange-Brooke
- 24 Dec 1751: George Montgomery (MP) of Ballyconnell House, Ballyconnell
- 3 Feb 1753: Nicholas Coyne of Clonoose
- 22 Feb 1754: James Moore of Tullyvin
- 15 Dec 1754: Brinsley Butler
- 19 Feb 1756: John Cramer of Belturbet
- 29 Jan 1757: Robert Maxwell of Farnham
- 28 Jan 1758: Alexander Saunderson of Castle Saunderson, Belturbet
- 9 Feb 1759: John Enery of Bawnboy House, Bawnboy
- 7 Feb 1760: Charles Coote of Cootehill

== George III, 1760–1820 ==
- 19 Feb 1761: Archibald Acheson, 1st Viscount Gosford of Market Hill, County Armagh
- 29 Jan 1762: Robert Nugent of Bobsgrove, Mountnugent
- 24 Feb 1763: David Jones of Belturbet
- 10 Feb 1764: Cosby Nesbitt of Lismore
- 8 Mar 1765: Thomas Cosby of Bailieborough
- 3 Mar 1766: Henry Theophilus Clements of Ashfield Lodge, Rathkenny, Cootehill
- 26 Feb 1767: James Young of Lahard
- 12 Feb 1768: Bedell Stanford of Carn, Kildallan
- 31 Dec 1768: Thomas Nesbitt of Lismore
- 15 Feb 1770: James Fleming of Belville, Crossdoney
- 28 Dec 1770: Thomas Fleming of Cavan
- 28 Jan 1772: Gore Ellis of Ballyheady
- 5 Feb 1773: Robert Burrowes of Stradone House, Stradone
- 17 Feb 1774: Wiliam Stanford of Bilberry Hill, Kildallan
- 21 Jun 1774: Henry Theophilus Clements of Ashfield
- 17 Feb 1775: Alexander Saunderson of Drumcassidy, Cloverhill
- 6 Feb 1776: John Baker of Ashgrove
- 2 Feb 1777: Humphrey Nixon of Nixon Lodge, Belturbet
- 18 Feb 1778: John Hassard of Ennismore
- 1779: William Perrott Newburgh of Ballyhaise
- 12 Feb 1780: William Moore of Tullyvin
- 4 Feb 1781: Francis Saunderson of Castle Saunderson, Belturbet
- 21 Feb 1782: James Pratt
- 9 Feb 1783: Richard Adams of Shercock House, Shercock
- 19 Feb 1784: Francis Whyte of Redhills
- 25 Feb 1785: John Moutray Jones of Belturbet
- 20 Feb 1786: Robert Sanderson of Drumkeen
- 20 Feb 1787: Anthony O'Reilly of Baltrasna, County Meath
- 23 Feb 1788: Oliver Nugent of Bobsgrove, Mountnugent
- 19 Feb 1789: John Stanford of Carn, Kildallan
- 18 Feb 1790: Stewart Adams of Annally
- 9 Feb 1791: Sir Robert Hodson, 1st Baronet of Skea
- 27 Feb 1792: Broghill Newburgh of Ballyhaise
- 18 Feb 1793: William Henry Stephens of Ballinacargy
- 9 Feb 1794: Thomas Fleming of Castle Cosby
- 9 Jan 1795: Nathaniel Sneyd of Ballyconnell
- 18 Feb 1796: John Enery, Junior of Bawnboy
- 10 Mar 1797: Christopher Bredin of Rice Hill
- 5 Mar 1798: Cosby Nesbitt of Lismore
- 22 Feb 1799: Joseph Pratt of Cabra Castle, Kingscourt
- 14 Mar 1800: James Saunderson of Drumcassidy, Cloverhill
- 16 Feb 1801: Robert Kellett of Glebe, Waterstown, Moynalty, County Meath
- 27 Feb 1802: John Baker of Ashgrove
- 22 Feb 1803: Thomas Burrowes of Stradone House
- 23 Feb 1804: James O'Reilly of Baltrasna, County Meath
- 5 Feb 1805: Samuel Moore
- 14 Feb 1806: Andrew Bell of Drum Hill
- 11 Feb 1807: John Bell of Bellsgrove, Aghnacreevy
- 24 April 1807: Charles Coote of Bellamont Forest, Cootehill
- 28 Feb 1808: Robert Saunderson of Drumkeen
- 17 Feb 1809: Luke Magrath of Lakeville House, Gartinardress townland, Killeshandra
- 5 Feb 1810: James Adams of Drum Lodge
- 11 Feb 1811: John Adams of Shinan, Shercock
- 12 Feb 1812: Perrott Thornton of Greenville, Kildallan
- 20 Feb 1813: Henry Gore Sankey of Fort Frederick, Virginia
- 12 Feb 1814: Henry John Clements of Ashfield Lodge
- 20 Feb 1815: Richard Brady Blackwood of Clonervy
- 20 Feb 1816: Cosby Young of Lahard, Killeshandra
- 4 Feb 1817: Robert Henry Southwell of Castle Hamilton
- 19 Feb 1818: Alexander Saunderson of Castle Saunderson, Belturbet
- 1819: Sneyd Sankey of Fort Frederick, Virginia

== George IV, 1820–1830 ==
- 12 Feb 1820: William Young of Bailieborough Castle, Bailieborough
- 15 Feb 1821: Christopher Edmund Nugent of Bobsgrove, Mountnugent
- 6 Feb 1822: William Humphreys of Ballyhaise
- 4 Mar 1823: James Hamilton Storey of Ballyconnell House, Ballyconnell
- 6 Mar 1824: John Hassard of Bawnboy
- 7 Feb 1825: Bedell Stanford of Carn Cottage, Kildallan
- 8 Feb 1826: Ralph Bell Clarke of Drumkeel, Cavan
- 15 Feb 1827: Maxwell James Boyle of Tullyvin House, Cootehill
- Feb 1828: Andrew Bell of Lossett, Cavan
- 3 Mar 1829: Theophilus Lucas Clements of Rathkenny, Cootehill
- 23 Feb 1830: Charles Car Morton of Kilnarook (Grandson of Doctor Charles Morton of The British Museum)

== William IV, 1830–1837 ==
- 8 Feb 1831: George Marshall Knipe of Erne Hill, Belturbet
- 17 Feb 1832: William Humphreys, Junior of Ballyhaise Castle
- 20 Jan 1833: Charles James Adams of Shinan House, Shercock
- 13 Feb 1834: William Rathborne of Kilcogy
- 1 Feb 1835: John Finlay of Brackley Lodge, Bawnboy
- 12 Feb 1836: Sir Thomas Finlay of Bawnboy House, Bawnboy
- 11 Feb 1837: Gerald Dease of Castlepollard, County Westmeath

== Victoria, 1837–1901 ==
- 3 Mar 1838: Robert Burrowes of Stradone House, Stradone
- 1 Feb 1839: Sir George Frederick John Hodson, 3rd Baronet of Hollybrook, Bray, County Wicklow
- 14 Feb 1840: John Nesbitt of Lismore Lodge, Crossdoney
- 7 Feb 1841: Mervyn Pratt of Cabra Castle, Kingscourt
- 11 Feb 1842: Robert Saunderson of Castle Saunderson, Belturbet
- 1 Feb 1843: William Hamilton Enery of Ballyconnell House, Ballyconnell
- 7 Feb 1844: Somerset Maxwell, 8th Baron Farnham of Arley Cottage, Mountnugent
- 31 Jan 1845: Anthony O'Reilly of Baltrasna, County Meath
- 3 Feb 1846: Thomas Taylour, 3rd Marquess of Headfort of Headford House, Kells, County Meath
- 30 Jan 1847: James Hamilton of Castle Hamilton, Killeshandra
- 8 Feb 1848: Richard Fox of White Park, Killeshandra
- 26 Jan 1849: Henry Theophilus Clements of Ashfield Lodge, Cootehill
- 1 Feb 1850: Henry Cavendish Butler of Lanesborough Lodge, Belturbet
- 4 Feb 1851: Henry Bevan Slator of White Hill, Edgeworthstown, County Longford
- 30 Jan 1852: Samuel Winter of Agher House, Summerhill, County Meath
- 28 Jan 1853: Joseph Storey of Bingfield
- 28 Jan 1854: John Harvey Adams of Northlands, Kingscourt
- 13 Jan 1855: Edward Rotheram of Crossdrum, Oldcastle, County Meath
- 30 Jan 1856: Robert John Cuming of Crover, Mountnugent
- 15 Jan 1857: Theophilus Henry Clements of Rakenny, Tullyvin
- 19 Jan 1858: James Arthur Dease of Turbotstown, Castlepollard, County Westmeath
- 1 Feb 1859: Edward James Saunderson of Castle Saunderson, Belturbet
- 20 Jan 1860: James Story of Ture, Belturbet
- 16 Jan 1861: Matthew O'Reilly Dease of Dee Farm, Dunleer, County Louth
- 20 Jan 1862: Alexander Nesbitt of Lismore
- 10 Jan 1863: Nathaniel Montgomery of Cullies, Cavan
- 9 Jan 1864: John Edward Vernon of Erne Hill, Belturbet
- 14 Jan 1865: George de la Poer Beresford of Aubawn, Killeshandra
- 14 Jan 1866: Benjamin Samuel Adams of Shinan House, Shercock
- 13 Jan 1867: Henry Sydenham Singleton of Hazeley Heath, Hampshire, England
- 15 Jan 1868: Richard Coote of Bellamont Forest, Cootehill
- 23 Jan 1869: Llewellyn Traherne Bassett Saunderson of Drumkeen House, Cavan
- 22 Jan 1870: Edmond Robert Nugent of Bobsgrove, Mountnugent
- 1 Feb 1871: James Saunderson Winter of Agher, Enfield, County Meath
- 31 Jan 1872: Robert Erskine of Erskine House, Cavan
- 21 Jan 1873: John Fay of Moynehall, Cavan
- 20 Jan 1874: Alexander J. William Sankey of Fort Frederick, Virginia
- 19 Jan 1875: William Leslie of Cootehill
- 21 Jan 1876: Samuel Saunderson of Cloverhill, Belturbet
- 19 Jan 1877: William Humphreys of Ballyhaise House, Ballyhaise
- 18 Apr 1877: Somerset Henry Maxwell of Arley Cottage, Mountnugent
- 19 Jan 1878: Edward Smith of Bellamont Forest, Cootehill
- 19 Jan 1879: John Winter Humphreys of Ballyhaise House, Ballyhaise
- 22 Jan 1880: Charles George Henry Coote of Mortimer House, Mortimer, Berkshire, England
- 23 Feb 1881: James Henry Fay of Faybrook, Cootehill
- 25 Jan 1882: William Henry Moutray Leslie of Castletown House, Bailieborough
- 27 Jan 1883: Robert James Burrowes of Stradone House, Stradone
- 23 Jan 1884: John Joseph Benison of Slieve Russell House, Ballyconnell
- 24 Jan 1885: Charles Brinsley Marlay of Belvedere House, Mullingar, County Westmeath
- 23 Jan 1886: William Joseph Hamilton of Drummany House, Killeshandra
- 26 Jan 1887: William Adams of Drumelton House, Cootehill
- 24 Jan 1888: Thomas Cosby Burrowes of Lismore House, Crossdoney
- 17 Jan 1889: Sir Robert Adair Hodson, 4th Baronet of Hollybrook House, Bray, County Wicklow
- 21 Jan 1890: Fane Vernon of Erne Hill, Belturbet
- 19 Feb 1891: Henry John Beresford Clements of Ashfield lodge, Cootehill
- 18 Feb 1892: Samuel Black Roe of Ballyconnell House, Ballyconnell
- 31 Jan 1893: Thomas Gerrard of Gibbstown, Navan, County Meath
- 23 Jan 1894: Joseph Pratt of Cabra Castle, Kingscourt
- 22 Jan 1895: John Rolland Singleton of Hazeley Heath, Winchfield, Hampshire, England
- 18 Feb 1896: James Hugh Moore-Garrett of Corriewood, Castlewellan, County Down.
- 12 Jan 1897: Edward Patrick Smith of Bellamont Forest, Cootehill.
- 20 Feb 1898: Edward Smith of Bellamont Forest, Cootehill.
- 19 Jan 1899: Gerald Dease of Turbotstown, Coole, County Westmeath.
- 16 Jan 1900: Sir Henry Cochrane of Woodbrook, Bray, County Wicklow.
- 18 Jan 1901: Edward Shaw Tener of Kilnahard, Mountnugent.

== Edward VII, 1901–1910 ==
- 14 Jan 1902: Thomas James Burrowes of Stradone House, Stradone
- 16 Jan 1903: Austen Morgan Rotherham of Crossdrum, Oldcastle, County Meath
- 9 Jan 1904: Robert Cecil Richard Clifford of Carn Cottage, Kildallan
- 14 Jan 1905: Theophilus Edward Lucas Clements of Rathkenny, Cootehill
- 3 Jan 1906: Edward Beresford of Aubawn, Killeshandra
- 12 Jan 1907: Somerset Saunderson of Castle Saunderson, Belturbet
- 8 Jan 1908: Edmond O'Connor of Charleville, Dunleer, County Louth
- 5 Jan 1909: Robert Story of Mount Salus, Dalkey, County Dublin
- 22 Dec 1909: Henry Edward Maxwell of Arley, Mountnugent

== George V 1910–1936 ==
- 6 Jan 1911: Frederick Paul Smith of Kevitt Castle, Crossdoney.
- 31 Dec 1911: Edward William Fleming of 25 Grimston Avenue, Folkestone, England.
- 1 Jan 1913: Richard Jones Sankey of 63 Merrion Square, Dublin
- 1914: Joseph Maxwell Greene of Tullyvin House, Cootehill.
- 1915: Major John James Pardon of Cloverhill, Belturbet & Clondriss, Killucan, County Westmeath.
- 1916: Colonel Edward A.H. Roe of Ballyconnell House, Ballyconnell.
- 1917: Joseph Arnold Arthur Benison of Slieve Russell House, Ballyconnell.
- 1918: Thomas Cosby Burrowes of Lismore Lodge, Crossdoney.
- 1919: Thomas J. Burrowes of Stradone House, Cavan.
- 1920: Edward Patrick Dorman-Smith of Bellamont House, Cootehill.
- 1921: Major Mervyn Pratt of Cabra Castle, Kingscourt.
