= Edward James Saunderson =

Irish unionist politician

Colonel The Right Honourable Edward James Saunderson PC DL JP
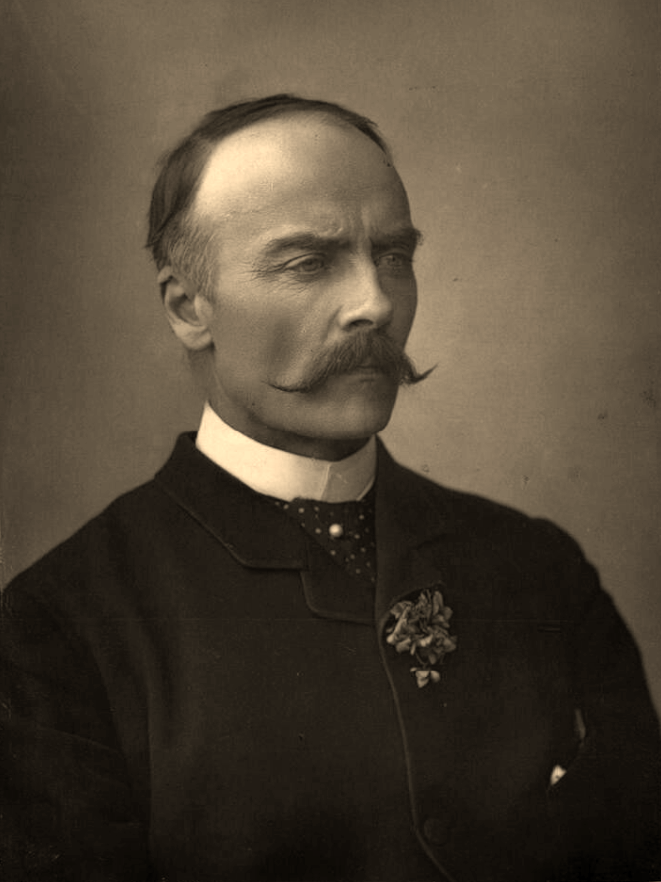
- Photograph of Colonel Saunderson, c. 1891

1st Leader of the Ulster Unionist Party
- In office 1905–1906
- Preceded by: Office established
- Succeeded by: Walter Long

1st Leader of the Irish Unionist Alliance
- In office 1891–1906
- Preceded by: Office established
- Succeeded by: Walter Long

Member of Parliament for North Armagh
- In office 18 December 1885 – 21 October 1906
- Preceded by: Constituency established
- Succeeded by: William Moore

Member of Parliament for County Cavan
- In office 23 July 1865 – 31 January 1874 Serving with The 5th Earl Annesley
- Preceded by: The 9th Baron Farnham; The 5th Earl Annesley
- Succeeded by: Charles Joseph Fay; Joseph Biggar

Personal details
- Born: 1 October 1837 Castle Saunderson, Belturbet, County Cavan, Ireland
- Died: 21 October 1906 (aged 69) Castle Saunderson, Belturbet, County Cavan, Ireland
- Citizenship: British
- Party: Irish Unionist Alliance; Ulster Unionist Party
- Other political affiliations: Irish Conservative (until 1891); Liberal (until 1869)
- Spouse: Helena Emily de Moleyns
- Children: 5
- Parent(s): Alexander Saunderson; Sarah Juliana Maxwell

Military service
- Allegiance: United Kingdom of Great Britain and Ireland
- Branch/service: British Army
- Years of service: 1862–1893
- Rank: Colonel
- Unit: Royal Irish Fusiliers
- Commands: 4th Battalion, Royal Irish Fusiliers

Colonel Edward James Saunderson PC DL JP (1 October 1837 – 21 October 1906) was an Anglo-Irish landowner and prominent Irish unionist politician. He led the Irish Unionist Alliance between 1891 and 1906.

== Early life ==
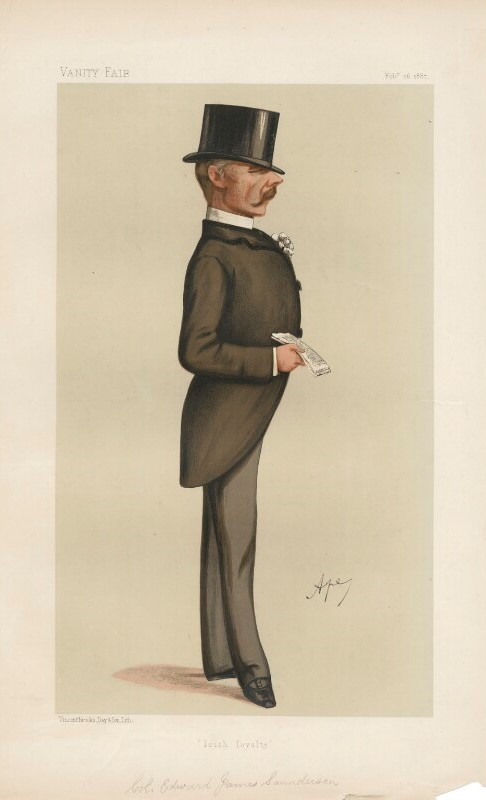
"Irish loyalty". Caricature by 'Ape' published in Vanity Fair in 1887.

Saunderson was born at the family seat of Castle Saunderson, near Belturbet in County Cavan. He was the younger son of Colonel Alexander Saunderson, who served as the Tory Member of Parliament (MP) for County Cavan, and The Hon. Sarah Juliana Maxwell.

His maternal grandfather was Henry Maxwell, 6th Baron Farnham. The Irish Saundersons were a 17th-century branch of an old family, originally from Durham; a Lincolnshire branch, the Saundersons of Saxby, held the titles of Viscount Castleton (Irish: created 1628) and Baron Saunderson (British: created 1714) up to 1723. Saunderson was educated abroad, mostly in Nice by private tutors, and inherited his father's County Cavan estates following his death in 1857.

== Career ==
Saunderson was first elected to the Parliament of the United Kingdom as the Palmerstonian Liberal member for Cavan in 1865. In 1869, he became a Conservative. Other than opposing the disestablishment of the Irish church in 1869, he otherwise gave little sign of political interest or activity at this stage. Saunderson lost his seat to the Home Rule League candidates, Joseph Biggar and Charles Joseph Fay, at the 1874 general election.

In 1885, he stood again for Parliament and was elected as a Conservative for the North Armagh constituency. In 1882 Saunderson had donned an Orange sash arguing that "the Orange society is alone capable of dealing with the condition of anarchy and rebellion which prevail in Ireland". He retained his North Armagh seat in the 1886 election. He was subsequently involved in organising the establishment of the Irish Unionist Alliance (IUA), a political party which sought to unite the unionist movement across Ireland. He became the IUA's first leader in 1891, a position which he held until his death. Saunderson became known for his uncompromising speeches in the House of Commons, and he was nicknamed "the Dancing Dervish" by friends and opponents. He was invested as a member of Her Majesty's Most Honourable Privy Council in 1898 in recognition of his political service.

Saunderson had entered the Cavan militia (4th battalion Royal Irish Fusiliers) in 1862, and was made a major in 1875. He became a colonel in 1886 and was in command of the battalion from 1891 to 1893. In March 1893, Saunderson was one of the signatories of the manifesto of the Ulster Defence Union, launched to organise resistance to the Second Home Rule Bill of 1893.

He was a Justice of the Peace and Deputy Lieutenant for Cavan, and was appointed High Sheriff of Cavan in 1859. He served as the grand master of the Orange Order lodge in Belfast from 1901 to 1903.

== Personal life ==
On 22 June 1865 he married The Hon. Helena Emily de Moleyns, a daughter of Thomas de Moleyns, 3rd Baron Ventry and the former Eliza Theodora Blake (a daughter of Sir John Blake, 11th Baronet). Together the couple had four sons (two of whom were British Army officers) and a daughter, including:

- Rosa Sarah Saunderson (1867–1952), who married Maj. Henry Nugent Head, a son of Henry Haswell Head, in 1892.
- Somerset Francis Saunderson (1868–1927), who married Marie Satterfield, a daughter of John M. Satterfield, and former wife of Count Franz Joseph von Larisch.
- Armar Dayrolles Saunderson (1872–1952), who married Anne Mills Archbold, a daughter of John Dustin Archbold, in 1906. They divorced and he married Mrs. Rose Hogg (d. 1955) of Bagnor Manor, in 1922.
- John Vernon Saunderson (1878–1960), who married Hon. Eva Norah Helen Mulholland, a daughter of Henry Mulholland, 2nd Baron Dunleath, in 1910.

In his private life, Saunderson was well known as a keen yachtsman, and his character was deeply marked by stern religious feeling. He was a devout Evangelical Anglican.

He died of pneumonia in 1906. In 1910, a statue, erected by public subscription, was unveiled at Portadown in Northern Ireland.

=== Descendants ===
In 1947, his grandson, Alexander Saunderson (1917–2004), married Princess Louise (née Louise Astor Van Alen), great-granddaughter of Titanic victim, John Jacob Astor IV, and the ex-wife of two different Georgian Mdivani princes. They remained married until her death in 1998.

Through his daughter Rosa, he was a grandfather of Col. Henry William Nugent Head (1898–1964), who married Ruth M. Kresge, daughter of American chain store executive Sebastian S. Kresge. A prominent sportsman, in 1928 he hunted with Theodore and Kermit Roosevelt, who was his best man at his wedding to Ruth in 1933.

== Bibliography ==
- Reginald Lucas, Memoir (1908).
- "Col. Saunderson Dead.", The New York Times, 22 October 1906.

Parliament of the United Kingdom
Preceded by James Maxwell; Hugh Annesley	Member of Parliament for County Cavan; 1865–1874; With: Hugh Annesley	Succeeded by Charles Joseph Fay; Joseph Biggar
New constituency	Member of Parliament for North Armagh; 1885–1906	Succeeded by William Moore
Honorary titles
Preceded by Lord Farnham	Lord Lieutenant of Cavan; 1900–1906	Succeeded by Thomas Lough
