= Henry Maxwell, 7th Baron Farnham =

Irish peer, Member of Parliament, evangelical Orangeman and landowner

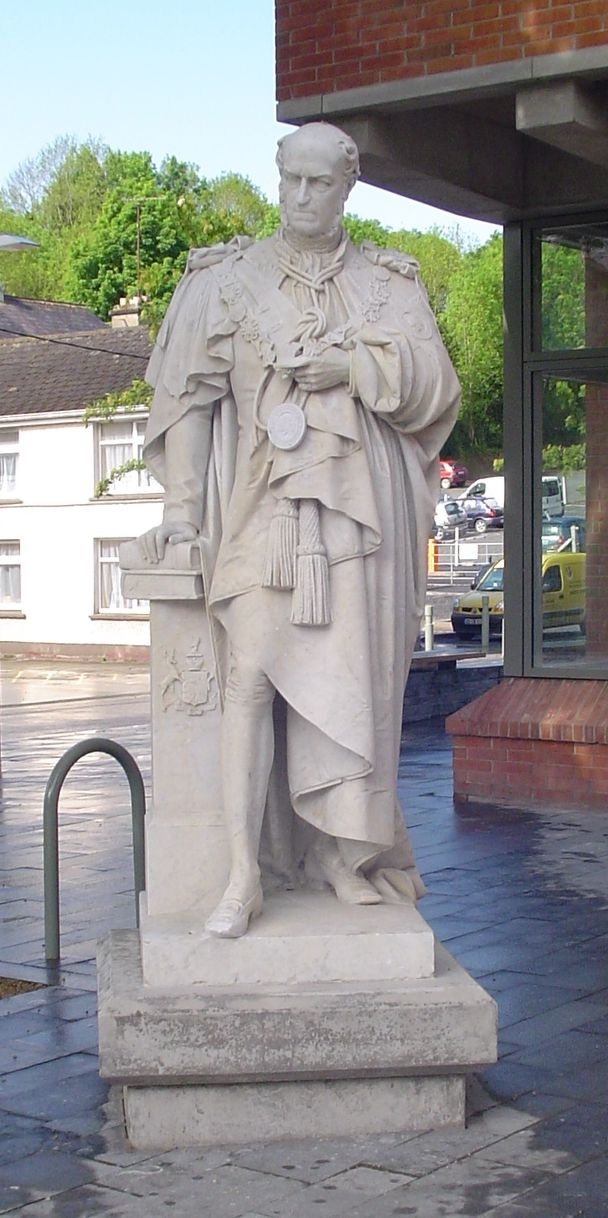
Statue of The Rt Hon. Henry, 7th Baron Farnham, K.P. This statue stands outside the Johnston Central Library on Farnham Street in Cavan Town. It depicts Lord Farnham wearing the mantle and robes of a Knight of St. Patrick. The statue originally stood in the now long gone Farnham Gardens, which were on the opposite side of Farnham Street, slightly further along the street.

The Rt Hon. Henry Maxwell, 7th Baron Farnham, K.P. (9 August 1799 – 20 August 1868), was an Irish peer, a Member of Parliament, an evangelical Orangeman and County Cavan landowner. During the hunger years of late 1820s and late 1840s, he was much reviled for evicting tenants and for offering relief only on condition of conversion to Protestantism.

== Political career ==
Lord Farnham was the son of The 6th Baron Farnham and Lady Anne Butler. In 1824, he was elected to the House of Commons for County Cavan and continued to occupy the seat as a Conservative until 1838. The latter year he succeeded his father to become the 7th Baron Farnham, inheriting the huge Farnham Estate in County Cavan, and subsequently served as an Irish representative peer from 1839 to 1868. He was made a Knight of St. Patrick in 1845.

In Parliament, Maxwell voted against Catholic relief, against parliamentary reform, and against provision for the Irish poor through tax on absentee landowners

Honours notwithstanding, Maxwell was regarded even in official circles as a particularly unfortunate example of an absentee. In 1823, Robert Peel, then Home Secretary, commented that "such men as Mr. Henry Maxwell, drawing enormous sums from Irish livings, and leading a profligate life at Boulogne, are the real enemies of the establishment".

== Evicting and evangelizing landlord ==
In 1827, the liberal lawyer George Ensor was asked James Warren Doyle, the Catholic Bishop of Kildare and Leighlin, to investigate claims of hundreds of tenants converting to Protestantism on the Farnham estate. Ensor's reports assured the bishop that, such as they were, the conversions were a case of "souperism" and would not survive the near-famine conditions in the area.

Maxwell, meanwhile, moved a resolution for establishing a subscription for the loyalist Brunswick Club at the county meeting in Cavan and was prominent in Protestant activities there and in Dublin, where he had become secretary of the Orange Order.

In the Great Famine from 1845, the estate again accused of souperism—Maxwell (now Lord Farnham) was opening his soup kitchens only to those who would abjure their Catholic faith and take Anglican communion in the established Church of Ireland. He also was seen to continue with evictions.

== Death and commemoration ==
Maxwell was killed with his wife, and about 30 others, in the Abergele rail disaster in August 1868. They in the front carriage of the London to Holyhead express at Chester when it collided with a goods train carrying petroleum. Their incinerated remains were only identifiable from their pocket watches. He was succeeded in his title and estates by his brother, himself a former Conservative Member for Cavan, Somerset Richard (1803–84).

A statue in his honour was erected in Cavan, funded by a levy exacted on his tenants by his younger brother and heir. It now stands outside Cavan County Council offices.

Parliament of the United Kingdom
Preceded by Nathaniel Sneyd; John Maxwell-Barry	Member of Parliament for County Cavan; 1824–1839; With: Nathaniel Sneyd 1824–1826; Alexander Saunderson 1826–1831; Sir John Young 1831–1839	Succeeded by Sir John Young; Somerset Maxwell
Political offices
Preceded by The Earl of Caledon	Representative peer for Ireland; 1839–1868	Succeeded by The Earl of Rosse
Peerage of Ireland
Preceded by Henry Maxwell	Baron Farnham; 1839–1868	Succeeded by Somerset Maxwell
