= John Young, 1st Baron Lisgar =

British politician and diplomat (1807–1876)

The Right Honourable The Lord Lisgar GCB GCMG PC
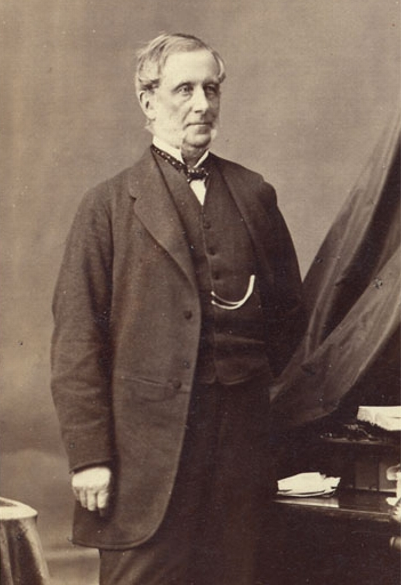
- Lisgar, c. 1876

2nd Governor General of Canada
- In office 2 February 1869 – 25 June 1872
- Monarch: Victoria
- Prime Minister: Sir John A. Macdonald
- Preceded by: The Viscount Monck
- Succeeded by: The Earl of Dufferin

12th Governor of New South Wales
- In office 1861–1867
- Monarch: Victoria
- Preceded by: Sir William Denison
- Succeeded by: The Earl Belmore

Chief Secretary for Ireland
- In office 1 March 1853 – 30 January 1855
- Monarch: Victoria
- Prime Minister: The Earl of Aberdeen
- Preceded by: Lord Naas
- Succeeded by: Edward Horsman

Personal details
- Born: 31 August 1807 Bombay, Bombay Presidency, British India
- Died: 6 October 1876 (aged 69) Bailieborough, County Cavan, Ireland
- Spouse: Adelaide Dalton (m. 1835)
- Education: Eton College; Corpus Christi College, Oxford

John Young, 1st Baron Lisgar (31 August 1807 – 6 October 1876), known from 1848 to 1870 as Sir John Young, 2nd Baronet, was a British diplomat and politician who served as the second governor general of Canada from 1869 to 1872. He previously served as the 12th governor of New South Wales, from 1861 to 1867, and as Chief Secretary for Ireland, from 1853 to 1855.

== Biography ==
Young was born into an Anglo-Irish family in Bombay, India, eldest son of Sir William Young, 1st Baronet of Bailieborough Castle, who was a director of the East India Company. He was educated at Eton and Corpus Christi College, Oxford, graduating in 1829 and was called to the bar in 1834. He married Adelaide Annabella Tuite Dalton in 1835.

In 1831 he became a Member of Parliament (MP), as the member for County Cavan in the House of Commons of the United Kingdom, a position he held for 24 years. A Conservative, in 1841 Young was a Lord of the Treasury for Sir Robert Peel, Secretary of the Treasury in 1844. Young stayed loyal to Peel when the party split over the repeal of the Corn Laws. He became a Peelite and was appointed Chief Secretary for Ireland from 1852 to 1855. Young was appointed Lord High Commissioner to the Ionian Islands in 1855. His secret despatches recommending that the islands become a British colony were leaked, leading to his recall in 1859.

Young was appointed Governor of New South Wales in 1860 and was immediately confronted by a crisis stemming from the attempt by the Secretary for Lands, John Robertson, to push radical land legislation through the Parliament. This legislation was passionately opposed by the majority of the Legislative Council. Young agreed to the request of the Premier, Charles Cowper, to swamp the council with new 21 appointees to get the legislation through, although in fact sufficient members of the Council resigned that a quorum could not be formed, forcing it to be prorogued and replaced by a new Council with appointed life members. In due course this passed the land legislation. The rest of his term in New South Wales was less eventful.

Young assumed the office of Governor General of Canada in 1868, when it was vacated by fellow Irishman, the 4th Viscount Monck, but did not officially take up the position until his swearing in on 2 February 1869. After the end of his term in 1872, he returned to Ireland.

He was raised to the peerage as Baron Lisgar, of Lisgar and Bailieborough, in the County of Cavan, on 26 October 1870.

He died on 6 October 1876 at Lisgar House (also known as Castle House), near Bailieborough in County Cavan, Ireland, survived by his wife. Although Lady Lisgar married once more, she and Lord Lisgar are buried in Bailieborough Church of Ireland Graveyard, Bailieborough, County Cavan.

== Family ==
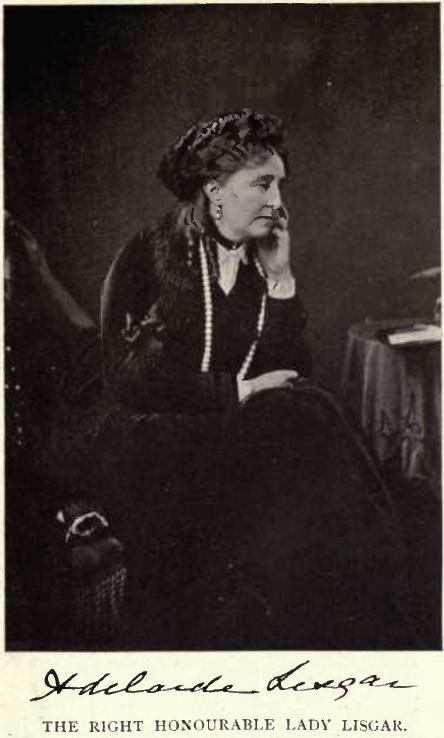
Lady Lisgar by William James Topley

John Young married, on 8 April 1835, Adelaide Annabella Dalton, daughter of Edward Tuite Dalton of Fermor, County Meath, Ireland, and his wife, Olivia, daughter of Sir John Stevenson (who married, secondly, The 2nd Marquess of Headfort, K.P., P.C.). Dalton's date of birth is unknown; however, she was likely to have been born between 1811 and 1814. Her husband was raised to the peerage, as Baron Lisgar in 1870, and died on 6 October 1876. On 3 August 1878 Baroness Lisgar married her second husband, Sir Francis Charles Fortescue Turville of Bosworth Hall, Leicestershire. She married her third husband, Henry Trueman Mills, of Lubenham, Market Harborough. She died at Paris on 19 July 1895.

== Legacy ==
- Lisgar Collegiate Institute on Lisgar Street in Ottawa takes its name from Lord Lisgar. A likeness of Lord Lisgar is prominently displayed in the school's library.
- Lisgar Street in Toronto and Lisgar Avenue in Saskatoon takes its name from Lord Lisgar.
- In Mississauga, Ontario, a community in the Meadowvale neighbourhood has been called Lisgar. In the fall of 2007, a new Lisgar GO Station was opened on the Milton GO train line, and a Lisgar Middle School in the neighbourhood within the Peel District School Board.
- The Sir John Young Hotel in Sydney, Australia, is named after the baron
- Sir John Young Crescent, Woolloomooloo, Australia, is named after the baron
- The town of Young, NSW, was named after the baron.
- The lake in Tillsonburg, Ontario, was named after the Baron: Lake Lisgar.

== Arms ==
Coat of arms of John Young, 1st Baron Lisgar
Crest A demi-lion gules charged on the shoulder with a trefoil slipped and holding a sprig of three maple leaves or; Escutcheon Argent three piles sable, each charged with a trefoil slipped or, on a chief Sable three annulets or. Supporters Two women vested argent, the one to the dexter mantled azure and holding in her dexter hand a paddle or, the one to the sinister mantled vert and holding in her sinister hand a crook or. Motto “Prudentia” (Prudence). Orders The Most Honourable Order of the Bath - Knight Grand Cross (GCB); The Most Distinguished Order of St. Michael and St. George - Knight Grand Cross (GCMG).

== Notes ==
Parliament of the United Kingdom
Preceded by Alexander Saunderson; Henry Maxwell	Member of Parliament for County Cavan; 1831–1855; With: Henry Maxwell to 1839; Somerset Maxwell 1839–40; Henry John Clements 1840–43; James Pierce Maxwell from 1843	Succeeded by James Pierce Maxwell; Robert Burrowes
Political offices
Preceded by Alexander Perceval	Junior Lord of the Treasury; 1841–1844	Succeeded by The Lord Arthur Lennox
Preceded by Sir Denis Le Marchnat	Financial Secretary to the Treasury; 1844–1845	Succeeded by Edward Cardwell
Preceded by Sir George Clerk	Parliamentary Secretary to the Treasury; 1845–1846	Succeeded by Henry Tufnell
Preceded by Lord Naas	Chief Secretary for Ireland; 1853–1855	Succeeded by Edward Horsman
Government offices
Preceded by Sir William Denison	Governor of New South Wales; 1861–1867	Succeeded by The Earl Belmore
Preceded by The Viscount Monck	Governor General of Canada; 1869–1872	Succeeded by The Earl of Dufferin
Honorary titles
Preceded by The Marquess of Headfort	Lord Lieutenant of Cavan; 1871–1876	Succeeded by The Earl of Lanesborough
Peerage of the United Kingdom
New creation	Baron Lisgar; 1870–1876	Extinct
Baronetage of the United Kingdom
Preceded by Sir William Young	Baronet (of Bailieborough); 1848–1876	Succeeded by Sir William Young
