= John Maxwell-Barry, 5th Baron Farnham =

Irish Representative peer and politician

John Maxwell-Barry, 5th Baron Farnham PC (Ire) (18 January 1767 – 20 September 1838) was an Irish representative peer and politician.

He was the son of Henry Maxwell, Lord Bishop of Meath, and grandson of John Maxwell, 1st Baron Farnham. He married on 4 July 1789 to Juliana Lucy Annesley (died 10 October 1833), daughter of Arthur Annesley, 1st Earl of Mountnorris, 8th Viscount Valentia.

In 1788, Maxwell-Barry stood as Member of Parliament for County Cavan, however, was declared not duly elected. He later represented Doneraile in the Irish House of Commons from 1792 to 1798, and subsequently Newtown Limavady until the Act of Union in 1801. He was appointed High Sheriff of Carlow for 1795-96 and Governor of co. Cavan for 1805 to 1831. He was also Colonel of the Cavan Militia between 1797 and 1823.

In the House of Commons of the United Kingdom, he was Member of Parliament (MP) for County Cavan from 1806 to 1824. He was appointed a Privy Councillor in Ireland on 7 July 1809. On the death of his first cousin, he succeeded as 5th Baron Farnham on 23 July 1823 and inherited the Farnham estate. He was elected an Irish representative peer on 17 December 1825.

He died without issue and so the barony and estate passed to his brother Henry.

Parliament of Ireland
Preceded by Charles Stewart; George Montgomey	Member of Parliament for County Cavan; 1788; With: Charles Stewart	Succeeded by Charles Stewart; Francis Saunderson
Preceded by John Bagwell; James Chatterton	Member of Parliament for Doneraile; 1792–1798; With: James Chatterton	Succeeded by Peter Holmes; John Townsend
Preceded by Robert Stewart, Viscount Castlereagh; Hugh Carncross	Member of Parliament for Newtown Limavady; 1798 – 1801; With: Hugh Carncross 1798; Eyre Power Trench 1798–1799; Charles Trench 1799–1801	Succeeded by Parliament of the United Kingdom
Parliament of the United Kingdom
Preceded by Francis Saunderson; Nathaniel Sneyd	Member of Parliament for County Cavan; 1806 – 1824; With: Nathaniel Sneyd	Succeeded by Henry Maxwell; Alexander Saunderson
Political offices
Preceded by The Earl of Donoughmore	Representative peer for Ireland; 1825–1838	Succeeded by The Viscount de Vesci
Peerage of Ireland
Preceded by John James Maxwell	Baron Farnham; 1823–1838	Succeeded by Henry Maxwell
