= Baron Farnham =

Title of nobility in the peerage of Ireland

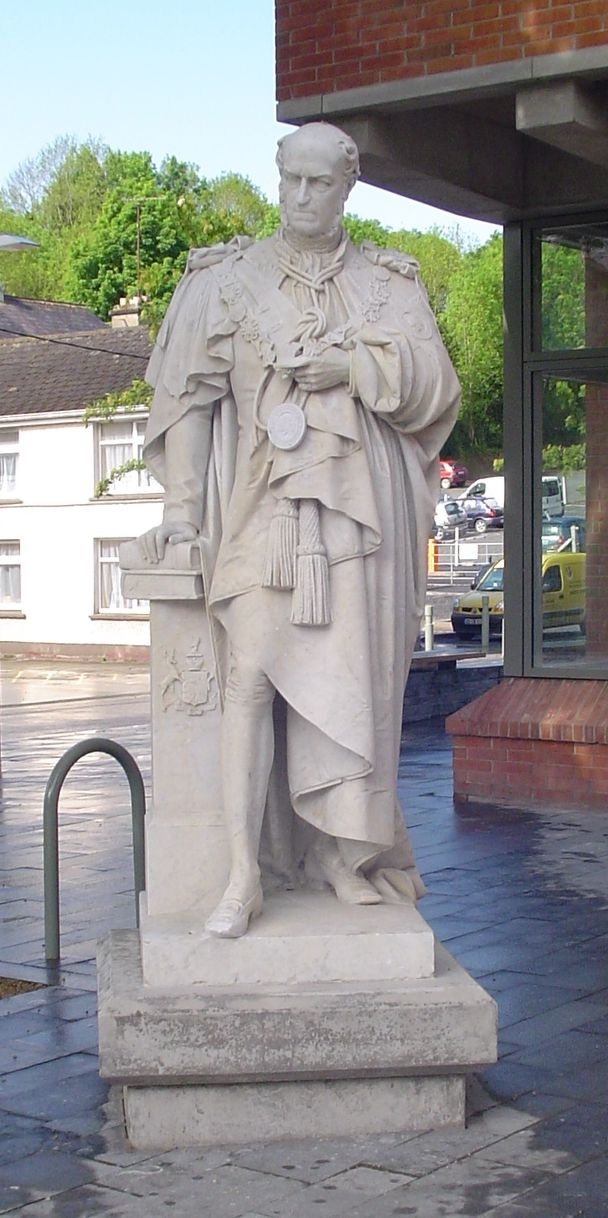
Statue of The Rt Hon. Henry, 7th Baron Farnham, K.P., outside the Johnston Central Library on Farnham Street (also known as Casement Street) in Cavan Town. The statue depicts Lord Farnham wearing the mantle and robes of a Knight of St. Patrick. This statue originally stood in the now long gone Farnham Gardens, a public park which was formerly located further along Farnham Street.

Baron Farnham, of Farnham in the County of Cavan, is a title in the Peerage of Ireland. It was created in 1756 for John Maxwell, who had previously represented Cavan Borough in the Irish House of Commons. John Maxwell's son, the second Baron, was created Viscount Farnham in 1760 and Earl of Farnham in 1763. Both titles were in the Peerage of Ireland but became extinct when he died childless in 1779. His brother and successor, the third Baron, was again created Viscount Farnham in 1781 and Earl of Farnham in 1785. These titles were also in the Peerage of Ireland. His son, the second Earl, sat in the House of Lords as an Irish representative peer from 1816 to 1823. However, he had no children and on his death in 1823 the viscountcy and earldom became extinct.

He was succeeded in the barony by his first cousin, the fifth Baron. He was the eldest son of The Rt Rev. and Hon. Henry Maxwell, Lord Bishop of Meath, third son of the first Baron. Lord Farnham sat as a Member of Parliament for County Cavan and was an Irish Representative Peer in the House of Lords from 1825 to 1838. His nephew, the seventh Baron (who succeeded his father in 1838), also represented County Cavan in the House of Commons and served as an Irish Representative Peer between 1839 and 1868. Lord Farnham and his wife were killed in the Abergele train disaster of 1868. The title then passed to his younger brother, the eighth Baron, who had earlier represented County Cavan in Parliament. He was succeeded by another brother, the ninth Baron, who also sat as a Member of Parliament for County Cavan. In 1885 he succeeded a distant relative as eleventh Baronet of Calderwood. On his death, the titles passed to his nephew, the tenth Baron. He served as Lord Lieutenant of County Cavan and was briefly an Irish Representative Peer from 1898 until his early death in 1900. His son, the eleventh Baron, sat in the House of Lords as an Irish Representative Peer from 1908 to 1957. As of 2014 the titles are held by his grandson, the thirteenth Baron, who succeeded his elder brother in 2001. Lord Farnham is the son of Lieutenant-Colonel the Hon. Somerset Arthur Maxwell. He lives in Oxfordshire in Great Britain.

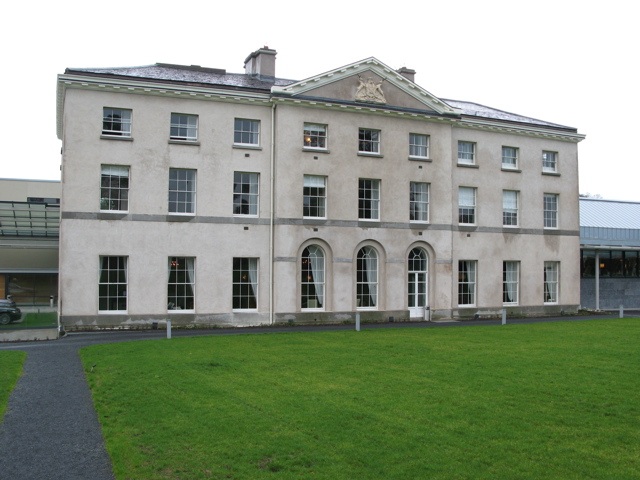
Farnham House, now a hotel, just outside Cavan Town.

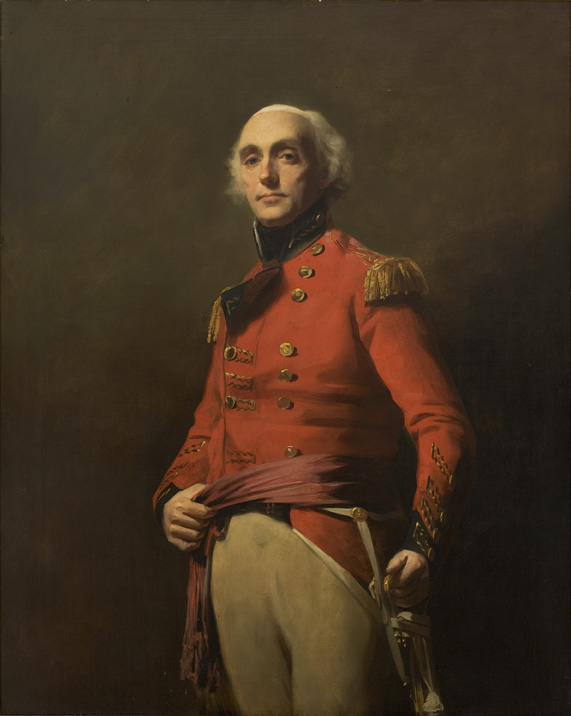
General Sir William Maxwell [7th Baronet?]. Painting by Henry Raeburn, São Paulo Museum of Art collection.

The Maxwell baronetcy of Calderwood was created in the Baronetage of Nova Scotia in 1627 for Sir James Maxwell (died c. 1670). The 2nd baronet died without issue, and was succeeded by a son of Colonel John Maxwell who died in Dunbar in 1650. The 6th baronet also died without issue, and was succeeded by the son of Alexander Maxwell of Leith, third son of 4th baronet. This line too failed, when his grandson, the tenth Baronet died in 1885. The next holder was the aforementioned 9th Baron, who succeeded as eleventh Baronet. The title passed to the 10th Baron and continued to his descendants.

The Farnhams are remembered in the name of one of the main streets in Cavan town, Farnham Street, as well as in the name of a hotel, The Farnham Arms, which has the family crest with inscription Je suis pret (I am ready) above the door.

The family seat was Farnham House, near Cavan, County Cavan.

== Barons Farnham (1756) ==
- John Maxwell, 1st Baron Farnham (died 1759)
- Robert Maxwell, 2nd Baron Farnham (died 1779) (created Earl of Farnham in 1763)

== Earls of Farnham, first creation (1763) ==
- Robert Maxwell, 1st Earl of Farnham, 2nd Baron Farnham (died 1779)

== Barons Farnham (1756; reverted) ==
- Barry Maxwell, 3rd Baron Farnham (died 1800) (created Earl of Farnham in 1785)

== Earls of Farnham, second creation (1785) ==
- Barry Maxwell, 1st Earl of Farnham (died 1800)
- John James Maxwell, 2nd Earl of Farnham (1760–1823)

== Barons Farnham (1756; reverted) ==
- John Maxwell-Barry, 5th Baron Farnham (1767–1838)
- Henry Maxwell, 6th Baron Farnham (1774–1838)
- Henry Maxwell, 7th Baron Farnham (1799–1868)
- Somerset Richard Maxwell, 8th Baron Farnham (1803–1884)
- James Pierce Maxwell, 9th Baron Farnham (1813–1896)
- Somerset Henry Maxwell, 10th Baron Farnham (1849–1900)
- Arthur Kenlis Maxwell, 11th Baron Farnham (1879–1957)
- Barry Owen Somerset Maxwell, 12th Baron Farnham (1931–2001)
- Simon Kenlis Maxwell, 13th Baron Farnham (born 1933)

The heir apparent is the present holder's son, Hon. Robin Somerset Maxwell (born 1965).
The heir apparent's heir apparent is his son, James David Somerset Maxwell (born 1996).

== Maxwell baronets, of Calderwood (1627) ==
The grave of Sir Hugh Bates Maxwell, 9th baronet, St Johns, Edinburgh

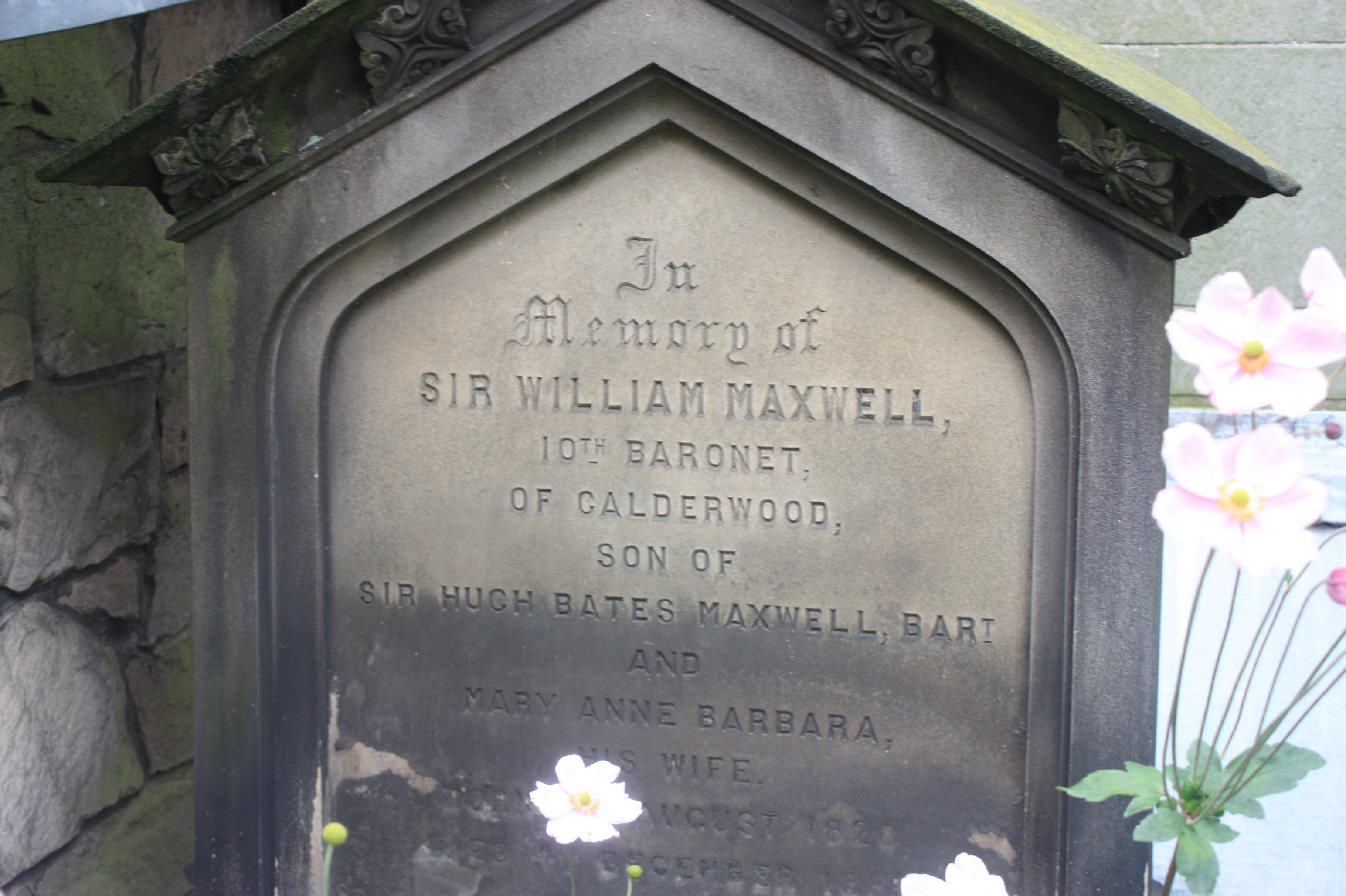
The grave of Sir William Maxwell, 10th baronet, St Johns, Edinburgh

- Sir James Maxwell, 1st Baronet (died c. 1670)
- Sir William Maxwell, 2nd Baronet (c. 1640–1703)
- Sir William Maxwell, 3rd Baronet (died 1716)
- Sir William Maxwell, 4th Baronet (died 1750)
- Sir William Maxwell, 5th Baronet (died 1789)
- Sir William Maxwell, 6th Baronet (1748–1829)
- Sir William Maxwell, 7th Baronet (1754–1837)
- Sir William Alexander Maxwell, 8th Baronet (1793–1865)
- Sir Hugh Bates Maxwell, 9th Baronet (1797–1870)
- Sir William Maxwell, 10th Baronet (1828–1885)
- Sir James Pierce Maxwell, 11th Baronet (1813–1896) (succeeded as Baron Farnham in 1884)

See above for further succession.
