= Robert Burrowes (Irish politician) =

Irish politician

Robert Burrowes (1810 – 30 November 1881) was an Irish Conservative Party politician who sat in the House of Commons from 1855 to 1857.

He was elected as one of the two Members of Parliament (MPs) for County Cavan at a by-election in April 1855. He did not contest the 1857 general election.

Parliament of the United Kingdom
Preceded by Sir John Young, Bt; James Pierce Maxwell	Member of Parliament for County Cavan; 1855–1857; With: James Pierce Maxwell	Succeeded by James Pierce Maxwell; Hugh Annesley
