= Hugh Annesley, 5th Earl Annesley =

British aristocrat, military officer, politician, and tree enthusiast (1831–1908)

The Earl Annesley
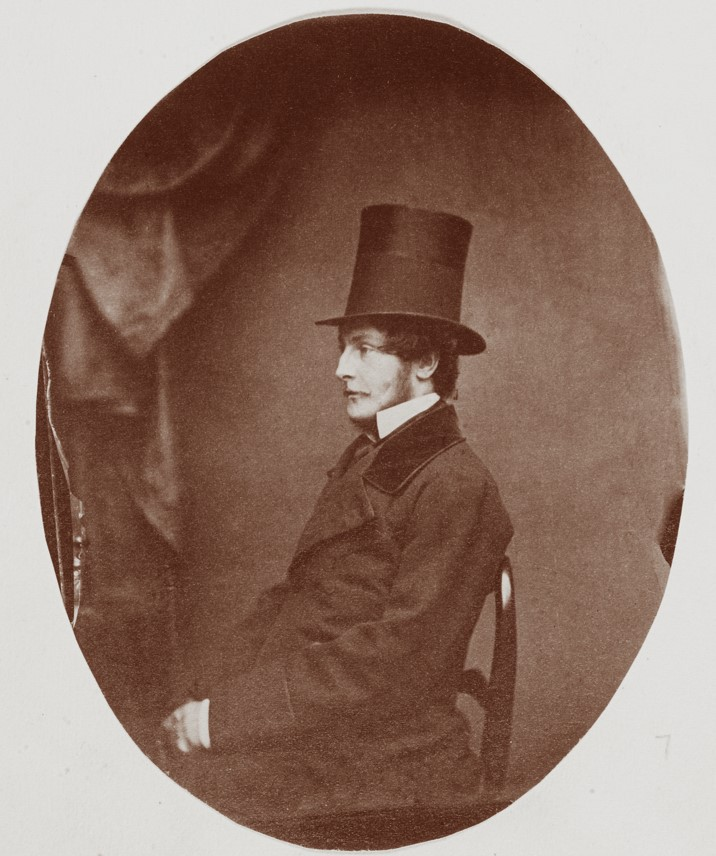

Personal details
- Born: 26 January 1831 Dublin, Ireland
- Died: 15 December 1908 (aged 77) Castlewellan, County Down
- Education: Trinity College, Dublin

Hugh Annesley, 5th Earl Annesley DL (26 January 1831 – 15 December 1908) was a British military officer and Member of Parliament for County Cavan from 1857 to 1874.

== Early life and family ==
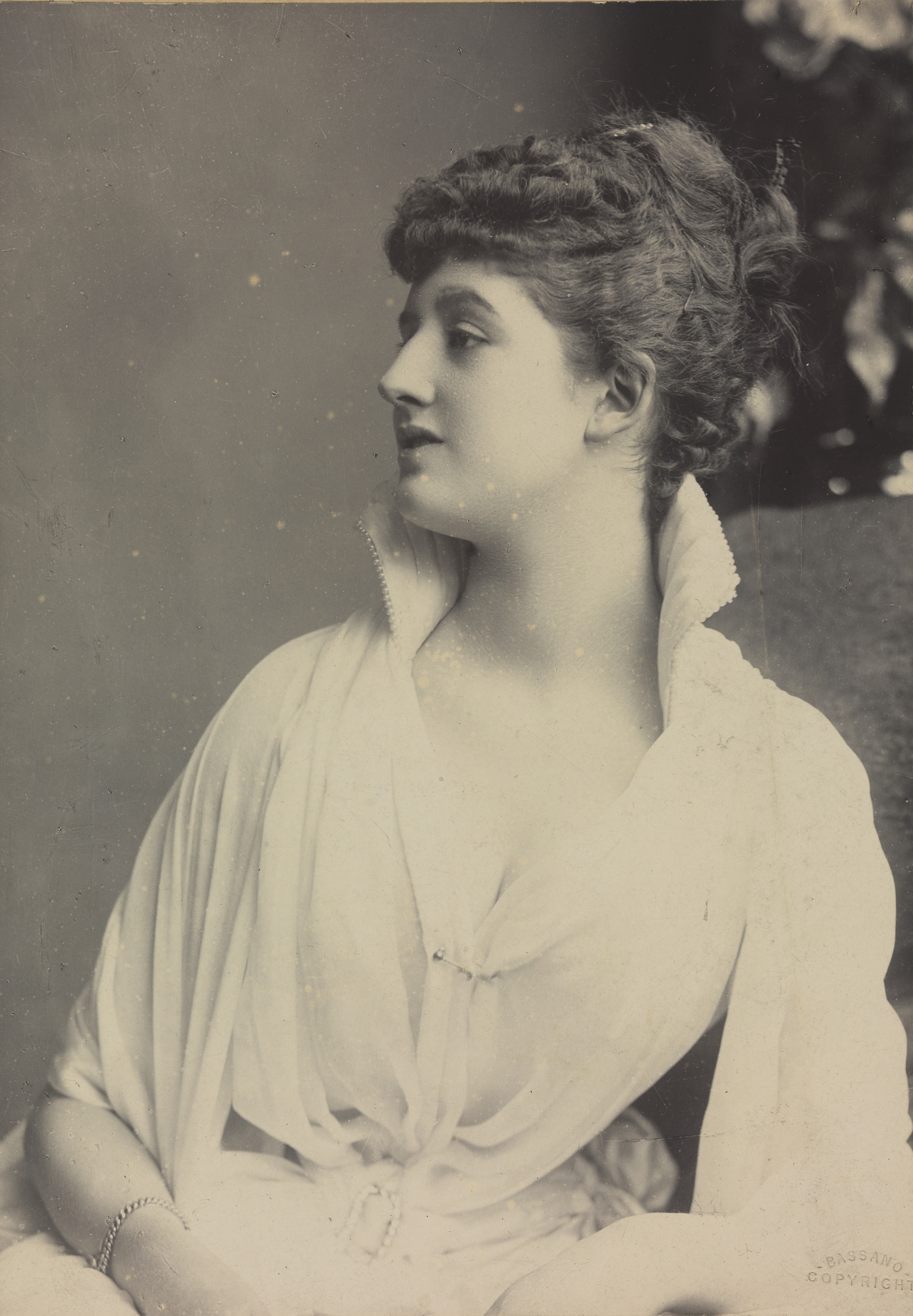
Priscilla Cecilia (née Moore), Countess Annesley, second wife of Hugh Annesley, 5th Earl Annesley

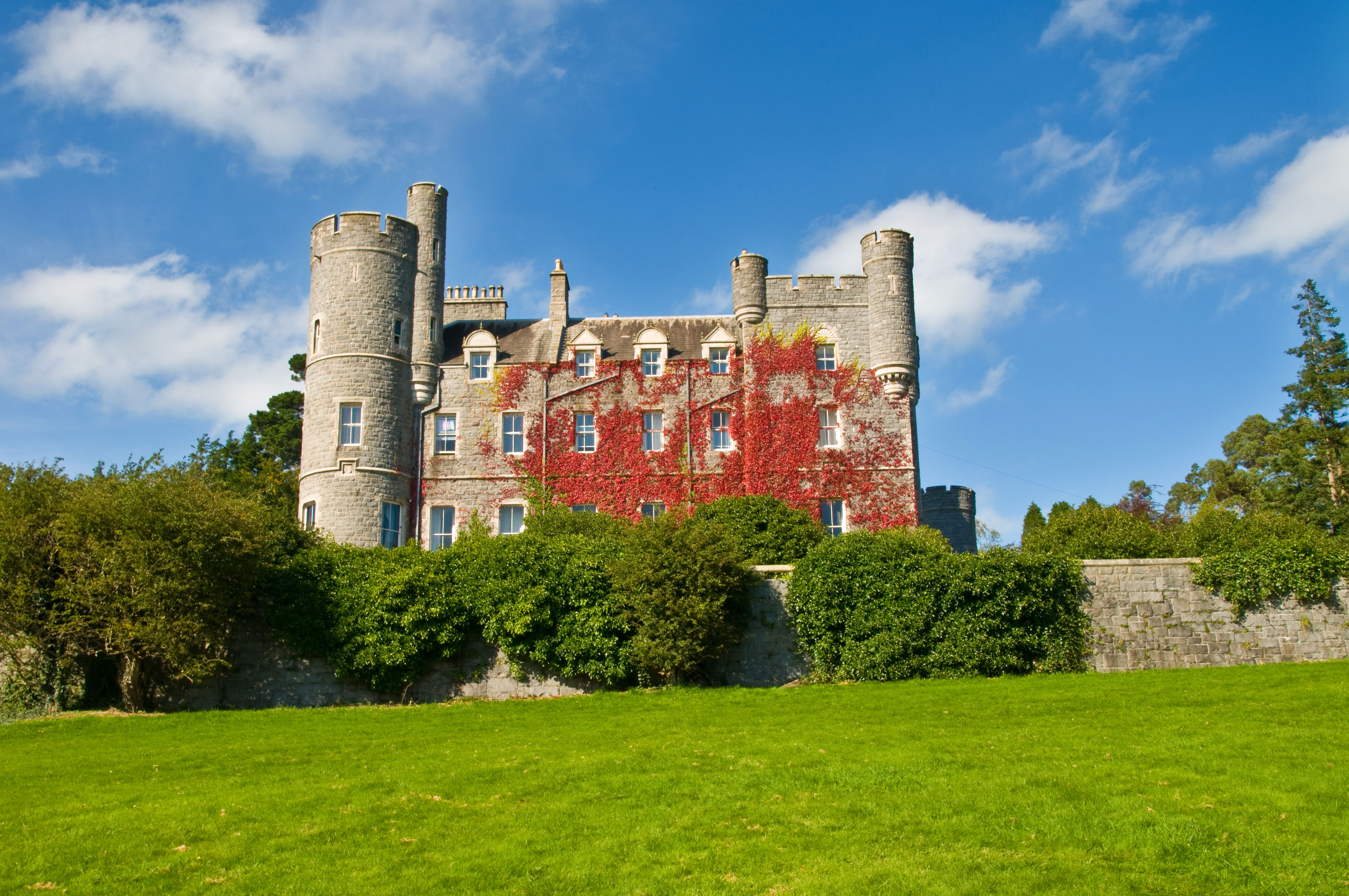
Castlewellan Castle

Annesley was born on 26 January 1831 in Dublin. He was the second son of William Richard Annesley, 3rd Earl Annesley and Priscilla Cecilia. He was educated at Eton College and Trinity College, Dublin, graduating in 1851.

He married, first, Mabel Wilhelmina Frances Markham on 4 July 1877. He was 46 and she was 19. They had a daughter, Lady Mabel Annesley (1881–1959), who became well known as a water colour painter and wood engraver, and a son, Francis (born 25 February 1884). Francis became 6th Earl Annesley, but was killed in November 1914 in the First World War. Countess Mabel Annesley died at Castlewellan on 17 April 1891 (within three weeks of the death of Hugh's mother, The Dowager Countess Annesley, wife of the Third Earl, on 29 March 1891).

He married, secondly, his first cousin, Priscilla Cecilia Armytage Moore (1870–1941) on 2 July 1892. He was 61 and she was 22. They had two daughters, Clare, born 30 June 1893, who became a pacifist and socialist, and Constance Mary, born 24 October 1895 who became Constance Malleson. Priscilla Cecilia, Countess Annesley, died at St James Square, Bath, on 9 October 1941. She was the second Countess Annesley of that name, her aunt, the wife of the Third Earl, also having been Priscilla Cecilia.

== Career ==
He became a professional soldier and served in the Kaffir Wars in South Africa, 1851 to 1853 in the 43rd Light Infantry. He was wounded in this war, and in the Crimean War his jaw was shattered by a bullet at the Battle of the Alma in 1854. He retired as a Colonel of the Scots Fusilier Guards in 1860. He was elected conservative MP for Cavan in 1857, holding the seat until 1874. This was a family seat, and Annesley was a reluctant politician, speaking rarely in the commons and only on army matters. He retired from politics when Cavan became a centre of support for Home Rule. Six months later, his brother William Richard Annesley, 4th Earl Annesley, died unmarried, and Hugh succeeded as 5th Earl Annesley and to the family seat of Castlewellan Castle. In 1877, he was elected as a Representative Peer, serving until his death.

== Later life and death ==
Annesley had a keen interest in horticulture and established an arboretum at Castlewellan. He was assisted in this by his head gardener, Thomas Ryan. He oversaw the creation of the Donard nursery company in Newcastle, County Down. He was a pioneering amateur photographer. At the request of the Royal Agricultural Society he published a book, Beautiful and rare trees and shrubs (1903), illustrated with his own photographs.

Annesley died on 15 December 1908 at Castlewellan. An obituary appeared in The Times which stated that Annesley had one of the largest collections of exotic shrubs and trees in the United Kingdom. The earldom and Castlewellan estate passed to his son Francis.

Thirty-five albums of his photographs are in the Public Record Office of Northern Ireland. They include pictures taken during the wars in South Africa and the Crimea, and during a visit to Japan, as well as photographs of his home at Castlewellan and the surrounding area.

Parliament of the United Kingdom
Preceded by James Pierce Maxwell; Robert Burrowes	Member of Parliament for County Cavan; 1857–1874; With: James Pierce Maxwell 1857–1865; Edward James Saunderson 1865–1874	Succeeded by Charles Joseph Fay; Joseph Gillis Biggar
Political offices
Preceded by The Earl of Bandon	Representative peer for Ireland; 1877–1908	Succeeded by The Viscount de Vesci
Peerage of Ireland
Preceded by William Annesley	Earl Annesley; 1874–1908	Succeeded by Francis Annesley
