= James Maxwell, 9th Baron Farnham =

Irish peer, Nova Scotia baronet and Member of Parliament

The Rt Hon. James Pierce Maxwell, 9th Baron Farnham (1813 – 26 October 1896), was an Irish peer, Nova Scotia baronet and Member of Parliament. He was known as The Hon. James Pierce Maxwell between September 1838 and June 1884.

He was the son of The Rev. The 6th Baron Farnham and Lady Anne Butler. He became a Member of Parliament for County Cavan on 17 February 1843. As a Lieutenant-Colonel in the 97th Foot, he was severely wounded during the Crimean War.

On his brother's death, he succeeded on 4 June 1884 as The 9th Baron Farnham, and later the next year, on 4 December 1885, he succeeded his distant cousin as 12th Baronet of Calderwood. Lord Farnham died unmarried and was succeeded by his nephew, Somerset Henry Maxwell.

Parliament of the United Kingdom
Preceded by Sir John Young; Henry John Clements	Member of Parliament for County Cavan; 1843–1865; With: Sir John Young 1831–1855; Robert Burrowes 1855–1857; Hugh Annesley 1857–1874	Succeeded by Hugh Annesley; Edward James Saunderson
Peerage of Ireland
Preceded by Somerset Richard Maxwell	Baron Farnham; 1884–1896	Succeeded by Somerset Henry Maxwell
Baronetage of Nova Scotia
Preceded by William Maxwell	Baronet (of Calderwood); 1885–1896	Succeeded by Somerset Henry Maxwell
