= William Hamilton (rugby union) =

Ireland international rugby union player

- Full name: William Joseph Hamilton
- Born: 1 July 1850
- Died: 22 May 1931 (aged 80)
- University: Trinity College Dublin

Rugby union career
- Position: Forward
International career
Years	Team	Apps	(Points)
1877	Ireland	1	(0)

William Joseph Hamilton (1 July 1850 – 22 May 1931) was an Irish international rugby union player.

Educated at Trinity College Dublin, Hamilton was a varsity athlete, cricketer and rugby union player, having most success in the latter with a cap for Ireland against England at The Oval in 1877.

Hamilton, a veteran of the Second Boer War, was an honorary major of the 4th Battalion, Royal Irish Fusiliers.

In 1886, Hamilton became the High Sheriff of Cavan, a position once occupied by his father.

== See also ==
- List of Ireland national rugby union players
