= Custos Rotulorum of Cavan =

Civil officer in Ireland

The Custos Rotulorum of Cavan was the highest civil officer in County Cavan. The position was later combined with that of Lord Lieutenant of Cavan.

== Incumbents ==
- ?–?1673 Sir Francis Hamilton, 1st Baronet (died 1673)
- 1673–?1689 Sir Charles Hamilton, Bt (died 1689)
- 1780–1800 Charles Coote, 1st Earl of Bellomont
- 1801–>1819 Nathaniel Sneyd (died 1833)
- 1831->1834 Thomas Taylour, 2nd Marquess of Headfort

For later custodes rotulorum, see Lord Lieutenant of Cavan
