= Alexander Saunderson =

Colonel Alexander Saunderson (1783–1857) was a Whig MP for County Cavan 1826–1831. He was a landed gentleman with 12,000 acres. Although from the Protestant planter tradition, he supported Catholic emancipation.

Alexander Saunderson was a keen racing yachtsman on Lough Erne and a founder member c. 1818 of the group that became Lough Erne Yacht Club. He designed and built fast sailing boats at Castle Saunderson – as did his son and successor Edward. One of his most successful boats he called Bluestocking. His mother and aunt were Bluestockings. He may also have been a member of the Royal Dublin Society.

== Family ==
Alexander was born to Francis Saunderson and Anne Bassett White.

The Irish Saundersons were a 17th-century branch of an old family, originally of Durham; a Lincolnshire branch, the Saundersons of Saxby, held the titles of Viscount Castleton (Irish: c. 1628) and Baron Saunderson (British: c. 1714) up to 1723.

On 18 March 1828, Saunderson married Sarah Juliana, sister of fellow Cavan MP, Henry Maxwell and daughter of the Henry Maxwell, 6th Baron Farnham. They had three sons and two daughters. Their son Edward James Saunderson was also MP for Cavan 1865–1874 and later became MP for North Armagh 1885–1906.

In 1947, Saunderson's great-grandson, also named Alexander, married Louise Astor Van Alen, granddaughter of James John Van Alen and grandniece of RMS Titanic victim John Jacob Astor IV, and the ex-wife of two different Georgian Mdivani princes.

Parliament of the United Kingdom
Preceded by Nathaniel Sneyd; Henry Maxwell	Member of Parliament for County Cavan; 1826–1831; With: Henry Maxwell	Succeeded by Henry Maxwell; John Young
