= Hazeley Heath =

Heathland in Hazeley, Hampshire, England

Coordinates: 51.318°N 0.919°W

- Site of Special Scientific Interest
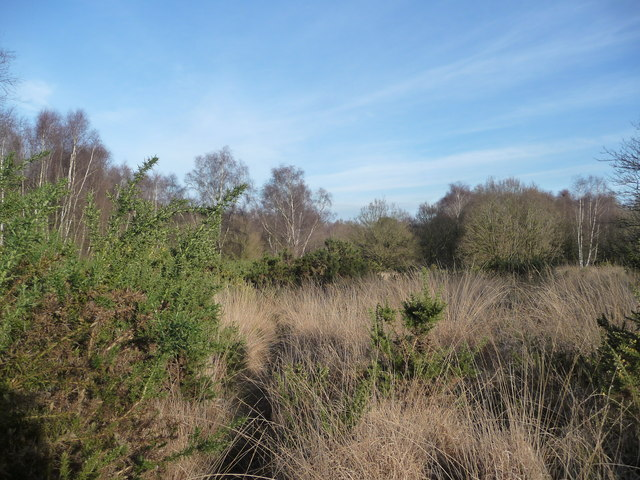
- Location of Hazeley Heath.
- Area of search: Hampshire
- Grid reference: SU 754 582
- Interest: Biological
- Area: 180.8 hectares (447 acres)
- Notification date: 1982
- Location map: Magic Map

Hazeley Heath is a 180.8-hectare (447-acre) biological Site of Special Scientific Interest in Hazeley, west of Farnborough in Hampshire. It is part of Thames Basin Heaths Special Protection Area for the conservation of wild birds.

This large heath has a variety of habitats due to variations in soil, topography and land use. These include areas of acid grassland, bracken, purple moor-grass, dry and wet heath, dense gorse, birch woods and bog.

The site is common land open to the public.
