= Nathaniel Sneyd =

Irish politician and businessman

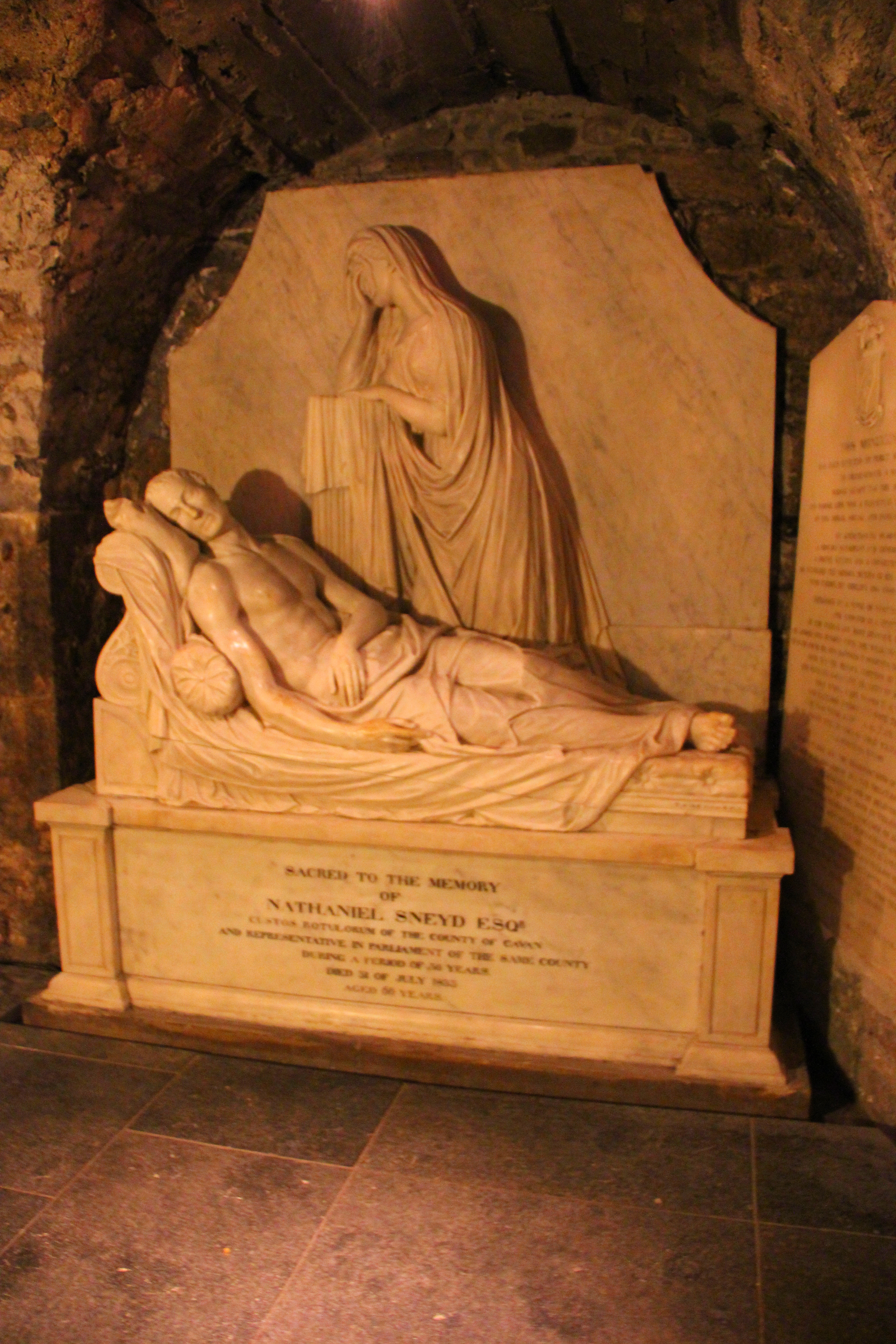
Monument for Nathaniel Sneyd, Christ Church Cathedral, Dublin

Nathaniel Sneyd (c. 1767 – 31 July 1833) was an Irish politician, landowner and businessman. He was a Member of the Parliament of Ireland representing the Carrick constituency from 1794 to 1800 and was High Sheriff of Cavan in 1795.

He briefly represented the County Cavan Parliament of Ireland constituency which was succeeded after the Union with Great Britain in 1801 by the Westminster constituency of County Cavan, which he represented from 1801 until 1826. In general election of 1806 he contested two constituencies for Parliament, winning both and choosing to represent Cavan over Enniskillen.

In Cavan, Sneyd lived in Ballyconnell and owned plantation lands around Bawnboy. From 1800, he was president of the Bawnboy Farming Society, the first founded in County Cavan. In 1801 he was appointed Custos Rotulorum of Cavan.

On 29 July 1833, in Westmoreland Street, Dublin, Nathaniel Sneyd was shot in the head by a madman, John Mason, who had a grudge against the firm of wine merchants Sneyd, French and Barton, where Sneyd was senior partner. Sneyd died of his wounds two days later. He had two memorials, one in Cavan and a life-size neo-classical recumbent effigy in the crypt of Christ Church Cathedral, Dublin. The sculptor Thomas Kirk represented Sneyd lying dead with a female figure weeping over him.

== Family ==
Sneyd was married to Alice Montgomery, the daughter of George Leslie Montgomery MP, of Ballyconnell, County Cavan.

Parliament of Ireland
Preceded by Edward King; Hon. Nathaniel Clements	Member of Parliament for Carrick; 1794–1800; With: Hon. Nathaniel Clements 1794–1798; William Gore 1798–1800	Succeeded by William Gore; Robert Tighe
Preceded by Francis Saunderson; Viscount Maxwell	Member of Parliament for County Cavan; 1800–1801; With: Francis Saunderson	Succeeded by Parliament of the United Kingdom
Parliament of the United Kingdom
Preceded by Parliament of Ireland	Member of Parliament for County Cavan; 1801–1826; With: Francis Saunderson 1801–1806; John Maxwell-Barry 1806–1824; Henry Maxwell 1824–1826	Succeeded by Henry Maxwell; Alexander Saunderson
Honorary titles
Preceded by Thomas Fleming	High Sheriff of Cavan; 1795	Succeeded by John Enery
