= Somerset Maxwell, 8th Baron Farnham =

Irish peer and Member of Parliament

The Rt Hon. Somerset Richard Maxwell, 8th Baron Farnham (18 October 1803 – 4 June 1884), was an Irish peer and Member of Parliament.

He was the son of The Rev. The 6th Baron Farnham and Lady Anne Butler.

From 1839 to 1840, he was a Member of Parliament for County Cavan and in 1844 High Sheriff of Cavan.

He married twice, firstly on 30 May 1839 to Dorothea Pennefather (1824–1861), daughter of the eminent judge Richard Pennefather and his wife Jane Bennett. He married secondly, on 31 May 1864, to Mary Anne Delap (died 1873), daughter of Samuel Delap of Monellan Castle, near The Cross, just outside Killygordon in the east of County Donegal. Samuel Delap married Jane Bennett's sister Susannah, and thus Lord Farnham's two wives were cousins. On his older brother's death, he succeeded as The 8th Baron Farnham on 20 August 1868. Lord Farnham died on 4 June 1884, without issue, and was succeeded by his younger brother, James.

Parliament of the United Kingdom
Preceded by Henry Maxwell; John Young	Member of Parliament for County Cavan; 1839–1840; With: John Young	Succeeded by Henry John Clements; John Young
Peerage of Ireland
Preceded by Henry Maxwell	Baron Farnham; 1868–1884	Succeeded by James Pierce Maxwell
