= Somerset Maxwell, 10th Baron Farnham =

Irish Representative peer and Nova Scotia baronet

Somerset Henry Maxwell
- Born: 7 March 1849
- Died: 22 November 1900 (aged 51)
- Occupations: Irish Representative peer, Nova Scotia baronet.

The Rt Hon. Somerset Henry Maxwell, 10th Baron Farnham (7 March 1849 – 22 November 1900), was an Irish representative peer and a Nova Scotia baronet.

== Biography ==
He was the son of Richard Thomas Maxwell, and grandson of The 6th Baron Farnham. He married Lady Florence Jane Taylour, daughter of The 3rd Marquess of Headfort and Amelia Thompson, on 5 August 1875. He was Captain and Honorary Major of the 4th Battalion of the Princess Victoria's Royal Irish Fusiliers and sometime Lieutenant of the 98th Regiment. In November 1880, he led a relief force of Orangemen from County Cavan to save the harvest of Captain Boycott of Lough Mask House, County Mayo, who was being ostracised by the local Catholic community. This brought about the creation of the Property Defence Association to protect the livelihoods of landowners.

On his uncle James' death, he succeeded on 26 October 1896 as The 10th Baron Farnham and 13th Baronet of Calderwood.

He was appointed High Sheriff of Cavan for 1877 and Lord Lieutenant of Cavan in 1900, but died soon afterwards on 22 November 1900. In his will, Lord Farnham bequeathed the articles in the museum at Farnham in trust to the Royal Dublin Society, and his astronomical telescope in trust for uses in the interest of astronomical science.

Lord Farnham was succeeded by his son Arthur Maxwell, after his eldest son Barry Maxwell had been killed in a cycling accident.

== Notes ==
Peerage of Ireland
Preceded by James Maxwell	Baron Farnham; 1896–1900	Succeeded by Arthur Maxwell
Parliament of the United Kingdom
Preceded by The Earl of Caledon	Representative peer for Ireland; 1898–1900	Succeeded by The Earl of Westmeath
Honorary titles
Preceded by The Earl of Lanesborough	Lord Lieutenant of Cavan; 1900	Succeeded by Edward James Saunderson
