= Henry John Clements =

British politician

Colonel Henry John Clements (16 July 1781 – 12 January 1843) was an Irish Conservative politician.

He was born at Ashfield Lodge in County Cavan, the eldest son of the Rt Hon Henry Theophilus Clements and Catharine Beresford, daughter of John Beresford.

He was appointed High Sheriff of Leitrim for 1804–05 and Sheriff of Cavan for 1814–15. He became a member of parliament for County Leitrim from 1805 to 1818, and County Cavan from 1840 to 1843. He also held the rank of Colonel in the Leitrim militia from 1807 to death.

He married on 21 December 1811 Louisa Stewart (23 November 1778 – 27 April 1850), daughter of James Stewart of Killymoon, County Tyrone. They had the following issue:

1. Elizabeth Catharine Henrietta, born 14 January 1813 in Dublin, died 21 January 1827.
2. Selina, born 23 January 1814 at Killymoon, County Tyrone, died 31 July 1892 at Sidmouth Vicarage, Devon, England – memorial in parish church]; she married on 31 October 1855 to the Rev. Henry George John Clements, Vicar of Sidmouth (born 3 November 1829, died 1913, buried in Sidmouth), son of Lieut-Colonel John Marcus Clements of Glenboy, County Leitrim.
3. Louisa, born 20 January 1816 at Ashfield Lodge, died 17 March 1879 at Exeter, Devon, England.
4. Mary Isabella, born 12 December 1817 at Ashfield Lodge, died 6 August 1890 at Sidmouth, Devon, England.
5. Henry Theophilus, born 24 July 1820, died unknown; he married on 1 December 1868 to Gertrude Caroline Lucy Markham (born 28 September 1842 – died unknown), daughter of the Rev. David Frederick Markham, Canon of Windsor and Rector of Great Horkesley, Essex, England.
6. Catharine, born 3 February 1822 at Ashford Lodge, died 18 September 1830 at Bagnères-de-Bigorre, Hautes-Pyrénées, France.

Parliament of the United Kingdom
Preceded by Nathaniel Clements and Peter La Touche	Member of Parliament for County Leitrim; 1805–1818; With: Peter La Touche 1802–1806; William Gore 1806–1807; John Latouche 1807–1820	Succeeded by John Latouche and Luke White
Preceded by Somerset Richard Maxwell; John Young	Member of Parliament for County Cavan; 1840–1843; With: John Young 1831–1855	Succeeded by James Pierce Maxwell; John Young
