= County Cavan (UK Parliament constituency) =

Parliamentary constituency in Ireland (1801–1885)

- Former county constituency for the House of Commons
- County: County Cavan

1801–1885
- Seats: 2
- Created from: County Cavan
- Replaced by: East Cavan; West Cavan

County Cavan was a parliamentary constituency in Ireland, which from 1801 to 1885 returned two Members of Parliament (MPs) to the House of Commons of the United Kingdom of Great Britain and Ireland.

== Boundaries ==
This constituency comprised the whole of County Cavan.

== Members of Parliament ==
From 1801 to 1885 County Cavan was one constituency with two Members of Parliament, who both represented the whole of the county.

Election	1st Member	1st Party	2nd Member	2nd Party
1801	Francis Saunderson	Whig	Nathaniel Sneyd	Tory
1802	Francis Saunderson	Whig	Nathaniel Sneyd	Tory
1806	John Maxwell-Barry	Tory	Nathaniel Sneyd	Tory
1807	John Maxwell-Barry	Tory	Nathaniel Sneyd	Tory
1812	John Maxwell-Barry	Tory	Nathaniel Sneyd	Tory
1818	John Maxwell-Barry	Tory	Nathaniel Sneyd	Tory
1820	John Maxwell-Barry	Tory	Nathaniel Sneyd	Tory
1824	Henry Maxwell	Tory	Nathaniel Sneyd	Tory
1826	Henry Maxwell	Tory	Alexander Saunderson	Whig
1830	Henry Maxwell	Tory	Alexander Saunderson	Whig
1831	Henry Maxwell	Tory	Sir John Young, Bt.	Tory
1832	Henry Maxwell	Tory	Sir John Young, Bt.	Tory
1835	Henry Maxwell	Conservative	Sir John Young, Bt.	Conservative
1837	Henry Maxwell	Conservative	Sir John Young, Bt.	Conservative
1839	Somerset Maxwell	Conservative	Sir John Young, Bt.	Conservative
1840	Henry John Clements	Conservative	Sir John Young, Bt.	Conservative
1841	Henry John Clements	Conservative	Sir John Young, Bt.	Conservative
1841	Henry John Clements	Conservative	Sir John Young, Bt.	Conservative
1843	James Maxwell	Conservative	Sir John Young, Bt.	Conservative
1847	James Maxwell	Conservative	Sir John Young, Bt.	Peelite
1852	James Maxwell	Conservative	Sir John Young, Bt.	Peelite
1853	James Maxwell	Conservative	Sir John Young, Bt.	Peelite
1855	James Maxwell	Conservative	Robert Burrowes	Conservative
1857	James Maxwell	Conservative	Hugh Annesley	Conservative
1859	James Maxwell	Conservative	Hugh Annesley	Conservative
1865	Edward James Saunderson	Palmerstonian Liberal	Hugh Annesley	Conservative
1869	Edward James Saunderson	Conservative	Hugh Annesley	Conservative
1874	Charles Joseph Fay	Home Rule League	Joseph Biggar	Home Rule League
1880	Charles Joseph Fay	Home Rule League	Joseph Biggar	Home Rule League
1885	constituency abolished: see Cavan East and Cavan West			

== Election results ==
=== Elections in the 1800s ===
Co-option 1 January 1801: Cavan
Party	Candidate	Votes	%	±%
Whig	Francis Saunderson	Unopposed		
Tory	Nathaniel Sneyd	Unopposed		

General Election 1802: Cavan
Party	Candidate	Votes	%	±%
Whig	Francis Saunderson	Unopposed		
Tory	Nathaniel Sneyd	Unopposed		

General Election 1806: Cavan
Party	Candidate	Votes	%	±%
Tory	Nathaniel Sneyd	Unopposed		
Tory	John Maxwell-Barry	Unopposed		

General Election 1807: Cavan
Party	Candidate	Votes	%	±%
Tory	Nathaniel Sneyd	Unopposed		
Tory	John Maxwell-Barry	Unopposed		

=== Elections in the 1810s ===
General Election 1812: Cavan
Party	Candidate	Votes	%	±%
Tory	Nathaniel Sneyd	Unopposed		
Tory	John Maxwell-Barry	Unopposed		

General Election 1818: Cavan
Party	Candidate	Votes	%	±%
Tory	Nathaniel Sneyd	Unopposed		
Tory	John Maxwell-Barry	Unopposed		

=== Elections in the 1820s ===
General Election 1820: Cavan
Party	Candidate	Votes	%	±%
Tory	Nathaniel Sneyd	Unopposed		
Tory	John Maxwell-Barry	Unopposed		

John Maxwell-Barry succeeded as 5th Baron Farnham, causing a by-election.

By-election 24 February 1824: Cavan
Party	Candidate	Votes	%	±%
Tory	Henry Maxwell	Unopposed		

General Election 1826: Cavan
Party	Candidate	Votes	%	±%
Tory	Henry Maxwell	2,854	30.5	N/A
Whig	Alexander Saunderson	2,673	28.6	N/A
	Robert Henry Southwell	1,917	20.5	N/A
	Charles Coote	1,901	20.3	N/A

=== Elections in the 1830s ===
General Election 1830: Cavan
Party	Candidate	Votes	%	±%
Tory	Henry Maxwell	786	51.5	+21.0
Whig	Alexander Saunderson	452	29.6	+1.0
Tory	William Young	287	18.8	
Turnout		879	66.3	
Registered electors		1,325		
Majority		334	21.9	
Tory hold		Swing		
Majority		165	10.8	
Whig hold		Swing		

General Election 1831: Cavan
Party	Candidate	Votes	%	±%
Tory	Henry Maxwell	664	41.3	−10.2
Tory	John Young	614	38.2	+19.4
Whig	Robert Henry Southwell	331	20.6	−9.0
Majority		283	17.6	−4.3
Turnout		c. 805	c. 60.7	c. −5.6
Registered electors		1,325		
Tory hold		Swing	−2.9	
Tory gain from Whig		Swing	+12.0	

General Election 1832: Cavan
Party	Candidate	Votes	%	±%
Tory	Henry Maxwell	Unopposed		
Tory	John Young	Unopposed		
Registered electors		2,248		
Tory hold				
Tory hold				

General Election 1835: Cavan
Party	Candidate	Votes	%	±%
Conservative	Henry Maxwell	Unopposed		
Conservative	John Young	Unopposed		
Registered electors		2,241		
Conservative hold				
Conservative hold				

General Election 1837: Cavan
Party	Candidate	Votes	%	±%
Conservative	Henry Maxwell	Unopposed		
Conservative	John Young	Unopposed		
Registered electors		2,918		
Conservative hold				
Conservative hold				

Henry Maxwell succeeded to the peerage, becoming 7th Baron Farnham and causing a by-election.

By-election, 18 February 1839: Cavan
Party	Candidate	Votes	%	±%
Conservative	Somerset Maxwell	Unopposed		
Conservative hold				

=== Elections in the 1840s ===
Somerset Maxwell resigned, causing a by-election.

By-election, 12 August 1840: Cavan
Party	Candidate	Votes	%	±%
Conservative	Henry John Clements	Unopposed		
Conservative hold				

General Election 1841: Cavan
Party	Candidate	Votes	%	±%
Conservative	Henry John Clements	Unopposed		
Conservative	John Young	Unopposed		
Registered electors		2,050		
Conservative hold				
Conservative hold				

John Young was appointed a Commissioner of the Treasury, requiring a by-election.

By-election, 30 September 1841: Cavan
Party	Candidate	Votes	%	±%
Conservative	John Young	Unopposed		
Conservative hold				

Henry John Clements's death caused a by-election.

By-election, 17 February 1843: Cavan
Party	Candidate	Votes	%	±%
Conservative	James Maxwell	Unopposed		
Conservative hold				

General Election 1847: Cavan
Party	Candidate	Votes	%	±%
Conservative	James Maxwell	Unopposed		
Peelite	John Young	Unopposed		
Registered electors		1,492		
Conservative hold				
Peelite gain from Conservative				

=== Elections in the 1850s ===
General election 1852: Cavan
Party	Candidate	Votes	%	±%
Conservative	James Maxwell	2,252	44.8	N/A
Peelite	John Young	2,049	40.8	N/A
Tenant Rights	Hercules Ellis	727	14.5	New
Turnout		2,514 (est)	65.3	N/A
Registered electors		3,850		
Majority		203	4.0	N/A
Conservative hold		Swing	N/A	
Majority		1,322	26.3	N/A
Peelite hold		Swing	N/A	

John Young was appointed Chief Secretary of Ireland, requiring a by-election.

By-election, 10 January 1853: Cavan
Party	Candidate	Votes	%	±%
Peelite	John Young	Unopposed		
Registered electors		4,909		
Peelite hold				

John Young resigned after being appointed Lord High Commissioner of the Ionian Islands, causing a by-election.

By-election, 13 April 1855: Cavan
Party	Candidate	Votes	%	±%
Conservative	Robert Burrowes	2,163	53.7	+8.9
Whig	Henry George Hughes	1,866	46.3	N/A
Majority		297	7.4	+3.4
Turnout		4,029	82.1	+16.8
Registered electors		4,909		
Conservative gain from Peelite		Swing		

General election 1857: Cavan
Party	Candidate	Votes	%	±%
Conservative	James Maxwell	3,164	47.0	+2.2
Conservative	Hugh Annesley	2,164	32.1	N/A
Radical	Matthew O'Reilly Dease	1,409	20.9	N/A
Majority		755	11.2	+7.2
Turnout		4,073 (est)	72.2 (est)	+6.9
Registered electors		5,638		
Conservative hold		Swing		
Conservative gain from Peelite		Swing		

General election 1859: Cavan
Party	Candidate	Votes	%	±%
Conservative	James Maxwell	Unopposed		
Conservative	Hugh Annesley	Unopposed		
Registered electors		5,989		
Conservative hold				
Conservative hold				

=== Elections in the 1860s ===
General election 1865: Cavan
Party	Candidate	Votes	%	±%
Conservative	Hugh Annesley	Unopposed		
Liberal	Edward James Saunderson	Unopposed		
Registered electors		6,304		
Conservative hold				
Liberal gain from Conservative				

General election 1868: Cavan
Party	Candidate	Votes	%	±%
Conservative	Hugh Annesley	Unopposed		
Liberal	Edward James Saunderson	Unopposed		
Registered electors		6,415		
Conservative hold				
Liberal hold				

=== Elections in the 1870s ===
General election 1874: Cavan
Party	Candidate	Votes	%	±%
Home Rule	Charles Joseph Fay	3,229	37.5	New
Home Rule	Joseph Biggar	3,079	35.7	New
Conservative	Edward James Saunderson	2,310	26.8	N/A
Majority		769	8.9	N/A
Turnout		5,464 (est)	87.8 (est)	N/A
Registered electors		6,225		
Home Rule gain from Conservative		Swing		
Home Rule gain from Liberal		Swing		

=== Elections in the 1880s ===
General election 1880: Cavan
Party	Candidate	Votes	%	±%
Home Rule	Charles Joseph Fay	3,097	36.9	−0.6
Parnellite Home Rule League	Joseph Biggar	3,061	36.5	+0.8
Conservative	Somerset Maxwell	2,233	26.6	−0.2
Majority		828	9.9	+1.0
Turnout		5,330 (est)	87.4 (est)	−0.4
Registered electors		6,096		
Home Rule hold		Swing		
Home Rule hold		Swing		
