= Lord Kitchener =

Lord Kitchener may refer to:

- Earl Kitchener, a title in the Peerage of the United Kingdom
  - Herbert Kitchener, 1st Earl Kitchener (1850–1916), senior British Army officer, colonial administrator, and popular military hero
  - Henry Kitchener, 2nd Earl Kitchener (1846–1937), brother of the 1st Earl Kitchener
  - Henry Kitchener, 3rd Earl Kitchener (1919–2011), grandson of the 2nd Earl Kitchener
- Lord Kitchener (calypsonian) (1922–2000), Calypso music singer born Aldwyn Roberts

== See also ==
- Lord Kitchener Wants You, a British Army recruitment poster in World War I
- I Was Lord Kitchener's Valet, a clothing boutique in 1960s London
- Kitchener (disambiguation)
