= Kitchener (surname) =

Kitchener is a surname, and may refer to:

- Andrew Kitchener (born 1996) is an English rugby union footballer
- Barry Kitchener (1947–2012), English footballer
- Betty Kitchener (born 1951), Australian mental health educator
- Bill Kitchener (born 1946), English footballer
- Caroline Kitchener, American investigative reporter
- Darrell Kitchener (born 1943), Australian mammalian zoologist
- Frederick Kitchener (1871–1948), English cricketer
- Graham Kitchener (born 1989), English rugby union footballer
- Henry Kitchener, 2nd Earl Kitchener (1846–1937), British soldier, brother of the 1st Earl Kitchener
- Henry Kitchener, 3rd Earl Kitchener (1919–2011), grandson of the 2nd Earl Kitchener
- Henry Kitchener (born 1951), British expert in gynaecological oncology
- Herbert Kitchener, 1st Earl Kitchener (1850–1916), British Field Marshal
- Lord Kitchener (calypsonian) (1922–2000), musician from Trinidad and Tobago
- Roy Kitchener (born 1962), United States Navy officer
- Shaun Kitchener, English stage and screenwriter and journalist
- Walter Kitchener (1858–1912), British soldier and colonial administrator, brother of the 1st and 2nd Earls Kitchener
