= Kitchen (disambiguation) =

A kitchen is a room used for the preparation of food.

Kitchen, or The Kitchen, may also refer to:

== Arts and entertainment ==
=== Films ===
- Kitchen (1966 film), an American film
- Kitchen (1997 film), a Hong Kong film
- The Kitchen (1961 film), a British drama
- The Kitchen (2012 film), an American comedy-drama
- The Kitchen (2019 film), an American crime drama
- The Kitchen (2023 film), a British film

=== Television ===
- Kitchen (TV series) or Кухня, a 2012 Russian TV series
- The Kitchen (talk show), a 2014 American cooking-themed talk show

=== Music ===
- The Kitchen (album), a 2013 album by Hieroglyphics
- "Kitchen", a song by Gen Hoshino from Baka no Uta (2010)
- "Kitchen", a song by Kid Cudi from Passion, Pain & Demon Slayin' (2016)
- "Kitchen", a song by SZA from Lana (2024)

=== Other uses in arts and entertainment ===
- Kitchen (novel), a 1988 novel by Japanese author Banana Yoshimoto
- The Kitchen (play), a 1957 play by Arnold Wesker
- The Kitchen (art institution), a performance venue and art space in New York City

== Places ==
=== Communities ===
- Kitchen, Ohio, an unincorporated community in Jackson County
- Kitchen, West Virginia, an unincorporated community in Logan County

=== Restaurants ===
- The Kitchen (California restaurant), a Michelin-starred restaurant in Sacramento, California
- The Kitchen, a South African restaurant owned by Karen Dudley
- The Kitchen, a restaurant chain co-founded by Kimbal Musk

== Other uses ==
- Kitchen (surname), for people named Kitchen
- Kitchen, African American nickname for hair at the nape
- Kitchen, an advertising agency co-founded by Anne Gravingen and Bendik Romstad and now a unit of Leo Burnett Worldwide
- Kitchen, the NATO reporting name for the Soviet/Russian Kh-22 Raduga anti-ship missile
- Kitchen, the Non-volley zone in the game of pickleball
- The Kitchen (Jewish community), a non-denominational Jewish congregation in San Francisco, California

== See also ==
- Kitchen Creek (disambiguation)
- Kitchener (disambiguation)
- Kitchin (disambiguation)
