= Kitchen (surname) =

== Notable people with the surname "Kitchen" include ==
=== A ===
- Anaru Kitchen (born 1984), New Zealand cricketer
- Ann Kitchen, American politician
- Ashley Kitchen (born 1988), English footballer
- Austin Kitchen (born 1997), American baseball player

=== B ===
- Bethuel Kitchen (1812–1895), American politician
- Bill Kitchen (disambiguation), multiple people

=== C ===
- Chris Kitchen (born 1966), British trade union leader
- Curtis Kitchen (born 1964), basketball player

=== D ===
- David Kitchen (born 1953), South African sailor
- Denis Kitchen (born 1946), American cartoonist
- Derek Kitchen (born 1988), American politician
- Derwin Kitchen (born 1986), American basketball player

=== F ===
- Frank Kitchen (c. 1931–1992), English rugby league footballer
- Fred Kitchen (writer) (1890–1969), English writer
- Fred Kitchen (entertainer) (1872–1951), English entertainer

=== G ===
- Garry Kitchen (born 1955), American computer programmer
- Gen Kitchen (Genevieve Victoria Kitchen, born 1995 or 1996), British politician
- George Kitchen (1876–??), English footballer

=== H ===
- Hobie Kitchen (1903–??), Canadian ice hockey player
- Hubert Kitchen (1928–2020), Canadian politician

=== I ===
- Ishmaa'ily Kitchen (born 1988), American football player

=== J ===
- John Kitchen (disambiguation), multiple people
- Joseph Kitchen (1890–1974), English footballer
- Joseph A. Kitchen, American politician
- Josh Kitchen (born 1975), Australian rules footballer
- Julie Kitchen (born 1977), English kick boxer

=== K ===
- Kenneth Kitchen (1932–2025), British biblical scholar

=== L ===
- Lauren Kitchen (born 1990), Australian cyclist

=== M ===
- Martin Kitchen (born 1936), British-Canadian historian
- Martin Kitchen (priest) (born 1947), English priest
- Mervyn Kitchen (born 1940), English cricketer
- Michael Kitchen (born 1948), English actor
- Mike Kitchen (born 1956), Canadian ice hockey player and coach

=== P ===
- Paddy Kitchen (1934–2005), English novelist
- Paul Kitchen (born 1957), American singer-songwriter
- Perry Kitchen (born 1992), American soccer player
- Peter Kitchen (born 1954), English footballer

=== R ===
- Robert Kitchen (born 1957), Canadian politician

=== T ===
- Tella Kitchen (1902–1988), American artist
- Terry Kitchen, American singer-songwriter
- Thomas Edwin Kitchen (1852–1897), English-Canadian politician

=== W ===
- Walter Kitchen (1912–1988), Canadian ice hockey player

== See also ==
- Kitchin, a page for people with the given surname "Kitchin"
- Senator Kitchen (disambiguation), a disambiguation page for Senators surnamed "Kitchen"
