= Katchen =

Katchen is a surname. Notable people with the surname include:

- Jon Katchen (born 1975), American lawyer
- Julius Katchen (1926–1969), American concert pianist

== See also ==
- Kitchen (surname)
