= Two Grey Rooms =

Single by Joni Mitchell

from the album Night Ride Home
- Released: 1991
- Recorded: 1982, 1989
- Genre: Jazz pop
- Length: 3:57
- Label: Geffen
- Songwriter: Joni Mitchell
- Producer: Joni Mitchell

Joni Mitchell singles chronology
"Cool Water" (1988)	"Two Grey Rooms" (1991)	"Got 'til It's Gone" (1997)

"Two Grey Rooms" is a 1991 song written and performed by the Canadian musician Joni Mitchell. The song is the last track on her 1991 album Night Ride Home.

Mitchell wrote a wordless vocal melody and instrumental accompaniment for the song in 1982 during the sessions for her album Wild Things Run Fast. She titled it "Speechless" as lyrical inspiration for the song escaped her until 1989, when she encountered the story of an aristocratic friend of New German Cinema director Rainer Werner Fassbinder, who, amid the repression of Germany's antigay Paragraph 175 laws, was left broken-hearted by a male lover in his youth.

In a 1996 interview with the Los Angeles Times, Mitchell says of the song:

It's a story of obsession ... about this German aristocrat who had a lover in his youth that he never got over. He later finds this man working on a dock and notices the path that the man takes every day to and from work. So the aristocrat gives up his fancy digs and moves to these two shabby gray rooms overlooking this street, just to watch this man walk to and from work. That's a song that shows my songs aren't all self-portraits.

== Video ==
A video for "Two Grey Rooms" was shot with Mitchell as the song’s protagonist set in a barren apartment overlooking a bleak urban landscape. The sepia-and-white clip (perhaps an homage to Fassbinder’s occasional style) was included on Mitchell's 1991 video compilation release Come in from the Cold, in which she also discusses the inspiration for the song.

== Cover versions ==
- Chaka Khan selected Mitchell's recording of "Two Grey Rooms" for the 2005 tribute album Joni Mitchell: Songs Chosen By Her Friends and Fellow Musicians on Starbucks’ Hear Music label.
- "Speechless", the wordless vocal and instrumental bed for "Two Grey Rooms", was released as “Two Grey Rooms (Demo Version)” on 2003’s Joni Mitchell: The Complete Geffen Recordings (disc 1, track 12).
- Canadian pop-jazz singer Lori Cullen covered the song on her 2006 album Calling for Rain.
- Tom Wopat covered the song on his 2009 album Consider It Swung.
- Carol Grimes covered the song on her 2003 album Mother.
- Paul Kitchen covered the song on his 2016 album Wheelhouse.
