= Governor Kitchener =

Governor Kitchener may refer to:

- Herbert Kitchener, 1st Earl Kitchener (1850–1916), Governor-General of the Sudan in 1899
- Walter Kitchener (1858–1912), Governor of Bermuda from 1908 to 1912
