= Kitchener =

Kitchener may refer to:

== People ==
- Kitchener (surname)
- Earl Kitchener, a title in the Peerage of the United Kingdom
- James Kitchener Davies (1902–1952), Welsh poet and playwright

== Places ==
- Kitchener, Ontario, a city in Canada
- Mount Kitchener, a mountain in the Canadian Rockies
- Kitchener's Island, an island in the Nile at Aswan, Egypt
- Kitchener, New South Wales, a town in New South Wales, Australia
- Kitchener Road, a major throughfare of the Singapore CBD

== Sports ==
- Kitchener Dutchmen, a junior ice hockey team based in Kitchener, Ontario, Canada
- Kitchener Rangers, a junior ice hockey team based in Kitchener, Ontario, Canada
- Kitchener Panthers, a minor league baseball team of the inter-county Baseball League based in Kitchener, Ontario
- Kitchener-Waterloo Braves, a junior lacrosse team from Kitchener, Ontario, Canada
- Kitchener–Waterloo Kodiaks a senior lacrosse team from Waterloo, Ontario, Canada
- Kitchener-Waterloo Titans Basketball Club (KW Titans) a National Basketball League of Canada team

== Other ==
- Kitchener's Army, a volunteer army in the First World War
- Kitchener bun, a bun from South Australia, similar to a Berliner
- Kitchener line, a GO Transit railway line in Ontario, Canada

== See also ==
- Kitchen (disambiguation)
