= Royal warrant of precedence =

Warrant issued by the British monarch granting precedence

Example of a Royal Warrant of Precedence (the warrant granting precedence to Elizabeth Gail Barnes-Dowson (sister of the 5th Baron Gorell)

A royal warrant of precedence is a warrant issued by the monarch of the United Kingdom to determine precedence amongst individuals or organisations. The rank of precedence may have an associated courtesy title.

Most warrants of this type are issued when the heir to a title predeceases the current holder of the title. The widow, daughter, or younger son of the deceased will not be entitled to the rank of "wife/daughter/younger son of [rank of the relevant title]" unless such a warrant is granted. The warrants are usually issued to the following effect:

The King/Queen has been pleased to ordain that <name> shall henceforth have, hold and enjoy the title, rank, place, pre-eminence and precedence as the younger son/daughter of a duke/marquess/earl etc. which would have been due to him/her had his/her father, <name>, survived his <e.g. brother>, <name and title>, and thereby succeeded to the said title and dignity of Duke/Marquess/Earl etc. of Somewhere. And to command that the said Royal Concession and Declaration be recorded in His/Her Majesty's College of Arms [and also in His/Her Majesty's Lyon Office if a Scottish title].

Below is a list of such warrants in descending order of rank (note: the Orders of Precedence for males and females are separate from one another):

== Younger son of a duke ==
Date	Warrant in favour of	Sibling of
1817	Henry Howard-Molyneux-Howard	Bernard Howard, 12th Duke of Norfolk
1846	James Charles Plantagenet Murray	George Murray, 6th Duke of Atholl
1858	George Henry Cavendish; Richard Cavendish	William Cavendish, 7th Duke of Devonshire
1859	William Godolphin Osborne; Sydney Godolphin Osborne	George Osborne, 8th Duke of Leeds
1865	Charles Greatheed Bertie Percy	George Percy, 5th Duke of Northumberland
1872	Arthur John Edward Russell; Odo William Leopold Russell	Francis Russell, 9th Duke of Bedford
1880	Henry Cavendish-Bentinck; William Augustus Cavendish-Bentinck; Charles Cavendish-Bentinck	William Cavendish-Bentinck, 6th Duke of Portland
1884	Arthur Charles Wellesley	Henry Wellesley, 3rd Duke of Wellington
1908	Richard Frederick Cavendish; John Spencer Cavendish	Victor Cavendish, 9th Duke of Devonshire
1936	John Percy Samuel FitzRoy	Charles FitzRoy, 10th Duke of Grafton
1963	Robert George Grosvenor	Gerald Grosvenor, 4th Duke of Westminster
1975	Michael Fitzalan-Howard; Martin Fitzalan-Howard; Mark Fitzalan-Howard	Miles Fitzalan-Howard, 17th Duke of Norfolk
1977	Victor Frederick William Cavendish-Bentinck	Ferdinand Cavendish-Bentinck, 8th Duke of Portland

== Younger son of a marquess ==
Date	Warrant in favour of	Sibling of
1809	James O'Brien; Edward O'Brien	William O'Brien, 2nd Marquess of Thomond
1817	Patrick Crichton-Stuart	John Crichton-Stuart, 2nd Marquess of Bute
1831	Frederick FitzClarence; Adolphus FitzClarence; Augustus FitzClarence	N/A (illegitimate child of King William IV)
1836	Douglas Gordon-Hallyburton	George Gordon, 9th Marquess of Huntly
1837	John Johnstone-Douglas; William Robert Keith Douglas	Charles Douglas, 6th Marquess of Queensberry
1846	David Kennedy; Gilbert Kennedy; William Kennedy; Fergus Kennedy; Nigel Kennedy	Archibald Kennedy, 2nd Marquess of Ailsa
1856	George Osborne Townshend	John Townshend, 4th Marquess Townshend
1871	William Frederick Ernest Seymour	Francis Seymour, 5th Marquess of Hertford
1896	George Herbert Loftus	John Loftus, 5th Marquess of Ely
1906	Victor William Paget	Charles Paget, 6th Marquess of Anglesey
1907	Walter John Hervey; Manners William Hervey; Herbert Arthur Robert Hervey	Frederick Hervey, 4th Marquess of Bristol
1917	Leopold Arthur Louis Mountbatten	Alexander Mountbatten, 1st Marquess of Carisbrooke
1917	(Albert) Edward Wilfred, Count Gleichen	N/A (son of Prince Victor of Hohenlohe-Langenburg)
1937	Adam Granville Gordon; Roderic Armyne Gordon; Douglas Claude Alexander Gordon	Douglas Gordon, 12th Marquess of Huntly
1941	John Andrew Christopher Kerr	Peter Kerr, 12th Marquess of Lothian
1953	Ulick Browne	Denis Browne, 10th Marquess of Sligo
1970	Timothy Guy Paulet	Nigel Paulet, 18th Marquess of Winchester
1973	George Robert Tottenham	Charles Tottenham, 8th Marquess of Ely
1977	Desmond Clive Chichester	Dermot Chichester, 7th Marquess of Donegall

== Younger son of an earl ==
Date	Warrant in favour of	Sibling of
1808	Francis Henry Egerton	John Egerton, 7th Earl of Bridgewater
1818	Henry Talbot Leeson	Joseph Leeson, 4th Earl of Milltown
1822	Francis William Grant-Ogilvy	Ludovick Ogilvy-Grant, 5th Earl of Seafield
1832	Henry Hely-Hutchinson; Coote Hely-Hutchinson; George Hely-Hutchinson; Richard Hely-Hutchinson	John Hely-Hutchinson, 3rd Earl of Donoughmore
1833	Henry Duncan	Robert Haldane-Duncan, 1st Earl of Camperdown
1835	George Henry Talbot	John Talbot, 16th Earl of Shrewsbury
1835	Charles Douglas; Edward Gordon Douglas; Arthur James Douglas	George Douglas, 17th Earl of Morton
1835	Thomas Peregrine Courtenay	William Courtenay, 10th Earl of Devon
1836	Henry Reginald Yorke; Eliot Thomas Yorke; Grantham Muntor Yorke	Charles Yorke, 4th Earl of Hardwicke
1837	William John Pym Gore; Annesley Henry Gore; Robert Gore; Charles Alexander Gore	Philip Gore, 4th Earl of Arran
1837	George Henry Cavendish; Richard Cavendish (later younger sons of dukes 1858)	William Cavendish, 2nd Earl of Burlington (later 7th Duke of Devonshire)
1837	Richard Hare; Robert Hare; Henry Hare; Charles Luke Hare	William Hare, 2nd Earl of Listowel
1838	Oliver George Lambart	Frederick Lambart, 8th Earl of Cavan
1839	Charles Pelham Villiers; Edward Ernest Villiers; Henry Montagu Villiers; Augustus Algernon Villiers	George Villiers, 4th Earl of Clarendon
1839	Algernon Henry Champagné Capell; Adolphus Frederick Charles Molyneux Capell	Arthur Capell, 6th Earl of Essex
1840	Felix Thomas Tollemache; Arthur Caesar Tollemache; Hugh Francis Tollemache; Frederick James Tollemache; Algernon Gray Tollemache	Lionel Tollemache, 8th Earl of Dysart
1841	Daniel Heneage Finch-Hatton	George Finch-Hatton, 10th Earl of Winchilsea
1842	Henry Crichton; Samuel Crichton	John Crichton, 3rd Earl Erne
1847	Claude Lyon-Bowes	Thomas Lyon-Bowes, 12th Earl of Strathmore and Kinghorne
1847	Charles Augustus Butler-Danvers; Henry Cavendish Butler-Danvers	George Butler-Danvers, 5th Earl of Lanesborough
1855	John Carnegie; Charles Carnegie	N/A (sons of James Carnegie, 5th Baronet, posthumously recognized as Earl of Southesk)
1856	William George Boyle; Edmund John Boyle	Richard Boyle, 9th Earl of Cork
1857	George Skene Duff	James Duff, 5th Earl Fife
1859	Charles Bailie; Robert Bailie; John Bailie; Thomas Bailie	George Baillie-Hamilton, 10th Earl of Haddington
1861	Moreton William North; Cecil North	Dudley North, 7th Earl of Guilford
1862	Sidney Herbert; William Reginald Herbert; Michael Henry Herbert	George Herbert, 13th Earl of Pembroke
1864	Henry William Caulfeild	James Caulfeild, 3rd Earl of Charlemont
1866	Charles Henry Danvers Butler	John Butler, 6th Earl of Lanesborough
1866	James Augustus Erskine	Walter Erskine, 12th Earl of Kellie
1868	Everard Henry Primrose	Archibald Primrose, 5th Earl of Rosebery
1870	Cecil Ralph Howard	Charles Howard, 5th Earl of Wicklow
1872	William Lowther	Henry Lowther, 3rd Earl of Lonsdale
1873	James Charles Dundas; William Fitzwilliam James Dundas; Cospatrick Thomas Dundas	Lawrence Dundas, 3rd Earl of Zetland (later 1st Marquess of Zetland)
1874	Henry Ramsay; Robert Anderson Ramsay	George Ramsay, 12th Earl of Dalhousie
1880	Henry Colville Needham; Edward Thomas Needham	Francis Needham, 3rd Earl of Kilmorey
1884	Berkeley Lionel Scudamore-Stanhope; William Pitt Scudamore-Stanhope	Henry Scudamore-Stanhope, 9th Earl of Chesterfield
1885	George Thomas Maitland	Frederick Maitland, 13th Earl of Lauderdale
1889	Arthur Edward Dalzell	Robert Dalzell, 11th Earl of Carnwath
1890	John William Harris	Edward Harris, 4th Earl of Malmesbury
1890	Alexander Edmond FitzMaurice	Edmond FitzMaurice, 7th Earl of Orkney
1890	Henry Powell Gore-Langton; Edward Grenville Gore-Langton	William Temple-Gore-Langton, 4th Earl Temple of Stowe
1892	Robert Elphinstone Boyle; Alexander James Boyle	David Boyle, 7th Earl of Glasgow
1893	Randolph de Vere Capell	George Capell, 7th Earl of Essex
1897	Francis James Stuart; Morton Gray Stuart	Edmund Archibald Stuart, 15th Earl of Moray
1897	Louis Guy Scott; Dudley Alexander Charles Scott	Beauchamp Scott, 6th Earl of Clonmell
1898	Robert Julian Orde Jocelyn	William Jocelyn, 6th Earl of Roden
1899	Andrew David Murray; Alan David Murray; Alexander David Murray	William Murray, 5th Earl of Mansfield
1900	Edward James Montagu-Stewart-Wortley; Ralph Granville Montagu-Stewart-Wortley; (Alan) Richard Montagu-Stuart-Wortley	Francis Montagu-Stuart-Wortley-Mackenzie, 2nd Earl of Wharncliffe
1904	Henry Hugh Courtenay; Frederick Leslie Courtenay	Charles Courtenay, 14th Earl of Devon
1918	Charles William Baillie-Hamilton	George Baillie-Hamilton, 12th Earl of Haddington
1923	Montague Charles Eliot; Christian Edward Cornwallis Eliot; Arthur Ernest Henry Eliot; Edward Granville Eliot	Granville Eliot, 7th Earl of St Germans
1925	Charles Brodrick Amyas Bernard	Percy Bernard, 5th Earl of Bandon
1929	Algernon George Mowbray Frederick Howard	Gordon Howard, 5th Earl of Effingham
1930	John Bonynge Coventry	George Coventry, 10th Earl of Coventry
1935	Frederick John Boyle; Reginald Courtenay Boyle	William Boyle, 12th Earl of Cork
1938	Charles Eaton Kitchener	Henry Kitchener, 3rd Earl Kitchener
1941	(Ronald) Stephen Brydges Temple-Gore-Langton	Chandos Temple-Gore-Langton, 6th Earl Temple of Stowe
1953	Christian Victor Charles Herbert	Edward Herbert, 5th Earl of Powis
1953	Patrick Francis Maitland, Master of Lauderdale	Alfred Maitland, 16th Earl of Lauderdale
1954	Anthony George Lowther	James Lowther, 7th Earl of Lonsdale
1962	(Arthur Edward) Peter Needham	Francis Needham, 5th Earl of Kilmorey
1963	Robin Michael Parker; Nigel Geoffrey Parker	John Parker, 6th Earl of Morley
1967	John William Boyle	Patrick Boyle, 13th Earl of Cork
1974	(Michael) Albemarle Bowes-Lyon	Fergus Bowes-Lyon, 17th Earl of Strathmore and Kinghorne
1974	Nicholas John Cunliffe-Lister	David Cunliffe-Lister, 2nd Earl of Swinton
1991	David Mark Herbert; Andrew Clive Herbert	George Herbert, 7th Earl of Powis
1992	Simon Aubrey Robin Hood Hastings-Bass; John Peter Robin Hood Hastings-Bass	William Hastings-Bass, 17th Earl of Huntingdon
1995	Peter Hugh Charles Stanley	Edward Stanley, 19th Earl of Derby
2004	Charles George Yule Balfour	Roderick Balfour, 5th Earl of Balfour
2013	Colin David Carnegy	Patrick Carnegy, 15th Earl of Northesk

== Younger son of a viscount ==
Date	Warrant in favour of	Sibling of
1836	John Petty Ward; Henry Ward	Edward Ward, 3rd Viscount Bangor
1836	Francis Grosvenor Hood	Samuel Hood-Tibbits, 3rd Viscount Hood
1849	George Brodrick; William John Brodrick	Charles Brodrick, 6th Viscount Midleton
1853	John Townshend Boscawen; Edward James Boscawen	Evelyn Boscawen, 6th Viscount Falmouth
1860	William Monk Jervis	Carnegie Jervis, 3rd Viscount St Vincent
1860	Charles Francis Xavier Southwell	Thomas Southwell, 4th Viscount Southwell
1886	Charles Saunders Dundas; William Walter Dundas	Robert Dundas, 5th Viscount Melville
1892	Ralph St Leger; Hugh St Leger	Richard St Leger, 5th Viscount Doneraile
1894	Marcus Piers Francis Caulfeild	James Caulfeild, 7th Viscount Charlemont
1904	Osbert Eustace Vesey; Thomas Eustace Vesey	Yvo Vesey, 5th Viscount de Vesci
1911	Walter James Bosville Chetwynd; Louis Wentworth Packington Chetwynd	Godfrey Chetwynd, 8th Viscount Chetwynd
1934	Alexander Lambert Hood	Samuel Hood, 6th Viscount Hood
1939	(Claude) William Hynman Allenby	Dudley Allenby, 2nd Viscount Allenby
1973	Edmund Savile Monckton-Arundell	William Monckton-Arundell, 10th Viscount Galway

== Younger son of a baron/lord of Parliament ==
Date	Warrant in favour of	Sibling of
1831	Major Jacob Henniker-Major	John Henniker-Major, 3rd Baron Henniker
1831	Charles Francis Norton; James Norton	Thomas Norton, 4th Baron Grantley
1834	Kenelm Somerville; William Somerville	Mark Somerville, 16th Lord Somerville
1835	Alexander Mackay; Donald Hugh Mackay	Eric Mackay, 7th Lord Reay
1835	George Frederick Hotham	Beaumont Hotham, 3rd Baron Hotham
1837	William Almericus de Courcy	John de Courcy, 23rd Baron Kingsale
1837	William Crofton	Edward Crofton, 2nd Baron Crofton
1841	Charles James Trench	Frederick Trench, 2nd Baron Ashtown
1845	Percy Augustus Evans-Freke; Fenton John Evans-Freke; William Charles Evans-Freke	George Evans-Freke, 7th Baron Carbery
1847	Henry Wodehouse	John Wodehouse, 3rd Baron Wodehouse (later 1st Earl of Kimberley)
1848	Charles Samuel Twisleton; Edward Boyd Turner Twisleton	Frederick Twisleton-Wykeham-Fiennes, 10th Baron Saye and Sele
1850	William James Colville	Charles Colville, 10th Lord Colville of Culross (later 1st Viscount Colville of Culross)
1850	Rowland Winn	Charles Allanson-Winn, 3rd Baron Headley
1850	Thomas Orde-Powlett; Amias Charles Orde-Powlett	William Orde-Powlett, 3rd Baron Bolton
1854	David Macdowall Fraser; William Murray Fraser; James Hay Fraser	Alexander Fraser, 18th Lord Saltoun
1855	George Ponsonby Prittie; Francis Sadleir Prittie	Henry Prittie, 3rd Baron Dunalley
1857	Charles James Willoughby; Percival George Willoughby	Henry Willoughby, 8th Baron Middleton
1858	Marmaduke Constable-Maxwell; Henry Constable-Maxwell; Joseph Constable-Maxwell	William Constable-Maxwell, 10th Lord Herries of Terregles
1859	Kenelm Henry Digby	Edward Digby, 9th Baron Digby
1859	Charles Pierrepont D'Arcy Lane-Fox	Sackville Lane-Fox, 12th Baron Conyers
1861	Edward Charles Buller-Elphinstone; John Frederick Buller-Elphinstone; George James Buller-Elphinstone	William Elphinstone, 15th Lord Elphinstone
1862	Robert O'Brien; Henry O'Brien	Lucius O'Brien, 13th Baron Inchiquin
1867	Henry Aylmer	Udolphus Aylmer, 7th Baron Aylmer
1870	Henry Rice; John Talbot Rice	Francis Rice, 5th Baron Dynevor
1870	John Hope Sandilands; Francis Robert Sandilands; Douglas Sandilands	James Sandilands, 12th Baron Torphichen
1870	Francis Spring Rice	Thomas Spring Rice, 2nd Baron Monteagle of Brandon
1871	John Hotham	Charles Hotham, 4th Baron Hotham
1873	Walter Yarde-Buller; Geoffrey Yarde-Buller; Henry Yarde-Buller; Reginald John Yarde-Buller	John Yarde-Buller, 2nd Baron Churston
1875	Henry Frank Sugden; Walter James Sugden	Edward Sugden, 2nd Baron Saint Leonards
1877	Frederick Ernest Charles Byron	George Byron, 9th Baron Byron
1881	Henry Julian Stonor; Edward Alexander Stonor	Francis Stonor, 4th Baron Camoys
1883	Ranulph Edward Montagu Mostyn; Harold Plantagenet Mostyn	Hubert Mostyn, 7th Baron Vaux of Harrowden
1884	Henry Richard Howel Lloyd-Mostyn	Llewelyn Lloyd-Mostyn, 3rd Baron Mostyn
1887	James Ochoncar Forbes	William Forbes-Sempill, 17th Lord Sempill
1887	Thomas Noel Noel-Hill	Richard Henry Noel-Hill, 7th Baron Berwick
1888	John James Thomas Cocks	Philip Cocks, 5th Baron Somers
1889	Thomas John Wynn	William Charles Wynn, 4th Baron Newborough
1889	William Cosby Trench; Sydney Trench	Frederick Trench, 3rd Baron Ashtown
1891	Leonard Holmes à Court; Richard Henry Holmes à Court; Charles Holmes à Court; Herbert Edward Holmes à Court; Alfred Holmes à Court; Henry Worsley Holmes à Court	William Holmes à Court, 3rd Baron Heytesbury
1892	Gilbert Holles Farrer Vane; William Lyonel Vane	Henry Vane, 9th Baron Barnard
1896	Richard Douglas Denman	Thomas Denman, 3rd Baron Denman
1897	Henry Edward Maxwell	Somerset Maxwell, 10th Baron Farnham
1901	Charles Joseph Thaddeus Dormer	Roland Dormer, 13th Baron Dormer
1902	Cecil Henry Law	Edward Law, 5th Baron Ellenborough
1904	John Charles Best; Thomas William Best	George Best, 5th Baron Wynford
1904	Charles John Liddell	Arthur Liddell, 5th Baron Ravensworth
1904	Robert Brooke Campbell Scarlett; Hugh Richard Scarlett; Percy Gerald Scarlett; Leopold Florence Scarlett	Shelley Scarlett, 5th Baron Abinger
1905	Denis Plantagenet Tollemache	Bentley Lyonel John Tollemache, 3rd Baron Tollemache
1905	(William) Gervase Beckett; Rupert Evelyn Beckett	Ernest Beckett, 2nd Baron Grimthorpe
1906	William Spencer Paget Graves; Algernon Sydney George Graves; Adolphus Edward Page Graves; Adrian Edward George Graves	Henry Graves, 5th Baron Graves
1908	Francis Emma Currie	Frederick Hotham, 6th Baron Hotham
1910	Charles John Sackville-West; Bertrand George Sackville-West	Lionel Sackville-West, 3rd Baron Sackville
1913	James Alexander Borthwick; Malcolm Algernon Borthwick	Thomas Borthwick, 1st Baron Whitburgh
1913	Frederic George Morgan	Courtenay Morgan, 3rd Baron Tredegar (later 1st Viscount Tredegar)
1913	Basil John Fizherbert; Edward Stafford Fitzherbert; Thomas Charles Fitzherbert	Francis Fitzherbert-Stafford, 12th Baron Stafford
1917	Robert Disney Leith Alexander	Gervase Alexander, 12th Baron Cobham
1920	Piers Edwin Dutton; Arthur Brandreth Scott Dutton	James Dutton, 6th Baron Sherborne
1921	Henry Kerr Auchmuty Cecil	William Cecil, 3rd Baron Amherst of Hackney
1921	Gavin Campbell	Alistair Campbell, 4th Baron Stratheden and Campbell
1922	Andrew Nicholas Armstrong Vanneck	William Vanneck, 5th Baron Huntingfield
1924	Peter Hotham; John David Hotham	Henry Hotham, 7th Baron Hotham
1929	Henry Rogers Broughton	Urban Huttleston Broughton, 1st Baron Fairhaven
1929	Patrick Robin Gilbert Vanden-Bampde-Johnstone	George Harcourt Vanden-Bampde-Johnstone, 3rd Baron Derwent
1929	Brian Arthur O'Neill; Terence Marne O'Neill	The 3rd Baron O'Neill
1930	David Allan Bethell	Richard Bethell, 4th Baron Westbury
1933	(John) David Fellowes	Ailwyn Fellowes, 3rd Baron de Ramsey
1934	Michael Thomas Henderson; Roderic Harold Dalzell Henderson	Gavin Henderson, 2nd Baron Faringdon
1935	Bryan Bertram Bellew; George Rothe Bellew; Patrick Herbert Bellew	Edward Bellew, 5th Baron Bellew
1937	James Weyland Darling	Robert Darling, 2nd Baron Darling
1940	Ronald Orland Lawrence Kay-Shuttleworth	Richard Kay-Shuttleworth, 2nd Baron Shuttleworth
1941	Peter Waldo Somerset Gough-Calthorpe	Ronald Gough-Calthorpe, 9th Baron Calthorpe
1942	Evelyn Thomas Francis Ralph Fitzherbert	Basil Fitzherbert, 14th Baron Stafford
1942	Terence Eden	Geoffrey Eden, 7th Baron Auckland
1942	(William) David Gibson	Edward Gibson, 3rd Baron Ashbourne
1944	Grey Aldworth Neville	Henry Neville, 9th Baron Braybrooke
1944	Peter de Brissac Dickinson; Hugh Geoffrey Dickinson; David Christopher Dickinson	Richard Dickinson, 2nd Baron Dickinson
1945	Peter Robert Thellusson	Charles Thellusson, 8th Baron Rendlesham
1945	Francis Michael Hepburne-Scott	Henry Hepburne-Scott, 10th Lord Polwarth
1946	William Hereward Charles Rollo	John Rollo, 12th Lord Rollo
1948	Cecil Eustace Irby	Greville Irby, 7th Baron Boston
1950	Richard Augustus Sandys	Arthur Sandys, 6th Baron Sandys
1950	Cailain Douglas Campbell-Gray	Angus Campbell-Gray, 22nd Lord Gray
1951	Christopher Roger Chetwode	Philip Chetwode, 2nd Baron Chetwode
1955	William Howarth Vestey	Samuel Vestey, 3rd Baron Vestey
1958	Arthur Romer Wynn; Charles Watkin Meredith Wynn; Rowland Tempest Beresford Wynn	Robert Wynn, 6th Baron Newborough
1959	Simon Kenlis Maxwell	Barry Maxwell, 12th Baron Farnham
1961	George Christian Darell Jeffreys	Mark Jeffreys, 2nd Baron Jeffreys
1963	Richard Towneley Strachey	The 4th Baron O'Hagan
1964	Peter Charles Baillie	Michael Baillie, 3rd Baron Burton
1967	Michael Mosley	Nicholas Mosley, 3rd Baron Ravensdale
1969	Richard Philip Christopher Nall-Cain; David Michael Anthony Nall-Cain	Charles Nall-Cain, 3rd Baron Brocket
1973	Richard Morgan Oliver Stanley	Thomas Stanley, 8th Baron Stanley of Alderley
1976	Anthony Paul Irby	Gerald Irby, 9th Baron Boston
1983	Adam Mark Haslingden Russell; Daniel Charles Edward Russell	Simon Russell, 3rd Baron Russell of Liverpool
1987	Charles William du Roy de Blicquy Galbraith	Thomas Galbraith, 2nd Baron Strathclyde
1989	Charles Julian Rea	Nicolas Rea, 3rd Baron Rea
1991	Edward Renfric Arundell	John Arundell, 10th Baron Talbot of Malahide
1991	Mark Hugh Gordon Palmer	Adrian Palmer, 4th Baron Palmer
1997	Charles Henry Kenneth Hopkinson	Alisdair Hopkinson, 2nd Baron Colyton
2003	(Ashley) George Ponsonby	Rupert Ponsonby, 7th Baron de Mauley
2007	Richard David Borwick	Jamie Borwick, 5th Baron Borwick
2008	Philip Morton Douglas-Pennant	Simon Douglas-Pennant, 7th Baron Penrhyn (half-brother)
2009	James George Augustus Lumley-Savile; Peter Edward Henry Lumley-Savile; Robin William Matthew Lumley-Savile	John Lumley-Savile, 4th Baron Savile (half-brother)
2015	David Antony Cubitt; Hugo John Cubitt	Mark Cubitt, 5th Baron Ashcombe
2018	Michael Joseph Mosley; Francis Shaun Mosley; Aidan Clifford Mosley; Thomas Kieran Mosley	Daniel Mosley, 4th Baron Ravensdale

== Daughter of a duke ==
Date	Warrant in favour of	Sibling of
1846	Charlotte Augusta Leopoldina Murray; Frances Juliet Maynard	George Murray, 6th Duke of Atholl
1858	Fanny Howard	William Cavendish, 7th Duke of Devonshire
1865	Lady Emily Charlotte Drummond	George Percy, 5th Duke of Northumberland
1880	Ottoline Violet Anne Cavendish-Bentinck	William Cavendish-Bentinck, 6th Duke of Portland
1884	Victoria Alexandrina Hamilton; Mary Angela Scott	Henry Wellesley, 3rd Duke of Wellington
1896	Helena Augusta Charlotte Constance Sidney Douglas-Hamilton; Isabel Frances Ulrica Iris Douglas-Hamilton; Flora Maria Ida Douglas-Hamilton	Alfred Douglas-Hamilton, 13th Duke of Hamilton
1900	Constance Ashley-Cooper, Countess of Shaftesbury; Lady Lettice Mary Elizabeth Grosvenor	Hugh Grosvenor, 2nd Duke of Westminster
1914	Elspeth Angela Campbell	Niall Campbell, 10th Duke of Argyll
1925	Julia Margaret Hulbert; Beatrice Jane Skelton; Gertrude Ward Seymour; Agnes Mary Seymour	Edward Seymour, 16th Duke of Somerset
1931	(Margaret) Jane FitzRoy; Mary Rose FitzRoy	John FitzRoy, 9th Duke of Grafton
1936	Anna Byron, Baroness Byron; Victoria Alexandrina Mabel Seymour; Violet Freddie Wilson	Charles FitzRoy, 10th Duke of Grafton
1947	Princess Katherine of Greece and Denmark	N/A (daughter of Constantine I of Greece)
1954	Dorothy Alice Margaret Augusta Mack	William Grosvenor, 3rd Duke of Westminster
1975	Mariegold Magdalene Jamieson; Miriam Hubbard; Miranda Mary Emmet; Mirabel Magdalene Kelly	Miles Stapleton-Fitzalan-Howard, 17th Duke of Norfolk
1977	Venetia Barbara Cavendish-Bentinck	Ferdinand Cavendish-Bentinck, 8th Duke of Portland
2002	Lucy Helen Pelham; Katharine Mary Watts; Alice Marian Fremantle	Francis Egerton, 7th Duke of Sutherland

== Daughter of a marquess ==
Date	Warrant in favour of	Sibling of
1809	Mary Saurin; Harriet Hoare	William O'Brien, 2nd Marquess of Thomond
1831	Sophia FitzClarence; Mary Fox; Augusta Kennedy-Erskine	N/A (illegitimate child of William IV)
1837	Mary Beckwith; Christian Douglas; Catharine Heron Douglas	Charles Douglas, 6th Marquess of Queensberry
1846	Lady Hannah Eleanor Cathcart	Archibald Kennedy, 2nd Marquess of Ailsa
1856	Audrey Harriett Risdale; Elizabeth Frances Clifford; Jane Hildyard	John Townshend, 4th Marquess Townshend
1871	Emily Charlotte Ormsby-Gore; Matilda Horatia Seymour; Laura, Countess Gleichen	Francis Seymour, 5th Marquess of Hertford
1885	Susan Marian Emma Cholmondeley; Murcia Charlotte Sophia Cholmondeley; Mabel Frances Georgiana Cholmondeley; Eva Harriet Cholmondeley	George Cholmondeley, 4th Marquess of Cholmondeley
1887	Mabel Emily Louisa Brudenell-Bruce	George Brudenell-Bruce, 4th Marquess of Ailesbury
1906	Winifred Constance Hester Chetwynd-Talbot, Viscountess Ingestre; Beatrice Eleanor Herbert	Charles Paget, 6th Marquess of Anglesey
1907	Maria Louisa Helen Welby; Geraldine Mariana Hoare	Frederick Hervey, 4th Marquess of Bristol
1917	Sylvia Gay, Countess Gleichen	N/A (wife of Lord Edward Gleichen)
1917	Countess Feodora Georgina Maud Gleichen; Countess Victoria "Valda" Alice Leopoldina Ada Laura Machell; Countess Helena Emily Gleichen	N/A (sister of Lord Edward Gleichen)
1930	Anne Cecil Kerr; Margaret Mary Kerr; (Gertrude) Minna Butler-Thwing	Philip Kerr, 11th Marquess of Lothian
1940	Margaret Katherine Seymour	Hugh Seymour, 8th Marquess of Hertford
1946	Mary Margaret Elizabeth Myddelton	George Petty-Fitzmaurice, 8th Marquess of Lansdowne
1953	Sheelah Annette Treherne; Noreen Branson	Denis Browne, 10th Marquess of Sligo
1970	Pamela Paulet; Eileen Cecil Theo Fitton	Richard Paulet, 17th Marquess of Winchester
1970	(Angela) Jane Paulet	Nigel Paulet, 18th Marquess of Winchester
1970	Marioth Christina James; Caroline Susan Elizabeth Tyrrell	David Hay, 12th Marquess of Tweeddale
1973	Dora Elizabeth Pink	Charles Tottenham, 8th Marquess of Ely
1992	Caroline Sylvia Borg	Robin Hill, 8th Marquess of Downshire
2003	Angela Isabel Mary Keating; Henrietta Emily Charlotte Purbrick	Christopher Nevill, 6th Marquess of Abergavenny
2022	Ulicia Catherine Edwards	Sebastian Browne, 12th Marquess of Sligo

== Wife of a viscount ==
Date	Warrant in favour of	Deceased husband
1925	Ethel Rose Hood	Maurice Henry Nelson Hood (son of Arthur Hood, 2nd Viscount Bridport)

== Wife of the eldest son of an earl ==
Date	Warrant in favour of	Deceased husband
1945	Pamela Margaret Hore-Ruthven	(Alexander) Patrick Hardinge Hore-Ruthven (son of Alexander Hore-Ruthven, 1st Earl of Gowrie)

== Daughter of an earl ==
Date	Warrant in favour of	Sibling of
1789	Cecil Hamilton	N/A (granddaughter of James Hamilton, 7th Earl of Abercorn)
1808	Amelia Egerton, Lady Hume	John Egerton, 7th Earl of Bridgewater
1813	Henrietta Charlotte, Lady Grey; Susan Clinton; Katherine Stewart; Augusta Charteris	Francis Douglas, 8th Earl of Wemyss
1813	Alice Gordon	George Hamilton-Gordon, 4th Earl of Aberdeen
1813	Catherine Frances Feilding; Mary Anne Feilding; Emily Feilding	William Feilding, 7th Earl of Denbigh
1818	Cecilia Charlotte Leeson	Joseph Leeson, 4th Earl of Milltown
1822	Anne Margaret Grant; Margaret King; Penuel Grant	Ludovick Ogilvy-Grant, 5th Earl of Seafield
1832	Anna Louisa de Burgh; Catherine Henrietta Bernard; Charlotte Sophia Wolfe; Louisa Frances Synge-Hutchinson	John Hely-Hutchinson, 3rd Earl of Donoughmore
1833	Dame Jane Dalrymple-Hamilton; Dame Henrietta Fergusson; Dame Adamina Dalrymple; Mary Dundas	Robert Haldane-Duncan, 1st Earl of Camperdown
1832	Albinia Jane Foster; Hariett Hagerman; Vere Catherine Louisa Cameron	George Hobart-Hampden, 5th Earl of Buckinghamshire
1832	Harriet Garnier; Lady Lucy North; Elizabeth de Grey, Baroness Walsingham	Francis North, 6th Earl of Guilford
1835	Harriet Searle; Charlotte Dillon, Countess of Roscommon; Susan Margaret Talbot	John Talbot, 16th Earl of Shrewsbury
1835	Charlotte Douglas; Elizabeth Emma Ash; Caroline Fox	George Douglas, 17th Earl of Morton
1835	Elizabeth Courtenay; Catherine Berens; Frances Charlotte Bouverie	William Courtenay, 10th Earl of Devon
1836	Agneta Elizabeth Yorke	Charles Yorke, 4th Earl of Hardwicke
1837	Mary Catherine Lindsay; Elizabeth Anne Gore; Emily Jane Gore	Philip Gore, 4th Earl of Arran
1837	Fanny Cavendish (later daughter of a duke 1858)	William Cavendish, 2nd Earl of Burlington (later 7th Duke of Devonshire)
1837	Letitia Aldworth; Katherine Anne Balders	William Hare, 2nd Earl of Listowel
1838	Henrietta Augusta Lambart; Alicia Lambart; Julia Lambart	Frederick Lambart, 8th Earl of Cavan
1839	Maria Theresa Lister	George Villiers, 4th Earl of Clarendon
1839	Horatia Capell; Jane Macloughlin; Marquise Maria de Fontanelle; Amelia Capell	Arthur Capell, 6th Earl of Essex
1840	Catherine Camilla Sinclair; Frances Emily Tollemache; Katharine Octavia Tollemache; Laura Maria Tollemache	Lionel Tollemache, 8th Earl of Dysart
1841	Louisa Anne Hope; Emily Mary Lawrence	George Finch-Hatton, 10th Earl of Winchilsea
1842	Helena Trench	George Perceval, 6th Earl of Egmont
1842	Catherine Sanderson; Hellen Crichton; Charlotte Crichton; Mary Crichton	John Crichton, 3rd Earl Erne
1843	Maria Emma Catherine Ponsonby	George Coventry, 9th Earl of Coventry
1845	Margaret Henrietta Maria Grey	George Grey, 7th Earl of Stamford
1845	Mary Georgiana Pery; Emile Caroline Gray; Cecilia Annabella Repton; Augusta Frederica Pery	William Pery, 2nd Earl of Limerick
1846	Jane Dawson-Damer; Caroline Mary Dawson-Damer; Elizabeth Williamsa Anne Dawson-Damer; Louisa Georgiana Dawson-Damer	Henry Dawson-Damer, 3rd Earl of Portarlington
1847	Frances Lyon-Bowes	Thomas Lyon-Bowes, 12th Earl of Strathmore and Kinghorne
1847	Emily Jane Digby	George Butler-Danvers, 5th Earl of Lanesborough
1849	Mildred Uniacke; Frances Carter; Catherine Perry	Robert Bourke, 5th Earl of Mayo
1853	Lucy Clementina Davis	George Drummond, 5th Earl of Perth
1854	Mary Annette Talbot; Gwendaline Elizabeth Talbot	Bertram Arthur Talbot, 17th Earl of Shrewsbury
1855	Charlotte Carnegie	N/A (daughter of James Carnegie, 5th Baronet, posthumously recognized as Earl of Southesk)
1856	Louisa Caroline Elizabeth Boyle; Mary Emily Boyle	Richard Boyle, 9th Earl of Cork
1857	Frances Charlotte Arabella Hill; Henrietta Susan Beresford L'Estrange; Anne Georgina Milner	Richard Lumley, 9th Earl of Scarbrough
1857	Catherine Ricardo; Louisa Tollemache Brooke	James Duff, 5th Earl Fife
1859	Grisel Bailie	George Baillie-Hamilton, 10th Earl of Haddington
1861	Mary Hamilton; Ramsay Mcdonald; Christian Maule	Fox Maule-Ramsay, 11th Earl of Dalhousie
1861	Flora Mildred North	Dudley North, 7th Earl of Guilford
1862	Mary Catherine Herbert; Elizabeth Maud Herbert; Constance Gladys Herbert	George Herbert, 13th Earl of Pembroke
1864	Margaret Zoe Strong	James Caulfeild, 3rd Earl of Charlemont
1865	Maria Georgiana Julia Fox-Strangways	Henry Fox-Strangways, 5th Earl of Ilchester
1866	Sophia Elizabeth Mary Dumaresq	George Butler-Danvers, 5th Earl of Lanesborough
1866	Fanny Georgina Fitz-Wygram; Emily Rosa Danvers Butler; Harriet Eliza Danvers Butler	John Butler, 6th Earl of Lanesborough
1866	Anne Caroline Haskell	Walter Erskine, 12th Earl of Kellie
1868	Mary Catherine Constance Primrose; Constance Evelyn Wyndham	Archibald Primrose, 5th Earl of Rosebery
1870	Caroline Louisa Howard; Louisa Frances Howard; Alice Mary Howard	Charles Howard, 5th Earl of Wicklow
1872	Eleanor Cecily Clifton; Augusta Mary Noel	Henry Lowther, 3rd Earl of Lonsdale
1873	Harriot Emily Dundas; Mary Dundas; Margaret Matilda Dundas; Charlotte Jane Dundas; Laura Octavia Dundas; Alice Dundas	Lawrence Dundas, 3rd Earl of Zetland (later 1st Marquess of Zetland)
1874	Annie Finlay Ewart	George Ramsay, 12th Earl of Dalhousie
1875	Mary Russell	Charles Perceval, 7th Earl of Egmont
1878	Anne Murray; Caroline Madden; Elizabeth Emily Harper; Louisa Frances Hamilton; Selena Charlotte Clements; Mary Florence Edith Clements	Robert Clements, 4th Earl of Leitrim
1880	Lucy Jane Drury-Lowe; Margaret Littleton; Aline Catherine Mary Needham	Francis Needham, 3rd Earl of Kilmorey
1881	Agnes Mary Manners Tollemache; Agatha Manners Tollemache	William Tollemache, 9th Earl of Dysart
1883	Mary Lumsden; Frances Charlotte Elizabeth Charlesworth; Anna Tredger	Harry Grey, 8th Earl of Stamford
1885	Francis Jemima Young; Eliza Philadelphia Cole; Madeline Erskine Goodeve	John Goodeve-Erskine, Earl of Mar
1886	Catherine Mary Valentia Hobart-Hampden; Albinia Frederica Hobart-Hampden; Isabel Augusta Hobart-Hampden; Henrietta Vere Hobart-Hampden	Sidney Hobart-Hampden-Mercer-Henderson, 7th Earl of Buckinghamshire
1889	Mary Isabella Leith; Charlotte Emma Maud Rolleston	Robert Dalzell, 11th Earl of Carnwath
1889	Cecilia Blanche Horatia Seymour Haygarth; Evelyn Mary Stuart Sutton; Constance Wilhelmina Frances Leslie	Lionel Dawson-Damer, 4th Earl of Portarlington
1890	Constance Catherine Harris; Blanche Harriet Emma Bailie; Florence Lucia Harris; Alice Harris	Edward Harris, 4th Earl of Malmesbury
1890	Isabella Emily Garrett	Edmond FitzMaurice, 7th Earl of Orkney
1890	Mary Jane Skrine; Frances Anne Turner	William Temple-Gore-Langton, 4th Earl Temple of Stowe
1892	Elizabeth Magdalene Graeme Boyle; Mary Helen Boyle; Helen Jane Boyle	David Boyle, 7th Earl of Glasgow
1893	Maud de Vere Capell; Evelyn de Vere Dawnay; Sybill de Vere, Baroness Brassey	George Capell, 7th Earl of Essex
1893	Agnes Alexandrina Anderson	Ponsonby Moore, 9th Earl of Drogheda
1895	Victoria Alexandrina Elizabeth Dawnay	Albert Grey, 4th Earl Grey
1897	Cornelia Truell; Elizabeth Rae	Edmund Archibald Stuart, 15th Earl of Moray
1897	Evelyn Mary Scott; Jessie Louisa Scott; Annie Henrietta Fane	Beauchamp Scott, 6th Earl of Clonmell
1898	Mary Eleanor Leslie; Mildred Emily Leslie; Georgina Leslie	Norman Leslie, 19th Earl of Rothes
1899	Marjorie Louisa Mackenzie; Mabel Emily Murray	William Murray, 5th Earl of Mansfield
1899	Louisa Fanny Matilda Moore; Mary Augusta Georgiana Gilliat	Edward Moore, 6th Earl Mount Cashell
1900	Mary Susan Cayley	Francis Montagu-Stuart-Wortley-Mackenzie, 2nd Earl of Wharncliffe
1902	Laura Mary Sholto Douglas; Mabel Florence Harriett Smith; Theresa Evelyn Vilunza Fletcher	William Wentworth-Fitzwilliam, 7th Earl Fitzwilliam
1904	Amy Evelyn Bertie; Caroline Elizabeth Courtenay	Charles Courtenay, 14th Earl of Devon
1905	Clementina Isabel Maude; Eveline Maude	N/A (granddaughters of Cornwallis Maude, 1st Earl de Montalt)
1910	Mary Emily Dew	Charles Somerset, 6th Earl of Carrick
1916	Sarah Nash; Florence Cecilia Proctor; Katherine Maud Thompson	Walter Annesley, 7th Earl Annesley
1917	Marie Sophie Montagu; Olga Blanche Montagu; Helena Leopoldine Vans Best	George Montagu, 9th Earl of Sandwich
1917	Countess Anastasia de Torby (Zia, Lady Wernher)	N/A (daughter of Grand Duke Michael Mikhailovich of Russia and wife of Harold Augustus Wernher, 3rd Baronet)
1918	Helen Baillie-Hamilton	George Baillie-Hamilton, 12th Earl of Haddington
1920	Delia Mary Hicks Beach	Michael Hicks Beach, 2nd Earl St Aldwyn
1921	Victoria Audrey Beatrice Chetwynd-Talbot; Joan Chetwynd-Talbot	John Chetwynd-Talbot, 21st Earl of Shrewsbury
1923	Blanche Elizabeth Eaton	Granville Eliot, 7th Earl of St Germans
1924	Colina Elwy Hussey; Mary Gwynnedd Campbell; Margaret Alice Cunradi	Charles Campbell, 9th Earl of Breadalbane and Holland
1925	Cynthia Lettice Margaret Bernard	Percy Bernard, 5th Earl of Bandon
1927	Jaquetta Williams; Mabel Stafford Lunn	Henry Northcote, 3rd Earl of Iddesleigh
1928	Wilhelmina Joan Mary FitzClarence	Geoffrey FitzClarence, 5th Earl of Munster
1928	Helen Francis Asquith; Perdita Rose Mary Asquith	Julian Asquith, 2nd Earl of Oxford and Asquith
1928	Alexandra Rose Alice Towneley-Bertie	The 13th Earl of Lindsey and 8th Earl of Abingdon
1930	Helena Ryder, Viscountess Sandon; Peggy Virginia Hoare	George Coventry, 10th Earl of Coventry
1935	Caroline Elizabeth Drummond; Cecilia Georgiana Corbally; Theresa Selina Herbert; Evelyn Blanche Boyle; Geraldine Lilian Boyle	William Boyle, 12th Earl of Cork
1937	(Helen Christina) Joanna Crane	Sholto Douglas, 20th Earl of Morton
1938	Enid Doreen Grace Browne	Edward Scudamore-Stanhope, 12th Earl of Chesterfield
1938	Kenya Kitchener	Henry Kitchener, 3rd Earl Kitchener
1940	Eva Mary Mackirdy; Clare Isma Hartnell	Gervas Pierrepont, 6th Earl Manvers
1941	(Elizabeth) Ann Bathurst	Chandos Temple-Gore-Langton, 6th Earl Temple of Stowe
1942	Angela Milles-Lade; Diana Milles-Lade; Isabel Milles-Lade	George Milles-Lade, 4th Earl Sondes
1943	Lilian Frances Hardinge; Clementine Ivy Metge	Ronald Graham-Toler, 5th Earl of Norbury
1945	Lilian Mary Theodora Austin	Roger Lumley, 11th Earl of Scarbrough
1947	Edith Sybil Foxwell	N/A (niece of Horace Lambart, 11th Earl of Cavan)
1948	Janet Chard; Nicola Marianne Morley; (Margaret) Alison Sinclair; (Euphemia) Meredith Sinclair	James Sinclair, 19th Earl of Caithness
1950	Barbara Joan North; Angela Mary North	Edward North, 9th Earl of Guilford
1951	Doreen Stella Gwinnett	Galbraith Lowry-Corry, 7th Earl of Belmore
1953	Dorothy Marguerite Elizabeth Hepburn-Stuart-Forbes-Trefusis; Phyllis Hedworth Camilla Holt	Edward Herbert, 5th Earl of Powis
1953	(Ella) Mary Blumer	Alfred Maitland, 16th Earl of Lauderdale
1953	Mary Helena Maitland; Anne Priscilla Maitland; Elizabeth Sylvia Maitland	N/A (granddaughters of Ian Maitland, 15th Earl of Lauderdale, and first cousins twice removed of Alfred Maitland, 16th Earl of Lauderdale)
1954	Anne Mary Fane	James Lowther, 7th Earl of Lonsdale
1956	Rosemary Verena Edith Villiers	George Villiers, 7th Earl of Clarendon
1960	(Winifred) Anne Grizel Cochrane	Ian Cochrane, 14th Earl of Dundonald
1961	Elizabeth Georgiana Anson	Patrick Anson, 5th Earl of Lichfield
1962	Frances Mary Elizabeth Ashley-Cooper	Anthony Ashley-Cooper, 10th Earl of Shaftesbury
1962	Mary Esther Constance Combe	Francis Needham, 5th Earl of Kilmorey
1964	Elizabeth Francis	Robert Annesley, 9th Earl Annesley
1967	Elizabeth Theresa Dodd-Noble	Patrick Boyle, 13th Earl of Cork
1967	Margaret Isabel Ayre	James of Mar, 29th Earl of Mar
1969	Elizabeth Maria Nugent; Henrietta Guinness	Benjamin Guinness, 3rd Earl of Iveagh
1971	Jane Rosamond Mary Foljambe	Edward Foljambe, 5th Earl of Liverpool
1972	Jean Douglas Bibby	John Carnegie, 12th Earl of Northesk
1974	Mary Cecilia Colman; Patricia Maud Tetley	Fergus Bowes-Lyon, 17th Earl of Strathmore and Kinghorne
1976	Anne Rhoda Marsham	Michael Marsham, 7th Earl of Romney
1976	Jemima Rose Yorke	Joseph Yorke, 10th Earl of Hardwicke
1977	Diana Merial Moorhouse	Anthony Coke, 6th Earl of Leicester
1980	Rose Deidre Margaret Lauritzen	Rufus Keppel, 10th Earl of Albemarle
1985	Enid Emma Charlotte Curzon	Frederick Curzon, 7th Earl Howe
1985	Katherine Elizabeth Nall-Cain	John Palmer, 4th Earl of Selborne
1986	Helen Moncrieff Motteux	George Hobart-Hampden, 10th Earl of Buckinghamshire
1990	Jean Mary Babington-Smith	John Meade, 7th Earl of Clanwilliam
1991	Elizabeth Barbarina Holden	George Herbert, 7th Earl of Powis
1992	Emma Alice Mary Balding	William Hastings-Bass, 17th Earl of Huntingdon
1995	Lucinda Ruth Bellville; Emma Geraldine Anne Cordingley	Quentin Wallop, 10th Earl of Portsmouth
2000	Sophia Georgiana Child Villiers; Helen Katherine Luisa Child Villiers; Luciana Dorothea Sacha Child Villiers	William Villiers, 10th Earl of Jersey (half-brother of Sophia, brother of others)
2006	Lavinia Macdonald Lockhart; Sarah Ward	Julian Marsham, 8th Earl of Romney
2012	Emma Joy Fellowes (wife of Baron Fellowes of West Stafford (Julian Fellowes))	N/A (niece of Henry Kitchener, 3rd Earl Kitchener)
2013	Daphne Joyce Carnegy	Patrick Carnegy, 15th Earl of Northesk
2019	Violet Jean Eliot; Ruby Radigund Eliot	Albert Eliot, 11th Earl of St Germans

== Wife of a baron ==
Date	Warrant in favour of	Deceased husband
1913	Letitia Mary Borthwick	Thomas Borthwick, 1st Baronet
1920	Gladys Cecil	William Amherst Cecil (son of Mary Cecil, 2nd Baroness Amherst of Hackney)
1921	Alice Susan Campbell	John Beresford Campbell (son of Hallyburton Campbell, 3rd Baron Stratheden and Campbell)
1929	Cara Leland Broughton	Urban Hanlon Broughton
1955	Pamela Helen Fullerton Melba Vestey	William Howarth Vestey (son of Samuel Vestey, 2nd Baron Vestey)

== Daughter of a viscount ==
Date	Warrant in favour of	Sibling of
1834	Emilia Sophia Grant	Henry Cary, 8th Viscount Falkland
1836	Theodosia Osborne; Arabella Edward Wolstenholme; Urania Caroline Meade	Edward Ward, 3rd Viscount Bangor
1836	Caroline Gregory	Samuel Hood-Tibbits, 3rd Viscount Hood
1836	Matilda Sophia Austen; Georgiana Maunsell; Caroline Elizabeth Maunsell	N/A (niece of Borlase Cokayne, 6th Viscount Cullen)
1837	Maria Catherine Barlow; Dame Charlotte Goodricke; Emily Grace Grantham	William Fortescue, 2nd Viscount Clermont
1838	Mary Anne Adams	N/A (niece of Borlase Cokayne, 6th Viscount Cullen)
1843	Louisa Bellamy	Adam Gordon, 11th Viscount of Kenmure
1849	Louisa Scott; Frances Tolley	Charles Brodrick, 6th Viscount Midleton
1853	Frances Somerset; Catherine Bagot; Florence Boscawen; Anne Boscawen; Gertrude Elizabeth Boscawen; Lucy Boscawen	Evelyn Boscawen, 6th Viscount Falmouth
1855	Anne Henrietta Butler; Julia Jemima Wilkinson; Charlotte Butler	Henry Butler, 13th Viscount Mountgarret
1860	Caroline Mary Frances Jervis	Carnegie Jervis, 3rd Viscount St Vincent
1860	Marcella Mary Agnes Southwell; Jane Mary Matilda Fitzgerald; Mary Pauline Southwell; Margaret Mary Southwell	Thomas Southwell, 4th Viscount Southwell
1876	Margaret Letitia de Havilland	Samuel Molesworth, 8th Viscount Molesworth
1886	Edith Anne Reeve; Fanny Emma Reeve; Gertrude Susan Dundas; Louisa Montagu Dundas; Laura Mary Dundas; Blanche Cecil Jane Dundas; Alice Caroline Jebb	Robert Dundas, 5th Viscount Melville
1886	Emma Emilia Ferguson; Selina Catherine Fox; Annie Christiana Cary	Byron Cary, 12th Viscount Falkland
1892	Ethel St Leger; Edith St Leger; Ursule St Leger	Richard St Leger, 5th Viscount Doneraile
1894	Harriet Charlotte Caulfeild	James Caulfeild, 7th Viscount Charlemont
1911	Ida Helen Lizzie Merry; Catherine Adelaide Vickers; Diana Hopetoun Birkin	Godfrey Chetwynd, 8th Viscount Chetwynd
1914	Dorothy Nelson-Ward; Rachel Caulfield	James Caulfeild, 8th Viscount Charlemont
1914	Dorothy Mary Cross; Georgina Marjorie Cross; Katharine Cross; Ellinor Frances Cross	Richard Assheton Cross, 2nd Viscount Cross
1918	Kathleen Georgina Rait	Walter Arbuthnott, 13th Viscount of Arbuthnott
1925	Eileen Sybil Mary Nelson Hood	Rowland Hood, 3rd Viscount Bridport
1928	Elisabeth Noel Monck; Mary Patricia Monck	Henry Monck, 6th Viscount Monck
1930	Magdalen Blanche Gillilan; Rosamond Mary Cary	Richard Curzon, 2nd Viscount Scarsdale
1934	Hilda Ellen Dillon; Margaret Sophia Taylor; Evelina Victoria Mahaffy; Vere Mary Marsden	Arthur Dillon, 18th Viscount Dillon
1945	Sydney Lilian Sebright Freeman; Evelyn Beatrice Byng; Gladys Irene Portsmouth	Arthur Byng, 10th Viscount Torrington
1950	Rosemary Goolden; Jennifer Lowther	N/A (half-aunts of Nicholas Lowther, 2nd Viscount Ullswater)
1951	Kirstin Elizabeth Lowther	Nicholas Lowther, 2nd Viscount Ullswater
1953	(Diana) Bridget Devereux	Robert Devereux, 18th Viscount Hereford
1953	Angela Hargreaves; Rosemary Tennyson-d'Eyncourt	John Goschen, 3rd Viscount Goschen
1973	Rosamond Vere Read	William Monckton-Arundell, 10th Viscount Galway
1980	(Christian) Avril Curzon	Francis Curzon, 3rd Viscount Scarsdale
1988	Lucia Anne Lewis; Jocelyne Allfrey	Francis FitzRoy Newdegate, 3rd Viscount Daventry
1995	Jennifer Smith-Bingham; Diana Harrap	Alastair Akers-Douglas, 4th Viscount Chilston
1996	Helena Mary Bayly; Daphne Montgomery	Robin Bridgeman, 3rd Viscount Bridgeman
2000	Barbara Marie-Louise Constance Gilmour; (Anne) Denise Orange	Richard Berry, 3rd Viscount Kemsley

== Wife of the eldest son of a baron ==
Date	Warrant in favour of	Deceased husband
1917	Evelyn Maud Chaloner	Richard Godolphin Hume Long Chaloner (son of Richard Chaloner, 1st Baron Gisborough)

== Daughter of a baron/lord of Parliament ==
Date	Warrant in favour of	Sibling of
1831	Dame Charlotte Grace Menzies; Caroline Elizabeth Norton; Mary Ellen Norton; William Augusta Ann Norton	Thomas Norton, 4th Baron Grantley
1831	Dame Charlotte Georgiana Bedingfield	George Stafford-Jerningham, 8th Baron Stafford
1834	Mary Digby; Frances Somerville; Julia Valenza Head	Mark Somerville, 16th Lord Somerville
1835	Mary Mackay; Anne Mackay	Eric Mackay, 7th Lord Reay
1837	Catherine Savery de Lisle Beamish	John de Courcy, 23rd Baron Kingsale
1837	Susannah Anne Caulfield; Charlotte Antrobus; Frances Tighe; Sophia Crofton; Frederica McLaughlin	Edward Crofton, 2nd Baron Crofton
1838	Maria King; Henrietta Priscilla Smith	Guy Carleton, 3rd Baron Dorchester
1841	Francis Mary Trench; Emily Sarah Trench; Harriett Rose Trench	Frederick Trench, 2nd Baron Ashtown
1841	Mary Grey Wills	Henry Sandford, 2nd Baron Mount Sandford
1845	Jane Grace Dorothea Bernard	George Evans-Freke, 7th Baron Carbery
1847	Anne Pipon	Robert Rodney, 6th Baron Rodney
1848	Mary Elizabeth Gisborne	Frederick Twisleton-Wykeham-Fiennes, 10th Baron Saye and Sele
1850	Catherine Dorothea Colville; Georgiana Clementina Colville	Charles Colville, 10th Lord Colville of Culross (later 1st Viscount Colville of Culross)
1850	Jane Mary Winn	Charles Allanson-Winn, 3rd Baron Headley
1853	Louisa Townsend	Robert Verney, 17th Baron Willoughby de Broke
1853	Adela Mary Bootle-Wilbraham; Jessy Caroline Bootle-Wilbraham; Edith Bootle-Wilbraham; Rose Bootle-Wilbraham	Edward Bootle-Wilbraham, 2nd Baron Skelmersdale (later 1st Earl of Lathom)
1854	Mary Eleanor Fraser; Elizabeth Forbes; Margaret Eleanora Georgina Evans; Eleonora Alexandrina Fraser; Catherine Thurlow Fraser	Alexander Fraser, 18th Lord Saltoun
1855	Elizabeth Mary Martha Maude; Catherine Charlotte Maberley; Elizabeth Frances Bagwell	Henry Prittie, 3rd Baron Dunalley
1855	Annie Louisa Hamilton; Charlotte Georgiana Talbot	William Ponsonby, 3rd Baron Ponsonby of Imokilly
1857	Emma Machell; Harriet Cassandra Willoughby	Henry Willoughby, 8th Baron Middleton
1857	Sophia Felicite de Rodes; Mary Catherine Curzon	Alfred Curzon, 4th Baron Scarsdale
1858	Theresa Clifford	William Constable-Maxwell, 10th Lord Herries of Terregles
1859	Elizabeth Catherine Lane-Fox; Lora Mary Lane-Fox	Sackville Lane-Fox, 12th Baron Conyers
1860	Anne Elizabeth Bontine	John Elphinstone, 14th Lord Elphinstone
1861	Gertrude Hope; Clementina Fleming Jones; Anna Maria Montgomery; Elizabeth Mary Montgomery	William Elphinstone, 15th Lord Elphinstone
1862	Louisa Elizabeth Eleanor Purdon; Frances Charlotte Ponsonby	William Ponsonby, 4th Baron Ponsonby of Imokilly
1862	Grace O'Brien; Anne Martineau; Harriot Monsell; Katherine Lucia Harris	Lucius O'Brien, 13th Baron Inchiquin
1867	Amelia Sophia Lloyd	Udolphus Aylmer, 7th Baron Aylmer
1870	Charlotte Cameron; Maria Bankes; Lucy Horatia Escott	Francis Rice, 5th Baron Dynevor
1870	Henrietta Anne Bruce	N/A (daughter of Robert Bruce, who died before the attainder barring his claim as Lord Balfour of Burleigh was overturned)
1870	Helen Jane Sandilands	James Sandilands, 12th Baron Torphichen
1870	Aileen Spring Arthur; Lucy Spring Knox; Theodosia Spring Rice; Alice Spring Rice; Frederica Spring Rice; Catherine Ellen Spring Rice; Amy Spring Rice	Thomas Spring Rice, 2nd Baron Monteagle of Brandon
1870	Georgina Harriet Charlotte Windsor-Clive; Henrietta Lucy Windsor-Clive; Mary Agnes Windsor-Clive	Robert Windsor-Clive, 7th Baron Windsor (later 1st Earl of Plymouth)
1870	Marcia Sarah Elizabeth Whittington; Charlotte Anne Smith	Peter Burrell, 4th Baron Gwydyr
1871	Susan Frances Hotham	Charles Hotham, 4th Baron Hotham
1873	Charlotte Mildred Malone; Louisa Maud Greville-Nugent; Eleanor Isabel Yarde-Buller; Bertha Yarde-Buller	John Yarde-Buller, 2nd Baron Churston
1875	Marianne Winifriede Sugden; Emma Frances Mary Sugden; Henrietta Mabel Sugden; Alice Maud Sugden; Blanche Geraldine Sugden; Charlotte Frances Henry Sugden	Edward Sugden, 2nd Baron Saint Leonards
1876	Maria Louisa Carleton	Dudley Carleton, 4th Baron Dorchester
1877	Eva Lucy Mary Byron; Margaret Alice Byron	George Byron, 9th Baron Byron
1881	Julia Caroline Stonor	Francis Stonor, 4th Baron Camoys
1883	Beatrice Violet Mary Mostyn; Gwendolina Hyacinth Roma Mostyn; Myrtle Mabel Muriel Mostyn	Hubert Mostyn, 7th Baron Vaux of Harrowden
1887	Sarah Forbes; Caroline Ann Robberds	William Forbes-Sempill, 17th Lord Sempill
1887	Harriet Maria Selina Noel-Hill; Anne Noel-Hill	Richard Henry Noel-Hill, 7th Baron Berwick
1888	Frances Allen	Philip Cocks, 5th Baron Somers
1889	Mabel Wynn; Dorothy Beatrix Wynn	William Charles Wynn, 4th Baron Newborough
1889	Rose Riversdale Bertie, Lady Norreys; Alice Coralie Glyn	Frederick Glyn, 4th Baron Wolverton
1889	Charlotte Anne Trench; Sarah May Trench	Frederick Trench, 3rd Baron Ashtown
1891	Emily Caroline Holmes à Court; Edith Mary Holmes à Court; Elizabeth Ann Holmes à Court	William Holmes à Court, 3rd Baron Heytesbury
1892	Louisa Henrietta Rennell	Henry Vane, 9th Baron Barnard
1893	Annie Barnewall; Esmina Coppinger; Cecilia Barnewall; Marcella Barnewall; Margaret Barnewall	Charles Barnewall, 18th Baron Trimlestown
1895	Florence Maria Daly; Elinor Gertrude Daly	James Daly, 4th Baron Dunsandle and Clanconal
1896	Anna Maria Heywood	Thomas Denman, 3rd Baron Denman
1897	Sarah Garret; Anna Frances Burrowes	Somerset Maxwell, 10th Baron Farnham
1901	Eveline Mary Stewart; Mary Catherine Rees; Ethel Mary Dormer; Constance Mary Dormer	Rowland John Dormer, 13th Baron Dormer
1901	Mary Selina Noel-Hill	Thomas Henry Noel-Hill, 8th Baron Berwick
1902	Ethel Beatrice Law	Edward Law, 5th Baron Ellenborough
1904	Mary Margaret Philipps; Fanny Gertrude Sophia Best	George Best, 5th Baron Wynford
1904	Ruth Hester Frances Scarlett	Shelley Scarlett, 5th Baron Abinger
1904	Amy Louise Goodfellow; Minnie Emma Susan Savile	John Savile, 2nd Baron Savile
1905	Helen Louisa Beckett	Ernest Beckett, 2nd Baron Grimthorpe
1906	Jane Caroline Florence Marchi; Mabel Mary Blanche Somerset Hay	Henry Graves, 5th Baron Graves
1907	Nan Ino Herbert	Auberon Herbert, 9th Baron Lucas
1910	Mary Elizabeth Tracy; Cecilie Victoria Cunliffe	Lionel Sackville-West, 3rd Baron Sackville
1912	Eleanor Kathleen Salmond; Margery Edith Sugden; Ethel Dorothy Grigg	Frank Sugden, 3rd Baron Saint Leonards
1913	Elinor Colston Brunton; Letitia Margaret Hazell; Sybil Borthwick	Thomas Borthwick, 1st Baron Whitburgh
1913	Mabel Georgiana Crofton; Theresa Diana Chichester	Arthur Crofton, 4th Baron Crofton
1913	Blanche Frances Hoare; Violet Wilhelmina Mundy	Courtenay Morgan, 3rd Baron Tredegar (later 1st Viscount Tredegar)
1913	Helen Margaretta Winn; Stephanie Maryon-Wilson; Margaretta Anne Winn	Rowland Allanson-Winn, 5th Baron Headley
1913	Dame Beatrice Mary Teresa Plowden; Evelyn Mary Walburga Fitzherbert; Maud Mary Josephine Fitzherbert	Francis Fitzherbert-Stafford, 12th Baron Stafford
1917	Mary Isabel Shaw; Muriel Helen Thornely	Gervase Disney Alexander, 15th Baron Cobham
1920	Mildred Caroline Foley	Gerald Foley, 7th Baron Foley
1920	Susan May Calvert; Mabel Honor Clerk	James Dutton, 6th Baron Sherborne
1921	Lucy Anna Maria Storrs; Marion Isabella Tower; Violet Emily Cockayne-Cust; Annette Katherine Wheatley	Adelbert Cust, 5th Baron Brownlow
1921	Jean Campbell	Alaistair Campbell, 4th Baron Stratheden and Campbell
1922	Louisa Medora Hermione Pott; Anne Mary Chaloner Borrett	William Vanneck, 5th Baron Huntingfield
1923	Gladys Foljambe; Dorothy Albreda Bewicke-Copley	Robert Bewicke-Copley, 5th Baron Cromwell
1924	Catherine Muriel Hotham; Eleanor Ethel Hotham; Elizabeth Hotham	Henry Hotham, 7th Baron Hotham
1929	Sibyl Buxton	The 3rd Baron O'Neill
1930	Veronica Wenefryde Nefertari Bethell	Richard Bethell, 4th Baron Westbury
1931	(Ursula) Moyra Lubbock	John Lubbock, 3rd Baron Avebury
1933	Ursula Katharine Hanbury-Tracy	Richard Hanbury-Tracy, 6th Baron Sudeley
1933	Diana Rosamond Broughton	Ailwyn Fellowes, 3rd Baron de Ramsey
1934	Margaret "Peggy" Violet Stockdale	Alexander Henderson, 2nd Baron Faringdon
1935	Guendaline Ada Thomas; Ada Kate Domvile	Edward Bellew, 5th Baron Bellew
1937	Diana Frederica Price; Joan Gifford	Charles Gifford, 5th Baron Gifford
1938	Miriam Louisa Rothschild; Elizabeth Charlotte Rothschild; Kathleen Annie Pannonica	Victor Rothschild, 3rd Baron Rothschild
1938	Daisy Hobson; Ivy Mitchison; Lily Everett	Ernest Denison, 6th Baron Londesborough
1938	Mary Heritage Banbury	Charles Banbury, 2nd Baron Banbury of Southam
1939	Pamela Frances Walpole	Robert Walpole, 9th Baron Walpole
1940	Rosemary Kay-Shuttleworth	Richard Kay-Shuttleworth, 2nd Baron Shuttleworth
1942	Ivy Maude Dawson	Geoffrey Eden, 7th Baron Auckland
1942	Erica Alba Rutland; Kathleen Mary Russell; Elizabeth Marion Richardson	Edward Gibson, 3rd Baron Ashbourne
1943	Pamela Muriel Dorine Colyer	N/A (granddaughter of Hugo Hirst, 1st Baron Hirst)
1944	Magdalene Grace Neville; Evelyn Neville; Mirabel Mary Neville; Audrey Neville; Cicely Neville	Henry Neville, 9th Baron Braybrooke
1945	Cynthia Adeline Elizabeth	Charles Thellusson, 8th Baron Rendlesham
1946	Torfrida Henrietta Louisa Rollo; Gylla Constance Susan MacGregor	John Rollo, 12th Lord Rollo
1946	Rosina Lois Veronica MacNamee	Thomas Touchet-Jesson, 23rd Baron Audley
1947	(Lilian) Anne Grenville Morgan-Grenville; (Caroline) Jane Grenville Morgan-Grenville	Mary Freeman-Grenville, 12th Lady Kinloss
1947	Dorothy Anne Graham; Susan Silence Beauchamp	John North, 13th Baron North
1948	Diana Marie Faith Crofton	Blaise Crofton, 5th Baron Crofton
1948	Caroline Yorke Banner; Mary Dorothy Harmer	Arthur Cocks, 7th Baron Somers
1948	Evelyn Augusta Irby	Greville Irby, 7th Baron Boston
1948	Deborah Mary Thomas; Shirley Joan Drayson; Rachel Kathleen Zvegintzov; Elspeth Lorraine Musson	David Bailey, 4th Baron Glanusk
1949	Rose Maud Talbot	Milo Talbot, 7th Baron Talbot of Malahide
1949	Frances Phoebe Phillimore	Robert Phillimore, 3rd Baron Phillimore
1950	Mary Cassandra Chippindale	Arthur Sandys, 6th Baron Sandys
1950	Fiona Faith Campbell-Gray; Christine Anne Lockhart	Angus Campbell-Gray, 22nd Lord Gray
1951	Sophie Harriet Liddell	Arthur Liddell, 8th Baron Ravensworth
1955	Rose Marian Skinner	Geoffrey Rowley-Conwy, 9th Baron Langford
1957	Monica Noel-Hill	Charles Noel-Hill, 9th Baron Berwick
1959	Sheelin Virginia Maxwell	Barry Maxwell, 12th Baron Farnham
1963	Frances Towneley Strachey; Jane Towneley Strachey	The 4th Baron O'Hagan
1964	Jeryl Marcia Sarah Smith-Ryland	Philip Gurdon, 3rd Baron Cranworth
1964	Judith Evelyn Maud Campbell	Michael Baillie, 3rd Baron Burton
1967	Vivien Elisabeth Adam	Nicholas Mosley
1977	Elaine Barbara Julia Whidborne	Andrew St John, 21st Baron St John of Bletso
1979	Ann Rosemary Hope Newman; Stella Hope Robinson; Lorna Margaret Dorothy Hanley	Gordon Hope-Morley, 3rd Baron Hollenden
1982	Meriel Davina Long	Hugh Edwardes, 8th Baron Kensington
1983	Emma Kiloran Russell; Annabel Tacy Russell; Lucy Leonora Catherine Russell	Simon Russell, 3rd Baron Russell of Liverpool
1984	Joane Mary Sherborne Dutton	Ralph Dutton, 8th Baron Sherborne
1986	Daphne Angela Brazier-Creagh	John Brownlow, 5th Baron Lurgan
1987	Anne Marie Ghislaine du Roy Galbraith	Thomas Galbraith, 2nd Baron Strathclyde
1997	Anna Somers Cocks; Frances Somers Cocks	Philip Somers Cocks, 9th Baron Somers
2007	Judith Patricia O'Hagan	Jamie Borwick, 5th Baron Borwick
2008	Christine Margaret Hermione Scott-Plummer	Mark Bampfyle, 7th Baron Poltimore
2012	Fiona Jane Obert de Thieusies	Conor Myles John O'Brien, 18th Baron Inchiquin
2014	Loelia Dorothé Alexandra Santis	Tyrone Plunket, 9th Baron Plunket
2018	Monica Collett Mosley	Daniel Mosley, 4th Baron Ravensdale
2018	Eleanor Anne Thompson	Richard Ralph Neville, 11th Baron Braybrooke
2021	Elizabeth Gail Barnes-Dowson	John Barnes, 5th Baron Gorell

== Wife of a baronet ==
Date	Warrant in favour of	Deceased husband
1858	Hannah Shepherd Havelock	Henry Havelock
1882	Emily Eliza Adam	William Patrick Adam
1891	Ellen Georgiana Kennard	Coleridge John Kennard
1913	Theodosia Bagot	Josceline FitzRoy Bagot
1920	Maude Winifred Rose	Philip Vivian Rose (son of Philip Rose, 2nd Baronet)
1921	Muriel Rolls Loder	Robert Egerton Loder (son of Edmund Loder, 2nd Baronet)
1922	Editha Ivy Brown	Gordon Hargreaves Brown (son of Alexander Brown, 1st Baronet)
1927	Lilian Throckmorton	Richard Courtenay Brabazon Throckmorton (son of Richard Throckmorton, 10th Baronet)
1939	Mary Grace Hills	John Waller Hills
1948	Barbara Montgomery-Cuninghame	Alexander Montgomery-Cuninghame (son of Thomas Montgomery-Cuninghame, 10th Baronet)
1958	Alice Mary Clifford	George Gilbert Joseph Clifford (nephew of Walter Clifford, 4th Baronet)

== Wife of a knight ==
Date	Warrant in favour of	Deceased husband
1856	Eliza Rosetta Massey Corry	Armar Lowry Corry (KCB)
1856	Elizabeth Boxer	Edward Boxer (KCB)
1856	Caroline Bucknall-Estcourt	James Bucknall Bucknall Estcourt (KCB)
1856	Mary Tylden	William Burton Tylden (KCB)
1856	Katherine Adams	Henry William Adams (KCB)
1856	Sophy Eliza Fox-Strangways	Thomas Fox-Strangways (KCB)
1857	Isabella Neill	James George Smith Neill (KCB)
1870	Charlotte Christiana Sturt	Charles Sturt (KCMG)
1885	Martha Christiana Nottage	George Swan Nottage (Kt)
1886	Mary Elizabeth Cooper	William White Cooper (Kt)
1892	Catherina de Soysa	Charles Henry de Soysa (Kt)
1894	Emma Ellis	Alfred Burdon Ellis (KCB)
1895	Bessie Hawker	George Charles Hawker (Kt)
1898	Anne Adair Skelton	John Skelton (KCB)
1898	Caroline Frances Bond	Edward Augustus Bond (KCB)
1902	Elizabeth Seymour	Horace Seymour (KCB)
1907	Lilla Billson	Alfred Billson (Kt)
1918	Florence Eugenie Barwell Gundry	William Gundry (Kt)
1919	Janet Ferguson Restler	James William Restler (KCB)
1920	Mary Harriet Carey	Bertram Sausmarez Carey (KCIE)
1920	Violet Mary Bickerton Brindley	Harry Samuel Bickerton Brindley (KCB)
1920	Frances Alice Anderson	Francis James Anderson (KCB)
1924	Octavia Jane Nolan	Robert Howard Nolan (KCB)
1928	Harriett Agnes Robinson	James Robinson (Kt)
1929	Else Headlam-Morley	James Wycliffe Headlam-Morley (Kt)
1932	Dorothy Eva Biscoe	Hugh Vincent Biscoe (KCB)
1938	Minona Frances Bourchier	Murray William James Bourchier (Kt)
1938	Beryl Lennox Jarrad	Vivian Everard Donne Jarrad (Kt)
1938	Mary Agnes Dunningham	John Montgomery Dunningham (KCB)
1940	Emily Illenden Fortuna Scott	Ernest Scott (Kt)
1943	Eugenie Devaux	Justin Louis Devaux (Kt)
1944	Margaret Adeline Monroe	James Harvey Monroe (Kt)
1945	Kate Owen Evans	David Owen Evans (Kt)
1980	Alma Hitchock	Alfred Joseph Hitchcock (KBE)
1981	Margaret Eileen Gonzalez Cargill	Ian Peter McGillivray Cargill (Kt)
1982	Barbara Winsome Von Bibra	Donald Dean Von Bibra (Kt)
1982	Laura Ellen Chetwynd	George Roland Chetwynd (Kt)
1988	Dorian Dodge Fisher	Antony George Anson Fisher (Kt)
1991	Ellen Leech	William Charles Leech (Kt)
1992	Mary Elizabeth Stirling	James Frazer Stirling (Kt)
2007	Penelope Jane Stirling	Roderick William Kenneth Stirling (KCVO)
2016	Ramesh Ghiassi Mackay	David John Cameron Mackay (Kt)
