= Kitchin (disambiguation) =

Kitchin may refer to:

- Kitchin (surname)
- The Kitchin, a restaurant in Edinburgh, Scotland, UK
- Kitchin cycle, business cycle of about 40 months long
- SS Claude B. Kitchin, U.S. cargo ship launched in 1945

== See also ==
- Kitchen (disambiguation)
