= Kitchin =

Kitchin is a surname, and may refer to:

- Alexandra Kitchin (1864–1925)
- Alice Kitchin (1873–1950), Australian nurse
- Alvin Paul Kitchin (1908–1983)
- Anthony Kitchin (1471–1563)
- C. H. B. Kitchin (1864–1925)
- Claude Kitchin (1869–1923), member of the US House of Representatives from North Carolina
- David Kitchin (born 1955), judge of the High Court of England and Wales
- Derwin Kitchen (born 1986), basketball player for Ironi Nahariya of the Israeli Basketball Premier League
- George Kitchin (1827–1912), first chancellor of the University of Durham
- Joseph Kitchin (1861–1932)
- Margaret Kitchin (1914–2008), Swiss-born classical pianist, active in the UK
- Musette Satterfield Kitchin (1874–1956)
- Myfanwy Kitchin (1917–2002), British artist
- Rob Kitchin, British geographer
- Tom Kitchin, Scottish chef
- William H. Kitchin (1837–1901)
- William Walton Kitchin (1866–1924)

== See also ==
- Lord Kitchin
- Kitchen (surname)
- Kitchin House
