= Earl Kitchener =

British peer and military leader

Earldom of Kitchener of Khartoum and of Broome
- Blazon: Arms: Gules a Chevron Argent surmounted by another Azure between three Bustards proper on the centre chief point a Bezant.; Crests: A Stag's Head erased transfixed through the neck by an Arrow in bend point to the dexter all proper and between the attires a Horseshoe Or.; Supporters: Dexter: a Camel proper, bridle, trappings and line pendent, reflexed over the back Gules, gorged with a Collar Or, suspended therefrom an Escutcheon paly bendy Azure and Ermine, a Canton of the last, charged with a Portcullis Or; Sinister: a Gnu proper, gorged as the dexter, suspended therefrom an Escutcheon Ermine charged with a Chevron engrailed Vert, thereon four Horse-Shoes, also Or.
- Creation date: 27 July 1914
- Created by: King George V
- Peerage: Peerage of the United Kingdom
- First holder: Horatio Herbert Kitchener, 1st Earl Kitchener
- Last holder: Henry Herbert Kitchener, 3rd Earl Kitchener
- Remainder to: Special remainder (see main text)
- Subsidiary titles: Viscount Kitchener of Khartoum
- Status: Extinct
- Extinction date: 16 December 2011
- Seat: Westergate Wood
- Motto: THOROUGH

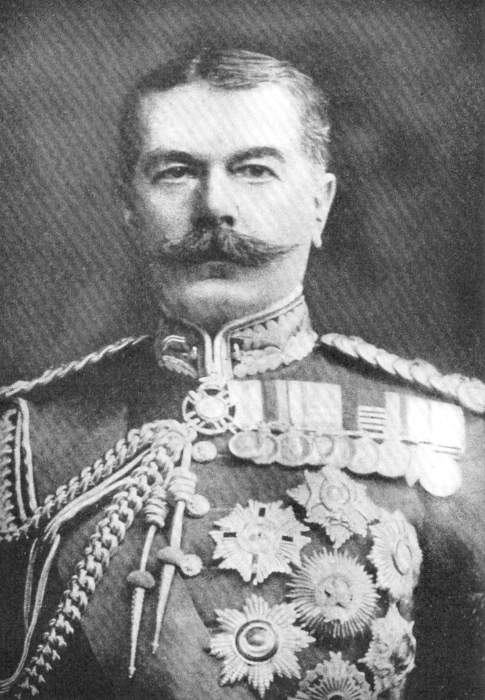
Herbert Kitchener, 1st Earl Kitchener

Earl Kitchener, of Khartoum and of Broome in the County of Kent, was a title in the Peerage of the United Kingdom. It was created in 1914 for the famous officer Field Marshal Herbert Kitchener, 1st Viscount Kitchener of Khartoum. (Note: Note: When sworn in as Privy Counsellor, Herbert Kitchener was named in the official London Gazette as Earl Kitchener (and not Earl Kitchener of Khartoum). See: London Gazette: no. 28863. p. 6171. 4 August 1914. Retrieved 2011-08-18) He had already been created Baron Kitchener of Khartoum, and of Aspall in the County of Suffolk, in 1898, Viscount Kitchener of Khartoum, and of the Vaal River in the Transvaal Colony, and of Aspall in the County of Suffolk, in 1902, and was made Baron Denton, of Denton in the County of Kent, and Viscount Broome, of Broome in the County of Kent, at the same time he was granted the earldom. These titles were also in the Peerage of the United Kingdom.

The barony of 1898 was created with normal remainder to the heirs male of his body. However, all the other titles (those of 1902 and 1914) were created with remainder to

1. the heirs male of his body, failing which to
2. his first daughter and the heirs male of her body, failing which to
3. his other daughters and the heirs male of their bodies, failing which to
4. his elder brother Colonel Henry Kitchener and the heirs male of his body, failing which to
5. his youngest brother Lieutenant-General Sir Walter Kitchener (who was alive at the time of the 1902 creation but deceased at the time of the 1914 creations) and the heirs male of his body.

A third brother, Arthur Kitchener (also alive at the time of the 1902 creation but deceased at the time of the 1914 creations), was not included in either special remainder.

The first earl died unmarried and childless in 1916, which resulted in the extinction of the barony created in 1898. However, he was succeeded in the other titles under the special remainder by his elder brother, Colonel Henry Kitchener, as second earl. His only son, Henry, Viscount Broome, predeceased him, and so he was succeeded by his grandson, also Henry, Viscount Broome, as third earl. The third earl died unmarried and childless in 2011. His younger brother, the Hon. Charles Kitchener, had died in 1982, and the line of Lieutenant-General Sir Walter Kitchener had failed on the death of his younger son, Squadron Leader Henry Kitchener, in 1984. The titles therefore became extinct.

The Hon. Charles Kitchener, brother of the third earl, had one daughter, Emma Kitchener (born 1963), who on the third earl's death became the first earl's heir general. She is a lady-in-waiting to Princess Michael of Kent and is married to the actor, screenwriter, film director and novelist Lord Fellowes. Fellowes publicly expressed his dissatisfaction that the proposals to change the rules of royal succession were not extended to peerages, which would have allowed his wife to succeed as 4th Countess on her uncle's death. On 9 May 2012 the Queen issued a Royal Warrant of Precedence allowing Lady Fellowes to enjoy the same rank and title of the daughter of an earl, as if her late father had survived his brother and therefore succeeded to the title.

The family seat was Westergate Wood, near Arundel, Sussex.

== Earls Kitchener (1914) ==
- Horatio Herbert Kitchener, 1st Earl Kitchener (1850–1916)
- Henry Elliott Chevallier Kitchener, 2nd Earl Kitchener (1846–1937)
  - Henry Franklin Chevallier Kitchener, Viscount Broome (1878–1928)
    - Henry Herbert Kitchener, 3rd Earl Kitchener (1919–2011)
