= Kitchen Creek =

Kitchen Creek is the name of several streams in the United States:

- Kitchen Creek (Pennsylvania), a tributary of Huntington Creek in Luzerne County
- Kitchen Creek (West Virginia), a tributary of Greenbrier Creek
- Kitchen Creek (California), a tributary of Cottonwood Creek in San Diego County

== See also ==
- Kitchen Run
