= Adelphi, Ohio =

- Village
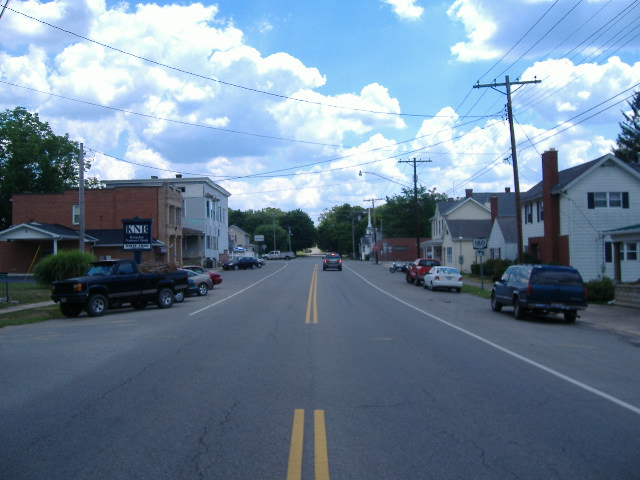
- Along State Route 180

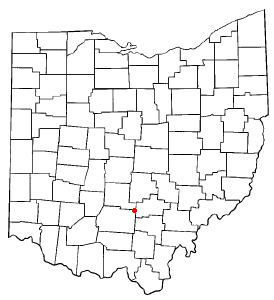
- Location of Adelphi, Ohio

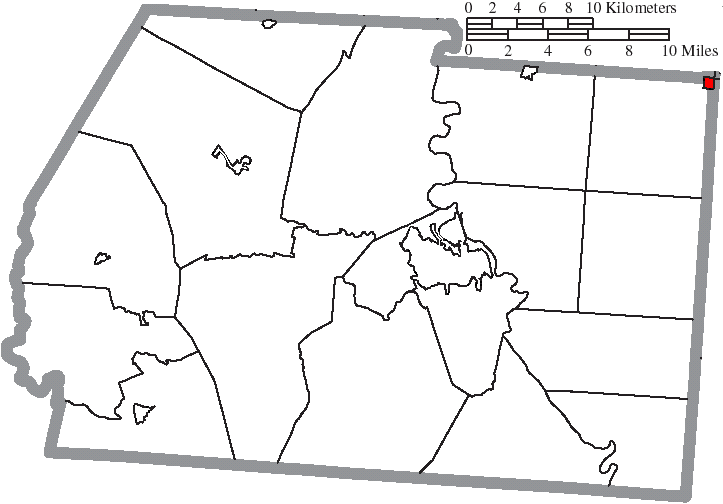
- Location of Adelphi in Ross County
- Coordinates: 39°27′49″N 82°44′50″W
- Country: United States
- State: Ohio
- County: Ross

Area
  - Total: 0.27 sq mi (0.71 km^{2})
  - Land: 0.27 sq mi (0.71 km^{2})
  - Water: 0 sq mi (0.00 km^{2})
- Elevation: 846 ft (258 m)

Population (2020)
  - Total: 322
  - Estimate (2023): 316
  - Density: 1,175.7/sq mi (453.95/km^{2})
- Time zone: UTC-5 (Eastern (EST))
  - Summer (DST): UTC-4 (EDT)
- ZIP code: 43101
- Area code: 740
- FIPS code: 39-00450
- GNIS feature ID: 2397915
- Website: adelphiohio.com

Adelphi (/əˈdɛlfaɪ/ ə-DEL-fy) is a village in Ross County, Ohio, United States. The population was 322 at the 2020 census.

== History ==
Adelphi was laid out in 1804 by two brothers, and named after the Greek word for "brothers". Adelphi was incorporated as a village in 1838.

== Geography ==
According to the United States Census Bureau, the village has a total area of 0.27 square miles (0.70 km^{2}), all land.

== Demographics ==
Historical population
Census	Pop.	Note	%±
1820	132		—
1830	247		87.1%
1840	250		1.2%
1850	412		64.8%
1860	378		−8.3%
1870	417		10.3%
1880	469		12.5%
1890	489		4.3%
1900	516		5.5%
1910	407		−21.1%
1920	329		−19.2%
1930	412		25.2%
1940	414		0.5%
1950	392		−5.3%
1960	441		12.5%
1970	455		3.2%
1980	472		3.7%
1990	398		−15.7%
2000	371		−6.8%
2010	380		2.4%
2020	322		−15.3%
2023 (est.)	316	▼	−1.9%
U.S. Decennial Census

=== 2010 census ===
As of the census of 2010, there were 380 people, 154 households, and 100 families living in the village. The population density was 1,407.4 inhabitants per square mile (543.4/km^{2}). There were 175 housing units at an average density of 648.1 per square mile (250.2/km^{2}). The racial makeup of the village was 95.0% White, 1.6% African American, 0.3% Asian, and 3.2% from two or more races.

There were 154 households, of which 34.4% had children under the age of 18 living with them, 47.4% were married couples living together, 11.7% had a female householder with no husband present, 5.8% had a male householder with no wife present, and 35.1% were non-families. 29.2% of all households were made up of individuals, and 11.6% had someone living alone who was 65 years of age or older. The average household size was 2.47 and the average family size was 3.00.

The median age in the village was 39 years. 26.8% of residents were under the age of 18; 6.3% were between the ages of 18 and 24; 25.5% were from 25 to 44; 26.1% were from 45 to 64; and 15.3% were 65 years of age or older. The gender makeup of the village was 51.1% male and 48.9% female.

=== 2000 census ===
As of the census of 2000, there were 371 people, 156 households, and 111 families living in the village. The population density was 1,343.3 inhabitants per square mile (518.7/km^{2}). There were 176 housing units at an average density of 637.3 per square mile (246.1/km^{2}). The racial makeup of the village was 96.23% White, 2.96% African American, and 0.81% from two or more races. Hispanic or Latino of any race were 0.54% of the population.

There were 156 households, out of which 28.2% had children under the age of 18 living with them, 53.8% were married couples living together, 12.2% had a female householder with no husband present, and 28.8% were non-families. 26.3% of all households were made up of individuals, and 12.2% had someone living alone who was 65 years of age or older. The average household size was 2.38 and the average family size was 2.83.

In the village, the population was spread out, with 22.4% under the age of 18, 9.7% from 18 to 24, 28.8% from 25 to 44, 25.3% from 45 to 64, and 13.7% who were 65 years of age or older. The median age was 38 years. For every 100 females there were 101.6 males. For every 100 females age 18 and over, there were 97.3 males.

The median income for a household in the village was $33,125, and the median income for a family was $37,143. Males had a median income of $30,250 versus $24,375 for females. The per capita income for the village was $14,657. About 13.2% of families and 13.6% of the population were below the poverty line, including 18.4% of those under age 18 and 23.3% of those age 65 or over.

== Notable people ==
- Tella Kitchen (1902–1988), folk art painter
- John Purdue (1802–1876), founding benefactor of Purdue University
