= William White Cooper =

English surgeon-oculist

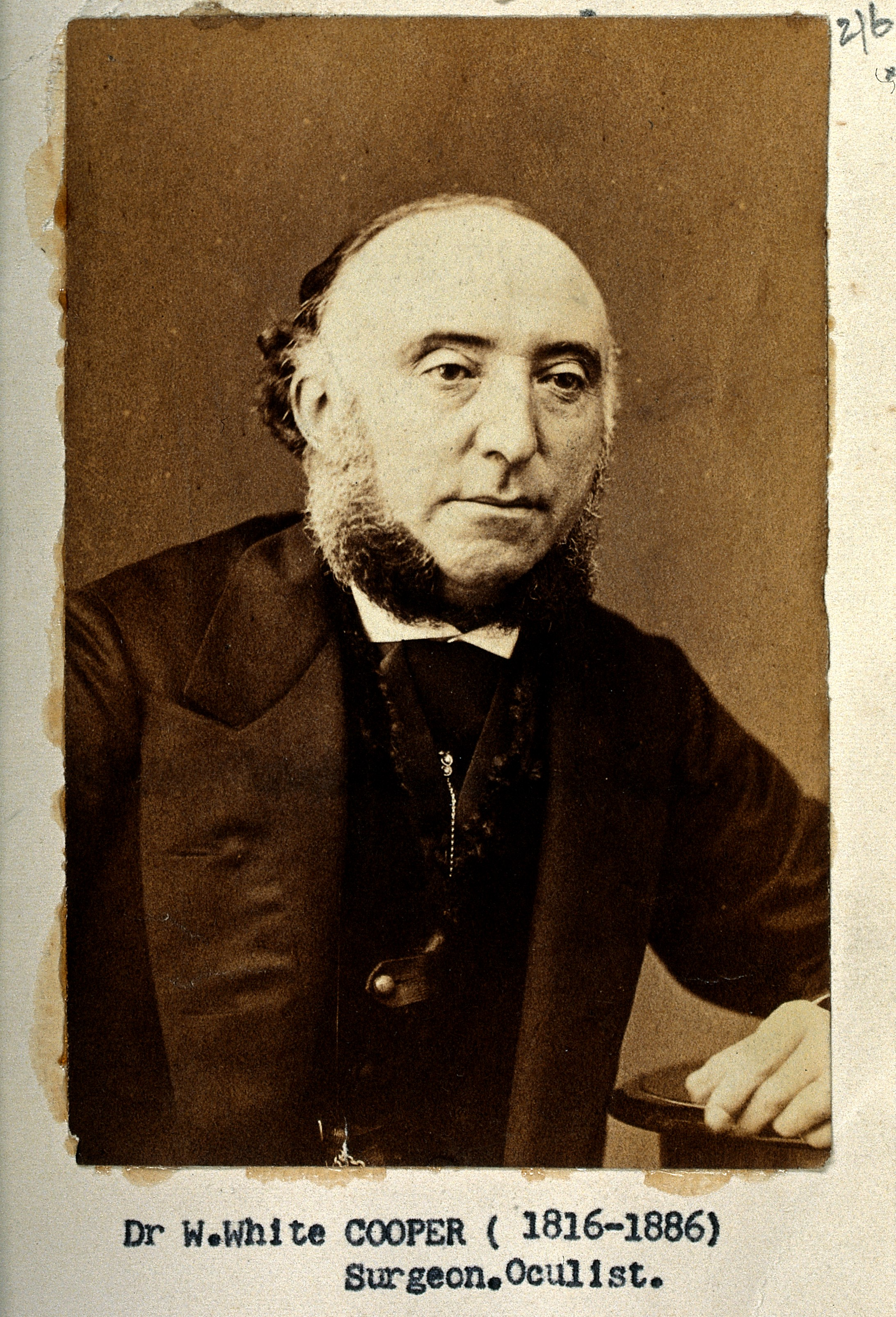
- Born: 17 November 1816; Holt, Wiltshire, England
- Died: 1 June 1886 (aged 69)
- Occupation: Surgeon-oculist

William White Cooper (17 November 1816 – 1 June 1886) was an English surgeon-oculist.

== Biography ==
Cooper was born at Holt in Wiltshire on 17 November 1816. After studying at St. Bartholomew's Hospital, London, he became M.R.C.S. in December 1838, and F.R.C.S. in 1845. His notes of Professor Owen's lectures at the College of Surgeons were published after revision, under the title of ‘Lectures in the Comparative Anatomy and Physiology of the Invertebrate Animals,’ in 1843. Becoming associated with John Dalrymple, the ophthalmic surgeon, Cooper followed in his footsteps and gained a large practice. He was one of the original staff of the North London Eye Institution, and subsequently ophthalmic surgeon to St. Mary's Hospital, Paddington. He was a careful, steady, and neat operator, and judicious and painstaking in treatment. In 1859 he was appointed surgeon-oculist in ordinary to Queen Victoria, whose sincere regard he gained (Court Circular, 2 June 1886). It was announced on 29 May 1886 that he was to be knighted, but on the same day he was seized with acute pneumonia, of which he died on 1 June 1886. He was buried on the eastern side of Highgate Cemetery.

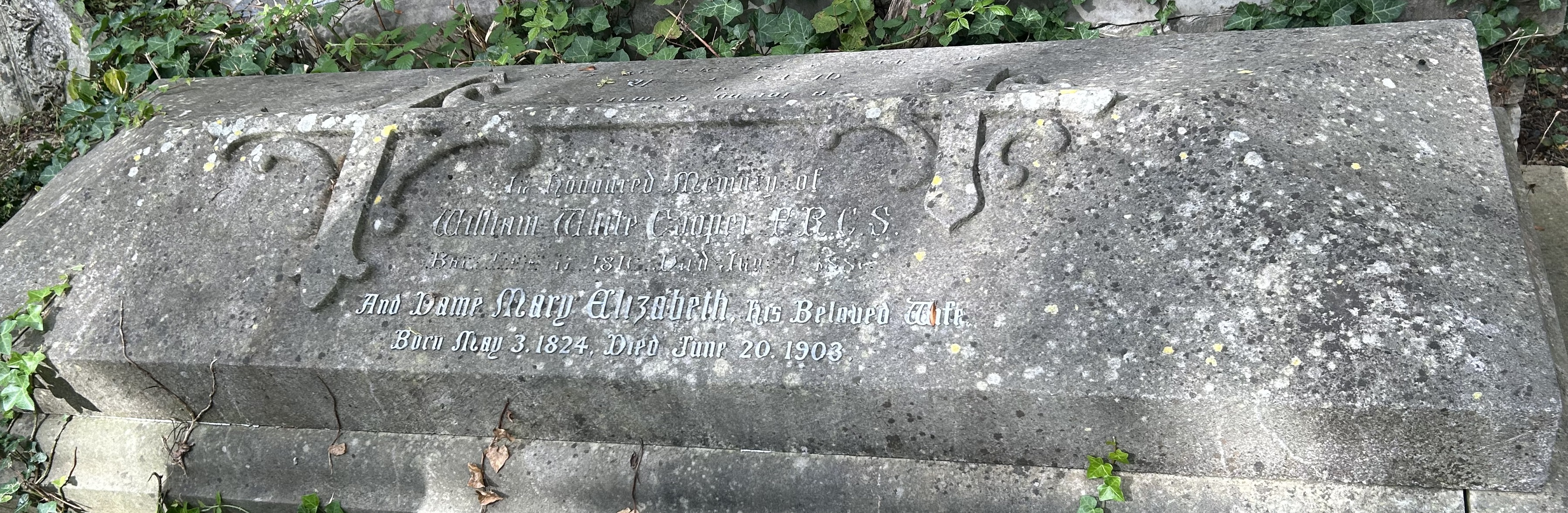
Grave of Sir William White Cooper in Highgate Cemetery

Cooper's personal character was most estimable, combining kindliness, sincerity, and simplicity with much energy. He wrote an ‘Invalid's Guide to Madeira,’ 1840; ‘Practical Remarks on Near Sight, Aged Sight, and Impaired Vision,’ 1847, second edition 1853; ‘Observations on Conical Cornea,’ 1850; ‘On Wounds and Injuries of the Eye,’ 1859. He also published in 1852 a volume of ‘Zoological Notes and Anecdotes’ under the pseudonym ‘Sestertius Holt,’ of which a second edition appeared in 1861 under the title ‘Traits and Anecdotes of Animals.’ It was illustrated with full-page plates by Wolf.
