= Senator Kitchen =

Senator Kitchen may refer to:

- Bethuel Kitchen (1812–1895), West Virginia State Senate
- Derek Kitchen (born 1988), Utah State Senate
- Shirley Kitchen (1946–2026), Pennsylvania State Senate

== See also ==
- Wes Kitchens (born 1989), Alabama State Senate
