= Kitchen, West Virginia =

- Unincorporated community
- Location within West Virginia Location within the United States
- Coordinates: 37°58′53″N 82°2′3″W
- Country: United States
- State: West Virginia
- County: Logan
- Elevation: 643 ft (196 m)
- Time zone: UTC-5 (Eastern (EST))
  - Summer (DST): UTC-4 (EDT)
- GNIS ID: 1541252

Kitchen is an unincorporated community in Logan County, West Virginia, United States. Their post office has been closed.
