= Coralie Glyn =

English humanitarian and author (1866 – 1928)

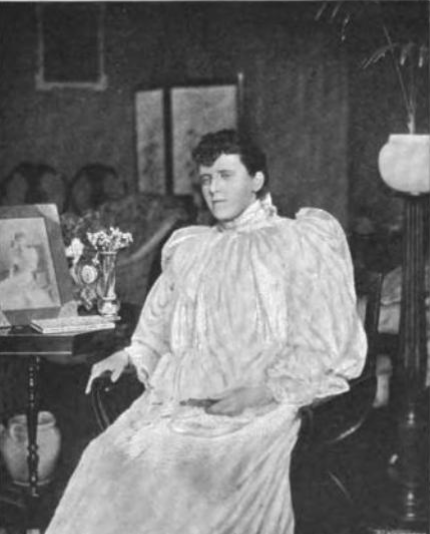
Coralie Glyn in 1892.

Coralie Glyn (1866 – 1928) was an English humanitarian dedicated to improving conditions for working women. She was also an author of speculative fiction novels.

== Early life and family ==
She was born Alice Coralie Glyn in 1866, the daughter of Vice-Admiral the Hon. Henry Carr Glyn and his wife Rose, née Mahony. Her sister was Rose Riversdale Glyn, later Lady Norreys, and she had two brothers, the third and fourth barons Wolverton.

== Writing and humanitarian work ==
Considered 'one of the newest of new women' with 'most advanced views,' she wrote on women’s rights in many contributions to periodicals, notably 'Nature’s Nuns: A Reply to Grant Allen' on the subject of marriage and motherhood. Her 1896 novel A Woman of To-Morrow imagines a world of 1996 where women have the vote and are able to become barristers.

A member of the Pioneer Club, in 1898 she founded the Camelot Club, a club with no entry fee which provided a meeting place and excursions for working women.

Her will provided the resources for fourteen bungalows to be built in Welwyn Garden City for the free use of working-class widows. This legacy was still functioning over a century later as the charity Alice Coralie Glyn Homes.

== Personal life ==
Coralie was a keen cyclist.

Coralie married Henry Lister Beaumont on 1 April 1889 at Paddington Register Office. She filed for divorce on 12 April 1890 but, following the intervention of the Queen's Proctor, the divorce was not granted.

She later entered into an engagement with the inventor St George Lane Fox in 1892, but they never married.
