= Frederick Kitchener =

English cricketer

Personal information
- Full name: Frederick George Kitchener
- Born: 5 July 1871; Hartley Row, Hampshire, England
- Died: 25 May 1948 (aged 76); East Boldon, County Durham, England
- Batting: Right-handed
- Bowling: Right-arm fast-medium

Domestic team information
- Years: Team
- 1896–1903: Hampshire

Career statistics
Competition	First-class
Matches	13
Runs scored	80
Batting average	5.00
100s/50s	–/–
Top score	16
Balls bowled	1,440
Wickets	28
Bowling average	22.50
5 wickets in innings	2
10 wickets in match	–
Best bowling	6/59
Catches/stumpings	6/–
- Source: Cricinfo, 22 January 2010

Frederick George Kitchener (5 July 1871 – 25 May 1948) was an English first-class cricketer.

The son of G. F. Kitchener, he was born in July 1871 at Hartley Row, Hampshire. A right-arm fast-medium bowler, Kitchener had cricket trials with Hampshire in 1896, with him making his debut in first-class cricket in that same season against Sussex at Southampton in the County Championship. He played first-class cricket for Hampshire intermittently until 1903, making thirteen appearances, the majority (10) of which came in 1896 and 1897. Playing as a bowler in the Hampshire side, he took 28 wickets at an average of 22.50; he took two five wicket hauls, with best figures of 6 for 59 against Derbyshire in 1896.

As a professional cricketer, Kitchener also played club cricket in the Liverpool and District Cricket Competition for Sefton from 1902 to 1906, before playing in Scotland for Grange Cricket Club in 1908 and 1909. He later moved to East Boldon in County Durham, where he played for Boldon Cricket Club. Kitchener died there in May 1948, aged 76.
