= Myfanwy Kitchin =

British artist (1917-2002)

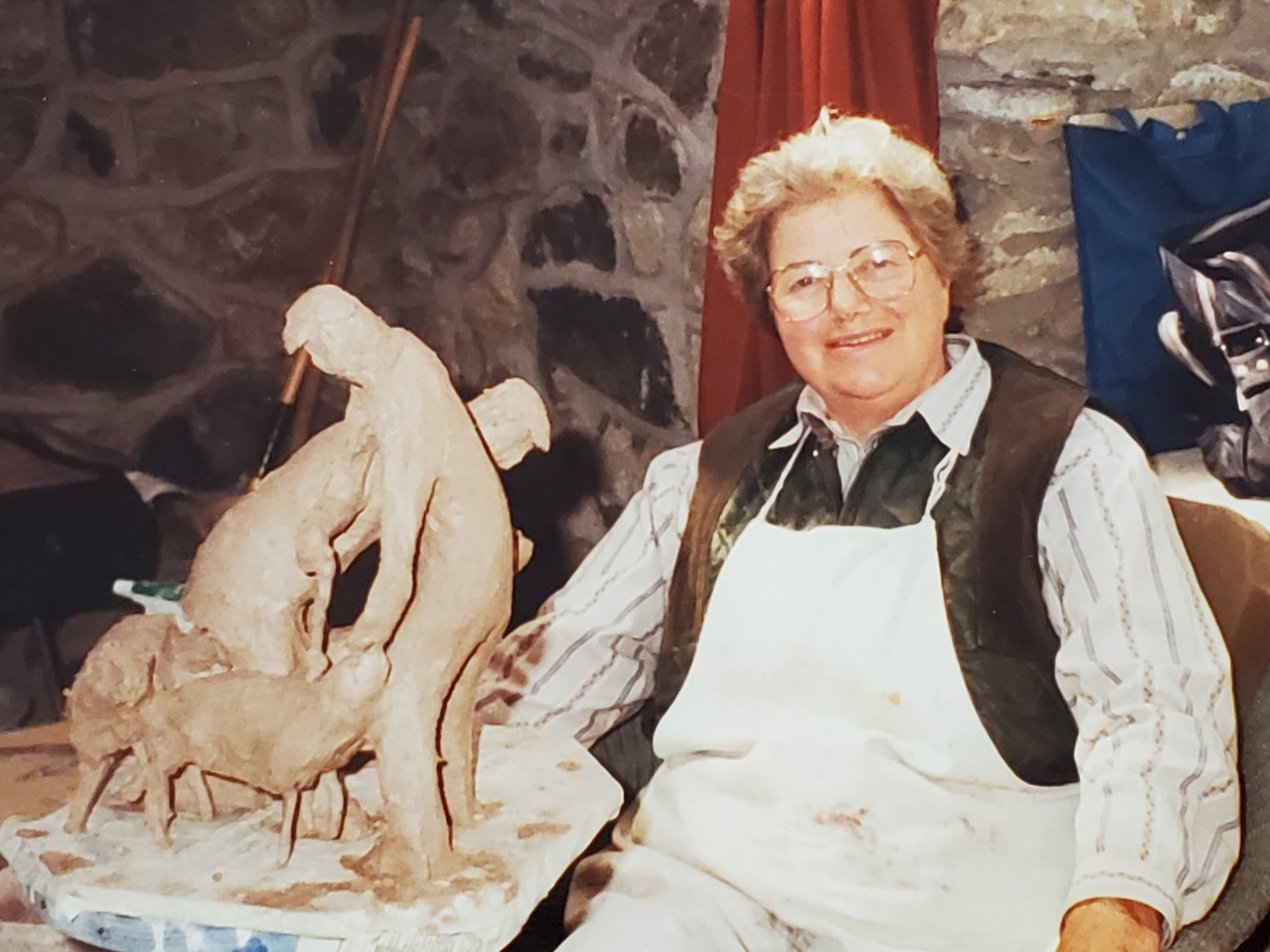
- Kitchin in her studio
- Born: 1917; Newbury, Berkshire, England
- Died: 2002 (aged 84–85)
- Education: Hornsey School of Art; Slade School of Fine Art; University of Reading; Walsall College of Art
- Known for: Painting; ceramics

Myfanwy Kitchin (1917–2002) was a British artist known for her paintings and, later in her career, ceramic sculptures.

== Biography ==
Kitchin was born in Newbury, Berkshire into a Welsh family. She studied at the Hornsey School of Art in London from 1935 to 1939. During World War II, Kitchin combined studying part-time at the Slade School of Fine Art with training to be a nurse at the Radcliffe Infirmary in Oxford and won a Slade Composition prize in 1944. After the War, she read Fine Art at the University of Reading before taking a lecturing post at the Paignton College of Art until 1951.

Kitchin combined her art career with a number of other roles. She worked as the Midlands art critic of The Guardian from 1960 to 1978 and illustrated books for both Phoenix House and, throughout the 1960s and 1970S, for Duckworth Publishers. Her paintings often depicted industrial workers in the Midlands and, later, farmers and farm animals in the Welsh countryside near her home at Barmouth. The same subjects appeared in the ceramic works which, based on her on-site sketches, she created using the slab-pottery technique. In the 1980s, Kitchin studied part-time at the Walsall College of Art.

Kitchin was a member of the Royal Cambrian Academy and regularly exhibited with the Royal Birmingham Society of Artists and had a number of solo exhibitions at galleries in Birmingham, Lichfield, Walsell and north Wales. Examples of both her paintings and ceramics are held by the New Art Gallery Walsall.
