= Bill Kitchen =

Bill Kitchen may refer to:

- Bill Kitchen (ice hockey) (1960–2012), professional ice hockey player
- Bill Kitchen (speedway rider) (1908–1994), English international speedway rider
- Bill Kitchen (inventor) (born 1948), American inventor and business executive
