= Henry Kitchener =

Professor Henry Kitchener MD FRCOG FRCS(Glas) FMedSci
- Professor Kitchener, December 2009
- Born: Henry Charles Kitchener; 1 July 1951 (age 75); Glasgow, Scotland
- Education: University of Glasgow
- Known for: Human Papillomavirus; Cervical Cancer; Vaccines
- Spouse: Valerie Kitchener
- Fields: Gynaecology; Oncology; Virology
- Workplaces: University of Manchester

Henry Kitchener, MD FRCOG FRCS(Glas) FMedSci, is a British expert in gynaecological oncology, based at the University of Manchester. He is a fellow of the Academy of Medical Sciences.

== Research ==
Prof. Kitchener's work has centred on research into Human Papillomavirus ("HPV").

He is an advocate of HPV testing and cervical screening for women, and has led various trials for HPV vaccines, including a cervical screening of 25,000 women.

His research has been funded by a number of groups, including the Medical Research Council, Cancer Research UK, Wellbeing of Women, and other national and local charities.

== Career ==
- MRCOG (1980)
- Florence and William Blair-Bell research fellow, University of Glasgow (1980–1982)
- Lecturer in obstetrics and gynaecology, University of Singapore (1983–1984)
- William Blair-Bell memorial lecturer, Royal College of Obstetricians and Gynaecologists (1985)
- Consultant obstetrician and gynaecologist, University of Aberdeen (1988–1996)
- FRCS(Glas) (1989)
- FRCOG (1994)
- Professor of gynaecological oncology, University of Manchester (1996–present)
- Vice-President of the British Society for Colposcopy and Cervical Pathology (1997–1999)
- President of the British Society for Colposcopy and Cervical Pathology (2000–2003)
- Fellow of the Academy of Medical Sciences (2007)
- Chair of the Gynaecological Cancer InterGroup (2008)

== Publications ==
Professor Kitchener is the author and co-author of numerous peer-reviewed journal articles and books including:

- (2010) The development of priority cervical cancer trials: a Gynecologic Cancer InterGroup report. International journal of gynecological cancer, Official Journal of the International Gynecological Cancer Society, 20(6), 1092–100.
- (2008) Informing adolescents about human papillomavirus vaccination: what will parents allow? Vaccine, 26( 18),
- (2006) HPV testing in routine cervical screening: cross sectional data from the ARTISTIC trial. British Journal of Cancer, 95( 1), 56–61.
- (2003) Management of women who test positive for high-risk types of human papillomavirus: the HART Study. The Lancet.
