= Kitchen Run =

Stream in Ohio, U.S.

Coordinates: 39°31′53″N 82°16′32″W

Kitchen Run is a stream in the U.S. state of Ohio.

Kitchen Run was named for one Mr. Kitchen, who killed a deer near the stream.

== See also ==
- List of rivers of Ohio
