= Tella Kitchen =

American politician (1902–1988)

Tella Kitchen (February 14, 1902 – June 21, 1988) was an American folk artist known for her paintings of landscapes and town life in rural Indiana and Ohio. She was a self-taught artist, whose work was based on her memories of her life. Her work achieved national recognition, and can be found in the collections of the American Folk Art Museum.

== Biography ==
She was born Tella Denehue, on a small farm in the hills of Vinton County, Ohio, near the village of Londonderry, in neighboring Ross County, Ohio. Her father's family had immigrated to the United States from County Cork, Ireland; her mother's family was from Pennsylvania. During her childhood she moved with her family to Indiana, where they settled on a small farm near Independence.

In 1920 she married Noland Kitchen, and the couple moved to the village of Adelphi, Ohio, where they raised four children. Noland Kitchen served as mayor of Adelphi; the Kitchens also operated a gas station, sold used cars, and farmed.

After her husband's death in 1963, Tella Kitchen succeeded him as mayor of Adelphi. At some point during this period of her life, her son Denny gave her a paint set as a gift, and she began painting when she was around 67 years old, drawing on her memories of her childhood, and her experiences of rural and town life, including contemporary events.

Through the efforts of Denny Kitchen, the artist's son, her work came to the attention of the folk art historian Robert Bishop, then a curator at the Henry Ford Museum, in Dearborn, Michigan, and later the director of the Museum of American Folk Art (since 2001 known as the American Folk Art Museum), in New York City; Bishop included Kitchen in his book Folk Painters of America (1979).

== Selected paintings ==
- The Joy of Winter, depicting a horse-drawn funeral procession in Adelphi, Ohio
- Our Family Doctor, Independence, Indiana
- Our First School Bus, set in Adelphi, Ohio, in 1921
- When the Fred Buck Livery Stable Burned (1976), depicting a fire that Kitchen witnessed in Independence, Indiana
