= John Kitchen =

John Kitchen may refer to:

- John Kitchen (English politician) (by 1507 – 1562), MP for Lancashire
- John Joseph Kitchen (1911–1973), US federal judge
- John Kitchen (musician) (born 1950), Scottish organist and music scholar
