= Paul Kitchen =

American Singer-Songwriter-Musician (born 1957)

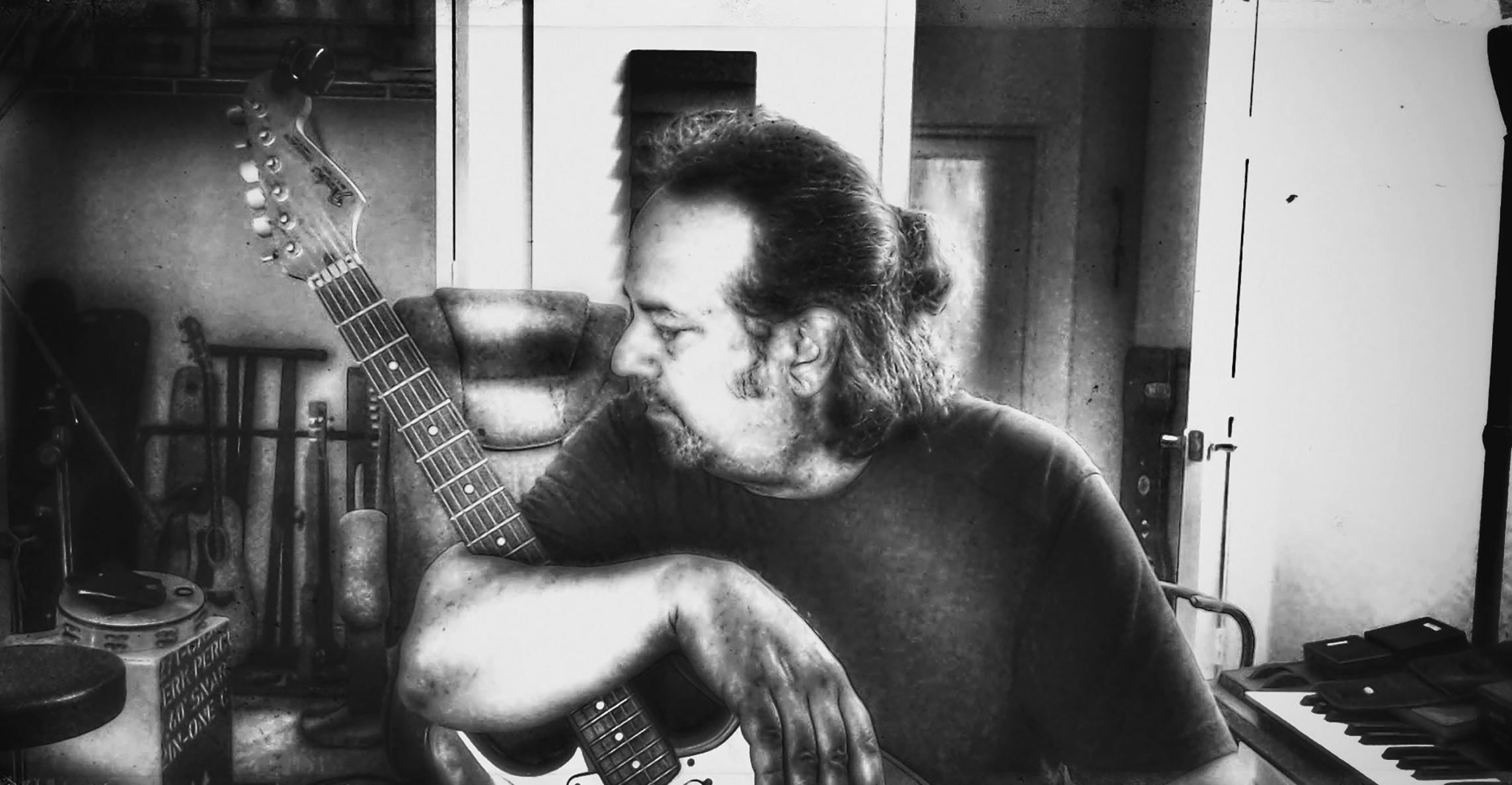

Background information
- Born: December 7, 1957 (age 68); Washington, D.C.
- Instruments: Electric guitar; Bass guitar; Drums; Vocals; Keyboards; Piano; Lap Steel
- Years active: 1977–present
- Labels: Yin and Wack Records
- Website: paulkitchen.com

Paul Kitchen (born 1957) is an American Singer-Songwriter-Musician, who has recorded 23 albums of mostly original songs between 1977 and the present. A multi-instrumentalist, Paul Kitchen often plays all of the instruments on his albums, and performed with the band Petty Tyrant in the late 1980s. An interesting fact is he learned to play the guitar upside-down ala Albert King.

Paul Kitchen's best selling song is "Daddy's Little Girl", from the album A Matter Of Time in 2001. After a 14-year absence, "Living With Fiction" was released in December 2015. "Everyone Says Hi", a tribute to David Bowie was released February 24, 2016, followed by the covers album "Wheelhouse" released May 21, 2016. His latest album "Potshots From Over the Hill" was released December 7, 2020. The Podcast "Paul Kitchen | Live From the InSync Asylum" debuted in May 2018.

== Discography ==
- Starting Point (1977)
- Consumer (1978)
- Metallic Scorn (1981)
- Silent Tears (1982)
- Abstract Attack (1983)
- Common Ground (1983)
- Acquiesce (1984)
- Petty Tyrant (1984)
- Inner Dialogues (1985)
- Vital Sines (1986)
- Cartel (1987)
- No Poetry Allowed (1987)
- In A Blue Night (1988)
- Lost In Babylon (1989)
- And We Dream (1993)
- A Matter Of Time (2001)
- Living With Fiction (2015)
- Everyone Says 'Hi' (Single) (2016)
- Wheelhouse (2016)
- It Ain't No Use (Single) (2017)
- When You Tell Me You Love Me (Single) (2018)
- Teach My Heart (Single) (2018)
- Blue Tattoo (2018)
- When You Tell Me You Love Me (Stripped Mix - Single) (2019)
- Troubled Man (Single) (2019)
- Delta (Single) (2019)
- Magic Moon (2019)
- Live From the inSync Asylum: Volume 1 (2020)
- You Define Mystery (Single) (2020)
- Potshots From Over the Hill (2020)
- Here (Single) (2021)
- Whisper Falls (Single) (2021)
- Caught by Your Heartbeat (Single) (2021)
- Put Your Love in My Hands (Single) (2021)
- Trip Note: 1978-2018 Vol. 1 (2021)
- Trip Note: 1978-2018 Vol. 2 (2021)
- Trip Note: 1978-2018 Vol. 3 (2021)
- Trip Note: 1978-2018 Vol. 4 (2021)
- Black & Grey (2022)
- Fighting Gravity (2023)
- Tuscazure (2024)
- Turquoise in Blue (2025)
- Evidence Vol. 1 (2025)
- Evidence Vol. 2 (2026)
- Blame It on Midnight (2026)
