= Henry Kitchener, 3rd Earl Kitchener =

British soldier and peer (1919–2011)

Major Henry Herbert Kitchener, 3rd Earl Kitchener TD DL (24 February 1919 – 16 December 2011), styled Viscount Broome from 1928 to 1937, was a British peer. He was unmarried, and when he died the title Earl Kitchener became extinct.

== Education and private life ==
He was educated at Sandroyd School in Surrey, Winchester and Trinity College, Cambridge. He succeeded his grandfather in the earldom on 27 March 1937. The following month, he was a Page of Honour to King George VI at his coronation.

Like his great-uncle before him, he was an English Freemason. He was initiated on 24 November 1947 in the Royal Somerset House & Inverness Lodge No 4 (London), and rose to senior rank, serving as Senior Grand Warden of the United Grand Lodge of England.

Henry Kitchener was also a committed supporter of the organic movement and took up a role with the charity Garden Organic (formerly the Henry Doubleday Research Association - HDRA). Having joined the charity's founder, Lawrence Hills' band of enthusiasts in July 1958, as member number 171, Henry Kitchener became its president in 1973, a position he was to occupy for the next thirty-five years. In 2008, during Garden Organic's 50th anniversary year, Earl Kitchener left the organisation as president and was replaced by Professor Tim Lang. However Earl Kitchener remained interested in the organic movement and regularly wrote and updated the organisation whenever a subject arose that he felt passionately about.

== Military career ==
Lord Kitchener served in the Royal Corps of Signals, retiring with the rank of major, and was President of the Lord Kitchener National Memorial Fund from 1950 until his death. In 1972, he served as Deputy Lieutenant of Cheshire. He was a Vice President of The Western Front Association.

== Political career ==
Lord Kitchener took his seat in the House of Lords in 1942 and made his maiden speech in 1983.

Lord Kitchener, who had been a member of the Council of the UK's Electoral Reform Society, was a strong supporter of its advocacy of the electoral system that provided proportional representation using the Single Transferable Vote, known as PR-STV.

As a hereditary peer, who had a right to sit and vote in the House of Lords - until that right was largely removed for such peers in 1999 - he had, with his friend and colleague, the late Earl Russell, spoken persuasively in the House in support of open list PR-STV for UK elections of Members of the European Parliament, when that House amended, on four separate occasions, a 1998 Lower House Bill that provided for a closed list only.

Within the Electoral Reform Society, the Earl Kitchener had also been a strong advocate for the use of the Meek system of PR-STV, which had been devised by his colleague, Brian Meek.

Lord Kitchener had, in 1992 visited Australia to assist in a successful campaign for the entrenchment, as the result of a successful 1995 referendum, of a PR-STV electoral system for the legislature of the Australian Capital Territory. He had earlier visited New Zealand, where he studied attitudes to the new MMP electoral system there, and what he regarded as a far superior approach to MMP, which was the Meek system of PR-STV that New Zealand has legislated for use as an option in municipal elections.

== Scientific career ==
Lord Kitchener was a qualified physicist. He spent most of his working life with ICI at Winnington, Cheshire.

Lord Kitchener's interest in the application of evidence-based research was demonstrated by his role of President and a Trustee of the Institute for Food, Brain and Behaviour (formerly Natural Justice) a UK charity conducting scientific research into the effects of nutrition on brain function and behaviour. Kitchener was associated with the charity for over 20 years serving under two chairmen, the late Bishop Hugh Montefiore and the succeeding chairman, Mrs Frances Jackson. He took a keen, detailed, interest in IFBB's scientific work, interrogating scientists robustly at Board Meetings on the progress of their research and was a keen and perceptive reader of academic journal articles and papers.

== Family ==
Earl Kitchener was the son of Captain Henry Franklin Chevallier Kitchener, Viscount Broome, only son of Henry Kitchener, 2nd Earl Kitchener. His granduncle was the renowned military commander Herbert Kitchener, 1st Earl Kitchener.

His niece Emma Joy Kitchener, LVO (2000) (born 1963), a lady-in-waiting to Princess Michael of Kent, married Julian Fellowes on 28 April 1990. On 15 October 1998 the Fellowes family changed its surname from Fellowes to Kitchener-Fellowes. She is also a great-grandniece of Herbert, 1st Earl Kitchener.

Lord Fellowes publicly expressed his dissatisfaction that the proposals to change the rules of royal succession were not extended to hereditary peerages, which had they been would have allowed his wife to succeed her uncle as Countess Kitchener in her own right. Or as he put it "I find it ridiculous that, in 2011, a perfectly sentient adult woman has no rights of inheritance whatsoever when it comes to a hereditary title" Instead, the title became extinct on her uncle's death because there were no male heirs. On 9 May 2012, Queen Elizabeth II issued a Royal Warrant of Precedence granting Lady Emma Fellowes the same rank and style as the daughter of an earl, as would have been due to her if her late father had survived his brother and therefore succeeded to the earldom.

== Arms ==
Coat of arms of Henry Kitchener, 3rd Earl Kitchener
Coronet A Coronet of an Earl Crest A Stag's Head erased transfixed through the neck by an Arrow in bend point to the dexter all proper and between the attires a Horseshoe Or Escutcheon Gules a Chevron Argent surmounted by another Azure between three Bustards proper on the centre chief point a Bezant Supporters Dexter: a Camel proper, bridle, trappings and line pendent, reflexed over the back Gules, gorged with a Collar Or, suspended therefrom an Escutcheon paly bendy Azure and Ermine, a Canton of the last, charged with a Portcullis Or; Sinister: a Gnu proper, gorged as the dexter, suspended therefrom an Escutcheon Ermine charged with a Chevron engrailed Vert, thereon four Horse-Shoes, also Or Motto Thorough

== Notes ==
Peerage of the United Kingdom
Preceded by Henry Kitchener	Earl Kitchener; 1937–2011	Extinct
