= Henry Kitchener, 2nd Earl Kitchener =

British soldier and peer (1846–1937)

Colonel The Right Honourable The Earl Kitchener
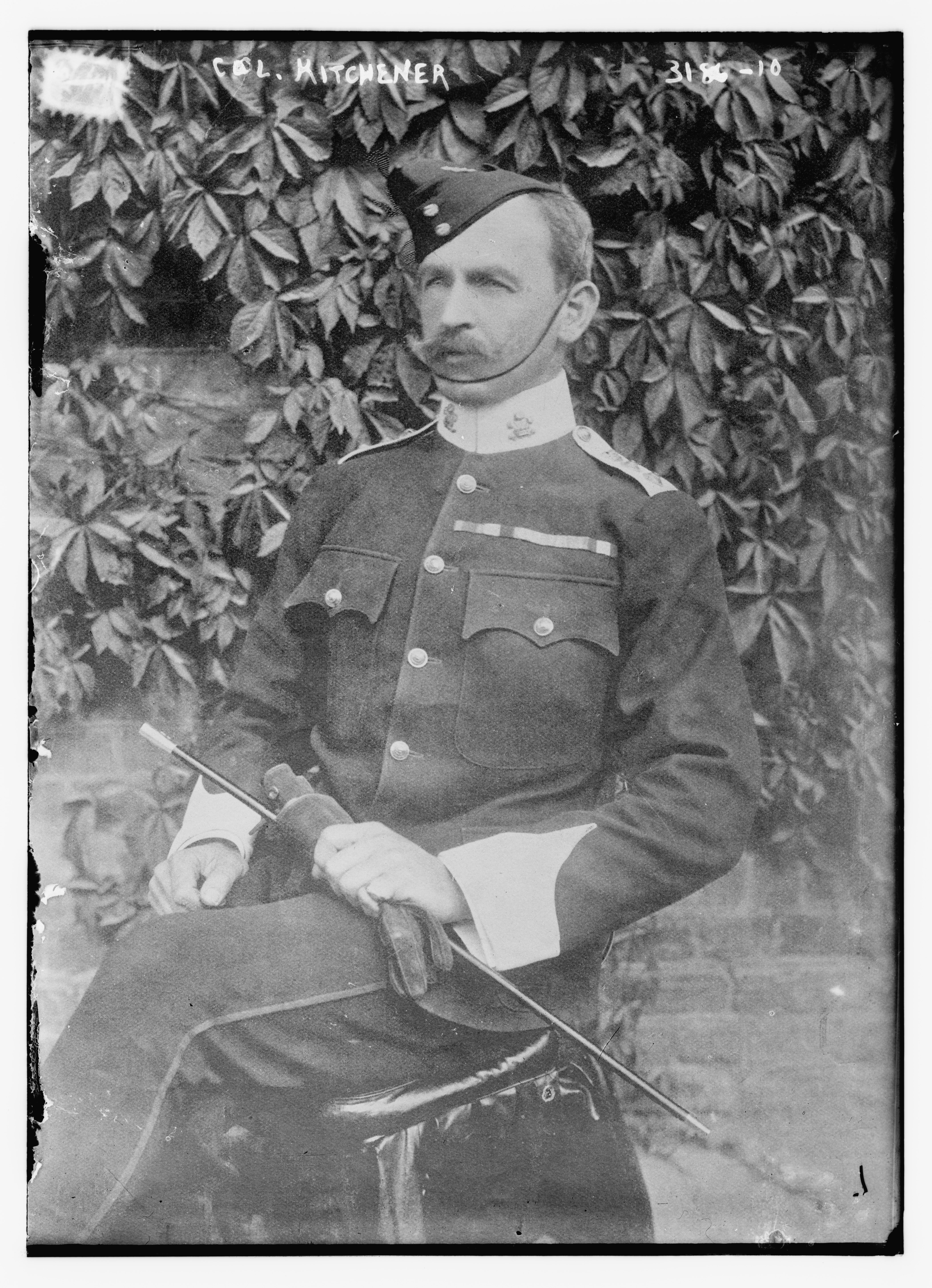
- Kitchener, c. 1910–1915
- Born: Henry Elliott Chevallier Kitchener; 5 October 1846
- Died: 27 March 1937 (aged 90); Nairobi, Kenya Colony
- Spouse: Eleanor Fanny Lushington (m. 1877; died 1897)
- Relatives: Herbert Kitchener, 1st Earl Kitchener (brother); Frederick Walter Kitchener (brother); Henry Kitchener, 3rd Earl Kitchener (grandson)
- Military career
- Allegiance: United Kingdom
- Branch: British Army
- Service years: 1866–1903, 1916–1918
- Rank: Colonel
- Units: 46th (South Devonshire) Regiment of Foot; Duke of Cornwall's Light Infantry
- Conflicts: Franco-Prussian War; Manipur Expedition; First World War; South-West Africa Campaign; East African Campaign

Colonel Henry Elliott Chevallier Kitchener, 2nd Earl Kitchener (5 October 1846 – 27 March 1937) was a British soldier and peer.

== Early life and career ==
He was the eldest of five children born to Lieutenant-Colonel Henry Horatio Kitchener (1805–1894) and his first wife Anne Frances Chevallier (1826–1864). Among his siblings was the military commander Herbert Kitchener, 1st Earl Kitchener.

He spent his early life in Tralee in Ireland, where he and his siblings received their education from governesses and tutors. Kitchener joined the British Army in 1866 and was commissioned into the 46th (South Devonshire) Regiment of Foot, before joining the newly created Duke of Cornwall's Light Infantry when it was founded in 1881. During the Franco-Prussian War of 1870–71, he served alongside his brother in France. He served as garrison instructor at the Curragh Camp in Ireland from July 1876 until July 1878 and was appointed the instructor in military topography at the Royal Military College in 1879, a post he held until August 1886.

He saw his first action in Burma with the British Army, where he was chief transport officer of the Field Force's during the Manipur Expedition in 1891. He was posted to Jamaica in December 1898, where he was appointed deputy assistant adjutant general for the British colony before receiving his final posting in the army when he was appointed commander of the Depot for the West India Regiment. He retired from the army in 1903 with the rank of colonel.

== Post-retirement ==
After retiring he remained in Jamaica where he was a property owner. He became involved in local politics and contested the St Andrew Parish in the legislative council elections but was not elected. With the outbreak of the First World War, he was recalled to the army and was posted to take up a command post in South West Africa; he was also put in command of a British Expeditionary Force sent to fight the Germans in East Africa. In accordance with a special remainder in the letters patent, he succeeded his younger brother as second Earl Kitchener on 5 June 1916. He left Jamaica to return to Britain in 1918. After the war he moved to Kenya where he was active in encouraging the settlement of war veterans in the British colony; he also developed a number of flax-producing estates there.

Kitchener was married in 1877 to Eleanor Fanny Lushington (died 1897), with whom he had a son and a daughter:

- Henry Franklin Chevallier Kitchener, Viscount Broome (17 Oct 1878 – 13 Jun 1928), commanded British naval forces at the Battle of Imbros during the First World War
- Lady Nora Fanny Kitchener (1882 – 10 May 1919)

His son and heir Henry Franklin Kitchener, Viscount Broome (1878–1928) predeceased him, so on his own death in 1937 in Nairobi, Kenya, his titles passed to his grandson Henry Herbert Kitchener.

His great-granddaughter Emma Joy Kitchener (born 1962) is the wife of actor Julian Fellowes, Baron Fellowes of West Stafford, and is a lady-in-waiting to Princess Michael of Kent.

Peerage of the United Kingdom
Preceded by Herbert Kitchener	Earl Kitchener; 1916–1937	Succeeded by Henry Kitchener
