= Walter Kitchener =

British Army general (1858–1912)

Lieutenant-General Sir Walter Kitchener KCB
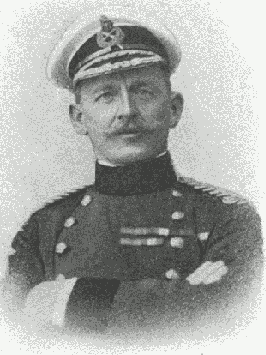
- Born: 26 May 1858
- Died: 6 March 1912 (aged 53); Hamilton, Bermuda
- Spouse: Caroline Fenton (m. 1884)
- Relatives: Herbert Kitchener, 1st Earl Kitchener (brother); Henry Kitchener, 2nd Earl Kitchener (brother)
- Military career
- Allegiance: United Kingdom
- Branch: British Army
- Service years: 1876–1912
- Rank: Lieutenant-General
- Commands: Lahore Division; Governor of Bermuda and General Officer Commanding-in-Chief Bermuda Command
- Conflicts: Second Anglo-Afghan War; Battle of Charasiab; Mahdist War; Battle of Omdurman; Second Boer War; Relief of Ladysmith

Signature
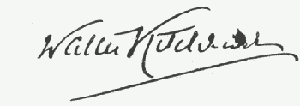

Lieutenant-General Sir Frederick Walter Kitchener KCB (26 May 1858 – 6 March 1912) was a British soldier and colonial administrator.

== Military career ==
GOCinC Sir F.W. Kitchener with The Duke of Cornwall's Light Infantry at Prospect Camp, Devonshire, Bermuda in 1909

Kitchener was the youngest son of Henry Horatio Kitchener (1805–1894) and his wife Frances Anne Chevallier (1826–1864). In 1876 he followed his elder brother Herbert Kitchener in taking up a career in the British Army. Initially commissioned as an unattached sub-lieutenant, he joined the 14th Foot (later the West Yorkshire Regiment) in 1877. He served in the Second Anglo-Afghan War as a transport officer to the Kabul Field Force and took part in the first Battle of Charasiab and the battle of Karez Meer. Kitchener also saw action in the Chardeh Valley. He was promoted to captain on 11 November 1882, to major on 7 March 1892, and to lieutenant-colonel on 18 November 1896.

He later served in Egypt during the Mahdist War where his brother Lord Kitchener was commanding British forces. During the war Walter was made director of Transport during the 1898 Nile expedition and advance on Khartoum. He was appointed commander of the Kordofan force and took part in the Battle of Omdurman which resulted in the recapture of Khartoum which had been captured by Mahdist's during the Siege of Khartoum in 1885. He was appointed Khartoum's military governor after it came under Anglo-Egyptian control.

In 1899 Kitchener was appointed to the staff of Sir Redvers Buller in South Africa and took part in attempts to relieve Ladysmith during the Second Boer War. He was expected to be given an important post in South Africa but was passed over by his brother because Lord Kitchener (Commander-in-Chief of the troops in South Africa) did not want to be accused of favouritism. During the latter part of the war, he commanded troops in Western Transvaal, and following the announcement of peace on 31 May 1902, he supervised the surrender of arms in that area. He left Cape Town on board the SS Dunvegan Castle in late June 1902, and arrived at Southampton the next month. For his service in South Africa he, was awarded the Queen's South Africa Medal with five clasps and the King's South Africa Medal with two clasps, and was created a Companion of the Order of the Bath (CB) in the October 1902 South Africa Honours list.

In late 1902 he was posted to British India, where on 14 November 1902 he took up the command of the Lahore Division (Mecan Meer District). He was promoted to lieutenant general in October 1906.

He was appointed Governor and military Commander-in-Chief (General Officer Commanding-in-Chief) of Bermuda, a strategic Imperial fortress colony (now described as a British Overseas Territory) in the North Atlantic Ocean with a disproportionately large garrison, effective 31 October 1908, serving until his death in Hamilton following complications from an operation for appendicitis. He was buried at Prospect Camp.

== Family ==
Kitchener married Caroline Louisa Fenton, daughter of Major Charles Hamilton Fenton, on 27 November 1884 and had five children, including Major Henry Hamilton "Hal" Kitchener, a First World War aviator who returned to Bermuda after the war and ran an aviation company on Hinson's Island, previously part of the prisoner-of-war camp occupying the small islands between Hamilton Harbour and the Great Sound from which Fritz Joubert Duquesne, his uncle's alleged assassin, had escaped during the Second Boer War.

Government offices
Preceded by Josceline Wodehouse	Governor of Bermuda; 1908–1912	Succeeded by George Bullock
