= Trench (surname) =

Trench is a surname.

The Trench family supposedly originated in County Galway, Ireland as descendants of Frederic de la Tranche, a 16th-century Huguenot immigrant from Normandy, and his wife Margaret Sutton, a possible Northumbrian. The peerage titles Baron Ashtown, Baron Kilconnel, Baron Trench, Earl of Clancarty, Marquess of Heusden and Viscount Dunlo have been held by various members.

== People bearing the surname Trench ==
- Brian Trench (born 1945), Irish writer and academic.
- Brinsley Trench, 8th Earl of Clancarty (1911–1995), Irish ufologist
- David Clive Crosbie Trench (1915–1988), British army officer, Governor of Hong Kong 1964–1971
- Ernest Crosbie Trench (1869–1960), British civil engineer
- Fiachra Trench (born 1941), Irish musician and composer
- Francis Chenevix Trench (1805–1886), English divine and author
- Frederick Trench (MP for Galway) (1681–1752), Irish politician
- Frederick Trench, 1st Baron Ashtown (1755–1840), Irish politician
- Frederick Trench, 2nd Baron Ashtown (1804–1880), Irish peer and magistrate
- Frederick Trench, 3rd Baron Ashtown (1868–1946), Anglo-Irish unionist landowner
- Herbert Trench (1865–1923), Irish poet
- Martin Edward Trench (1869–1927), United States Navy officer, Governor of the U.S. Virgin Islands 1925–1927
- Melesina Trench (1768–1827), Irish writer, poet and diarist
- Nicholas Trench, 9th Earl of Clancarty (born 1952), Anglo-Irish artist, freelance writer, and translator
- Power Le Poer Trench (1770–1839), Irish Anglican archbishop
- Power Henry Le Poer Trench (1841–1899), British diplomat
- Nigel Trench, 7th Baron Ashtown (1916–2010), British army officer and diplomat
- Richard Trench (politician) (1710–1768), Irish politician
- Richard Trench, 2nd Earl of Clancarty (1767–1837), Anglo-Irish politician and diplomat
- Richard Chenevix Trench (1807–1886), Irish Anglican archbishop and poet
- William Trench, 1st Earl of Clancarty (1741–1805), Irish politician
- William Trench, 3rd Earl of Clancarty (1803–1872), Irish peer
- William Trench III (1831–1896), Scottish-Canadian blacksmith, fire chief, and carriage builder
- William Le Poer Trench (1837–1920), British army officer and politician

== Fictional characters ==
- Kevin Trench, public identity of the Marvel Comics' character Nightwatch/Nighteater
- Sylvia Trench, "Bond girl" in the first two James Bond films

== See also ==
- Trench (disambiguation), other uses of the word
- , possible including bearers of the surname not listed above
