= William Trench, 5th Earl of Clancarty =

Irish nobleman (1868–1929)

William Trench
- Earl of Clancarty
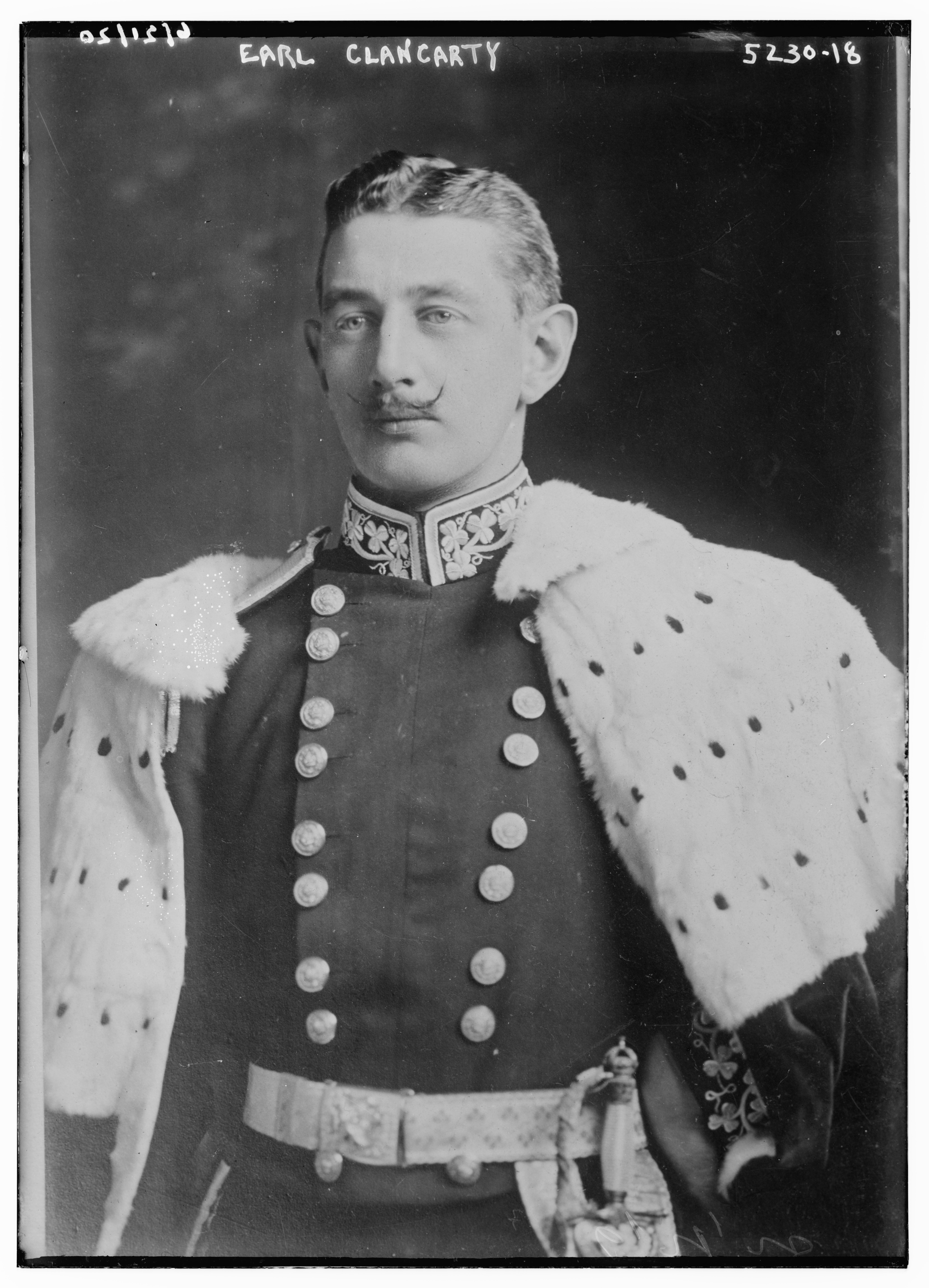
- A photograph of William Frederick Le Poer Trench

Earl of Clancarty
- Predecessor: Richard Trench, 4th Earl of Clancarty
- Successor: Richard Trench, 6th Earl of Clancarty
- Born: William Frederick De Poer Trench; 29 December 1868
- Died: 16 February 1929 (aged 60)
- Spouses: Belle Bilton, Mary Gwatkin Ellis
- Issue: 6 male children; 2 female children
- Father: Richard Trench, 4th Earl of Clancarty
- Mother: Adeliza Hervey
- Occupation: Politician

William Frederick Le Poer Trench, 5th Earl of Clancarty, 4th Marquess of Heusden (29 December 1868 – 16 February 1929) was an Irish peer of the House of Lords, a Dutch nobleman, and a deputy lieutenant and justice of the peace of County Galway. He was known for the controversy that ensued after a petition for divorce was argued in 1890, which was based on an affidavit accusing his wife at the time, Belle Bilton, of adultery.

== Family history ==
The Trench lineage on England began with Frederic de la Trenche, who emigrated to Northumberland, England from the Spanish Netherlands in around 1575. Frederic de la Trenche's grandson, Frederic Trench, emigrated to Ireland from England in 1631.

Lord Clancarty's great-grandfather, Richard Trench, 2nd Earl of Clancarty, was granted the hereditary title of Marquess of Heusden for his service as a Dutch diplomat. The 2nd Earl's father, William Trench, 1st Earl of Clancarty, was a prominent member of the Irish House of Commons and later the House of Lords.

== Early life and education ==
Lord Clancarty was born on 29 December 1868, the elder son of Richard Trench, 4th Earl of Clancarty and Adeliza Hervey. He used the courtesy title Viscount Dunlo after 1872, when his father succeeded as 4th Earl. He succeeded to the earldom and other titles in 1891 upon the death of his father.

Clancarty was educated at Eton College before serving as a Second Lieutenant in the 4th Battalion of the King's Shropshire Light Infantry (Royal Herefordshire Militia).

== 1889–1891 and the cause célèbre ==
Dunlo married in 1889 and succeeded his father as the 5th Earl of Clancarty in 1891. The period between those events saw his father, who strongly objected to the marriage, try to undermine it, and place as much as possible of the family estate beyond Dunlo as heir. His initial step was to order Dunlo, who was still under the age of majority of 21, to travel to Australia.

A petition for divorce was argued in court in 1890, on behalf of Dunlo, before Sir James Hannen. It was based on an affidavit signed in Australia by Dunlo, who later claimed he had signed it without understanding its implications, and named Isidor(e) Emanuel Wertheimer in alleged adultery with his wife Belle Bilton, now Lady Dunlo, in London. It became a cause célèbre. The jury found that no misconduct of Lady Dunlo with Wertheimer had been proved; and she was given a highly-paid role in a burlesque Venus by the impresario Augustus Harris.

== Later life ==
Lord Clancarty also served in the positions of deputy lieutenant and justice of the peace of County Galway. Lord Clancarty ran into financial troubles and in 1904 sold the family property at Ballinasloe, County Galway. He was declared bankrupt in 1910.

== Marriages and children ==
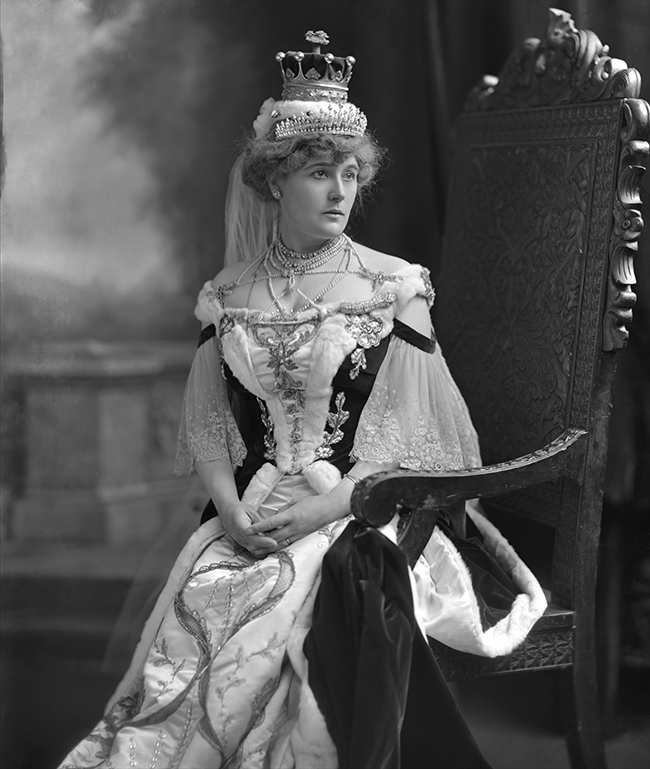
The Countess of Clancarty, the former music hall performer Belle Bilton, 1902 photograph

Clancarty, then known as Viscount Dunlo, married Belle Bilton on 10 July 1889. She was a well-paid music hall performer with the real name of Isabel Maude Penrice Bilton, daughter of John George Bilton, a sergeant in the Royal Engineers. She died on 31 December 1906. They had five children:

- Richard Frederick John Donough Le Poer Trench, 6th Earl of Clancarty (27 December 1891 – 5 June 1971)
- Hon. Power Francis William Le Poer Trench (27 December 1891 – 9 June 1894), twin brother of Richard
- Lady Beryl Franziska Kathleen Bianca Le Poer Trench (8 October 1893 – 17 May 1957) - Capt. Hon. Richard Philip Stanhope, son of Arthur Stanhope, 6th Earl Stanhope
- Hon. Roderic Charles Berkeley Le Poer Trench (19 October 1895 – 23 January 1937)
- Greville Sydney Rocheforte Le Poer Trench, 7th Earl of Clancarty (10 December 1902 – 15 September 1975)

On 7 October 1908, he married Mary Gwatkin Ellis, and they had two boys and a girl:

- William Francis Brinsley Le Poer Trench, 8th Earl of Clancarty (18 September 1911 – 18 May 1995)
- Hon. Power Edward Ford Le Poer Trench (22 January 1917 – 29 January 1995), father of Nicholas Trench, 9th Earl of Clancarty
- Lady Sibell Alma Kathleen Le Poer Trench (21 May 1918 – 1974)

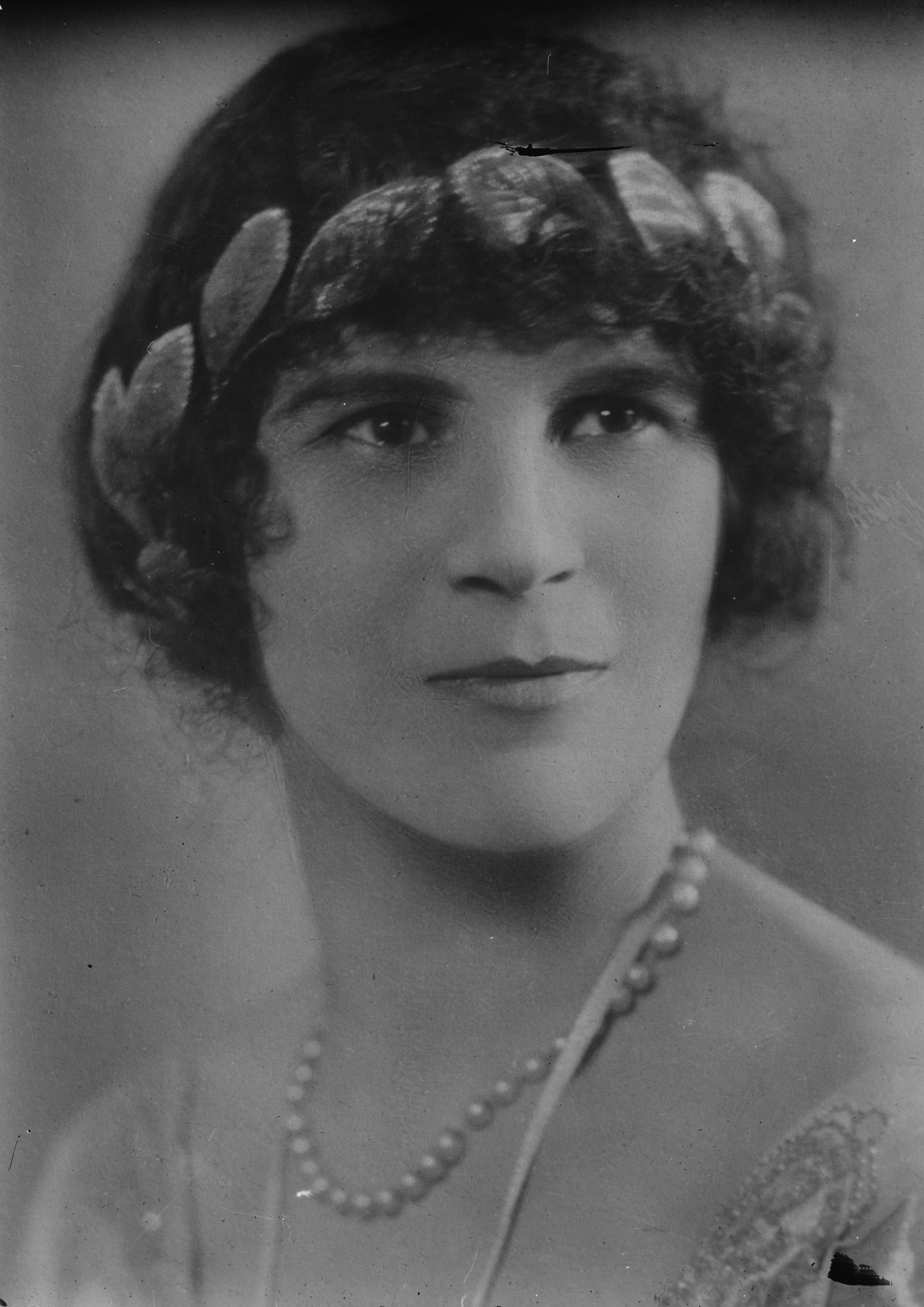
Mary, Countess of Clancarty

== Death ==
Lord Clancarty died on 16 February 1929 at the age of 60. He was buried in the Clancarty family vault in Highgate Cemetery. He was succeeded in the earldom and other titles by his eldest son, Richard.

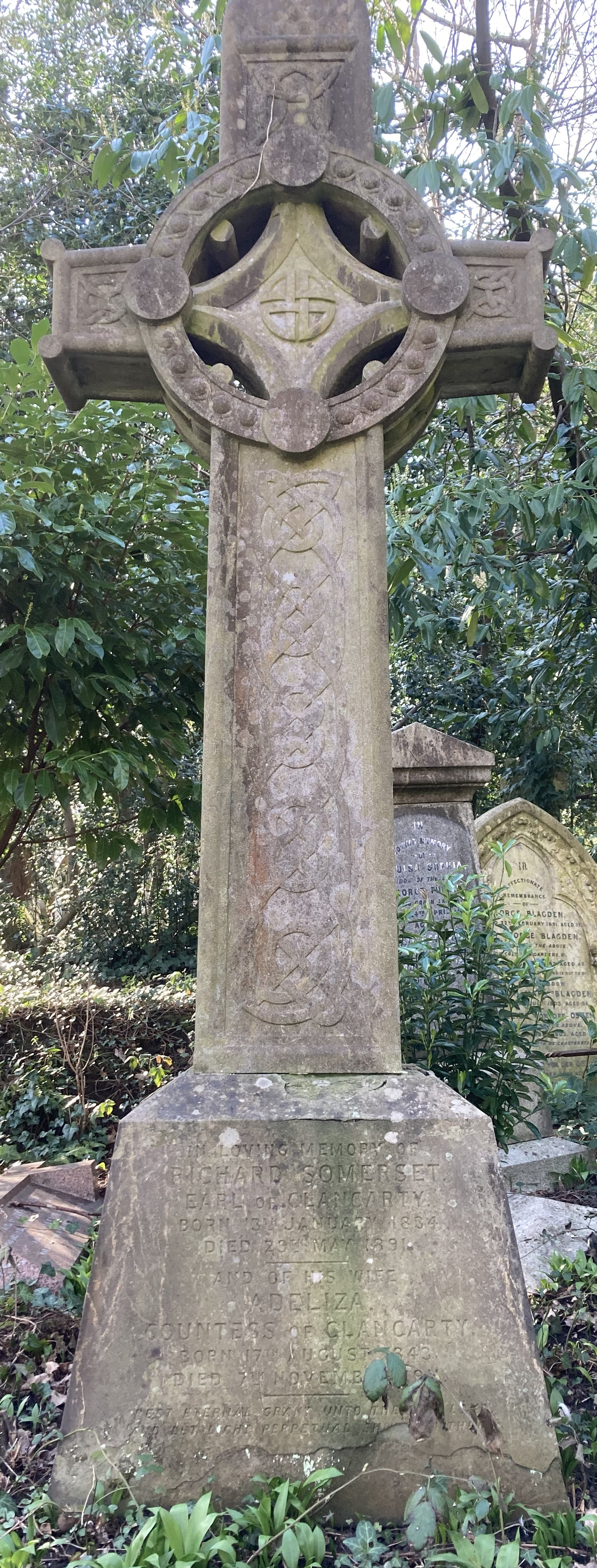
Clancarty vault containing the remains of the 4th Earl, Richard Somerset, and the 5th, William Trench, in Highgate Cemetery

== In literature ==
The story of the early relationship troubles of Lord and Lady Dunlo is the subject of the 2018 novel Becoming Belle by Nuala Ní Chonchúir, writing as Nuala O'Connor.

Peerage of Ireland
Preceded by Richard Somerset Le Poer Trench	Earl of Clancarty; 2nd creation 1891–1929	Succeeded by Richard Frederick Le Poer Trench
Dutch nobility
Preceded by Richard Somerset Le Poer Trench	Marquess of Heusden; 1891–1929	Succeeded by Richard Frederick Le Poer Trench
