= Richard Trench =

Richard Trench may refer to:

- Richard Trench (politician) (1710–1768), Irish MP for Banagher and Galway County
- Richard Trench, 2nd Earl of Clancarty (1767–1837), his grandson, Dutch noble, Irish and British MP, diplomat
- Richard Trench, 4th Earl of Clancarty (1834–1891), Irish peer and Dutch noble
- Richard Chenevix Trench (1807–1886), Irish poet and Archbishop of Dublin
