= Frederick Trench =

Frederick Trench may refer to:

- Frederick Trench (MP for Galway) (1681–1752), Irish MP for Galway County
- Frederick Trench (MP for Maryborough), Irish Member of Parliament
- Frederick Trench, 1st Baron Ashtown (1755–1840), Irish MP for Portarlington and Maryborough
- Frederick Trench, 2nd Baron Ashtown (1804–1880), his nephew, Irish peer
- Frederick Trench, 3rd Baron Ashtown (1868–1946), his grandson, Irish peer
- Frederick Trench (British Army officer) (c. 1777–1859), British soldier and Tory politician
