= Earl of Clancarty =

Noble title in the Peerage of Ireland

Earl of Clancarty 2nd creation
- Arms: Quarterly: 1st & 4th, Argent, a Lion passant Gules, between three Fleurs-de-lis Azure, on a Chief Azure, a Sun-in-Splendour Or (for Trench); 2nd & 3rd, Argent, a Chief indented Sable (for Le Poer); over all an Inescutcheon Or, ensigned with the Coronet of a Marquis of the Netherlands, and charged with a Wheel of six spokes Gules (for the Marquessate of Heusden). Crests: Centre: A Lion rampant Or, imperially crowned proper, and holding in the dexter paw a Sword Argent, pommel and hilt Or, in the sinister paw a Sheaf of Arrows Or; Dexter: An Arm in Armour embowed holding a Scimitar, all proper (for Trench); Sinister: A Stag’s Head cabossed Argent, attired Or, between the attires a Crucifix proper (for Le Poer). Supporters: Dexter: A Lion Gules, semée of Fleurs-de-lis Or; Sinister: A Stag guardant proper, attired Or, between the attires a Crucifix and supporting with the sinister forepaw a Lance resting bendwise over the shoulder proper, thereon a Banner Argent, charged with a Chief indented Sable (being the arms of Le Poer).
- Creation date: 11 February 1803
- Creation: Second
- Created by: George III
- Peerage: Ireland
- First holder: William Trench, 1st Viscount Dunlo
- Present holder: Nicholas Trench, 9th Earl of Clancarty
- Subsidiary titles: Viscount Dunlo; Viscount Clancarty (United Kingdom); Baron Kilconnel; Baron Trench (United Kingdom); Marquess of Heusden (Netherlands)
- Status: Extant
- Former seat: Garbally Court
- Motto: CONSILIO ET PRUDENTIA (By counsel and prudence); DIEU POUR LA TRENCHE QUICONTRE (If God is for Trench, who can be against)

Earl of Clancarty 1st creation
- Arms: Argent, a Stag trippant Gules, attired and ungiled Or. Crest: A dexter Arm in Armour proper, cuffed Argent, erect and couped at the wrist holding in the hand a Lizard proper. Supporters: On either side an Angel proper, vested Argent, habited Gules, winged Or, holding in the exterior hand a Shield thereon a Human Head erased affrontée.
- Creation date: 26 November 1658
- Creation: First
- Created by: Charles II
- Peerage: Ireland
- First holder: Donough MacCarty, 2nd Viscount Muskerry
- Last holder: Donough MacCarty, 4th Earl of Clancarty
- Subsidiary titles: Viscount Muskerry; Baron of Blarney; Baronet 'of Muskerry'
- Status: Forfeited
- Extinction date: 11 May 1691
- Motto: FORTI ET NIHIL DIFFICILE (Brave and obstinate)

Earl of Clancarty is a title that has been created twice in the Peerage of Ireland.

== History ==
The title was created for the first time in 1658 in favour of Donough MacCarty, 2nd Viscount Muskerry, of the MacCarthy of Muskerry dynasty. He had earlier represented County Cork in the Irish House of Commons. Lord Clancarty had already been created a baronet in the Baronetage of Nova Scotia in c. 1638, before he succeeded his father in the viscountcy. The title of Viscount Muskerry had been created in the Peerage of Ireland in 1628 for his father Charles MacCarthy. The first Earl Donough MacCarty was succeeded by his grandson Charles, the second Earl; he was the son of Charles MacCarty, Viscount Muskerry, who was killed during the Second Anglo-Dutch War. Charles, Lord Clancarty died as an infant and was succeeded by his uncle Callaghan MacCarty, the third Earl. On his death the titles passed to his son Donough MacCarty, the fourth Earl. He supported King James II and was attainted in 1691, with his titles forfeited. His son and heir apparent Robert MacCarty, Viscount Muskerry, served as Governor of Newfoundland but was excepted from the Indemnity Act 1747, which pardoned Jacobites.

The title was created for a second time in 1803 in favour of William Trench, 1st Viscount Dunlo. He had previously represented County Galway in the Irish Parliament and had already been created Baron Kilconnel, of Garbally in the County of Galway, in 1797, and Viscount Dunlo, of Dunlo and Ballinasloe in the Counties of Galway and Roscommon, in 1801. These titles were in the Peerage of Ireland. Trench was a descendant of a daughter of the first Viscount Muskerry, hence his choice of title when elevated to an earldom in 1803. Lord Clancarty had nineteen children and was succeeded by his eldest son, the second Earl. He was a prominent politician and diplomat. Lord Clancarty notably served as President of the Board of Trade and as Ambassador to The Netherlands and sat in the House of Lords as an Irish representative peer from 1808 to 1837. In 1815 he was created Baron Trench, of Garbally in the County of Galway, in the Peerage of the United Kingdom, and in 1823 he was further honoured when he was made Viscount Clancarty, of the County of Cork, also in the Peerage of the United Kingdom. On 8 July 1815 he was entered into the Netherlands Nobility by King William I of the Netherlands and granted by Royal Decree the title Marquess of Heusden (Dutch: Markies van Heusden).

Lord Clancarty's great-grandson, the fifth Earl, is notable for marrying an English music-hall singer Belle Bilton (1867–1906) in July 1889 against the opposition of his father who sold off much of the estate in retaliation. The fifth Earl's eldest son, the sixth Earl, died without surviving male issue and was succeeded by his younger brother, the seventh Earl (the fourth son of the first marriage of the fifth Earl). He died childless and was succeeded by his half-brother, the eighth Earl. He was a ufologist. As of 2017 the titles are held by his nephew, who succeeded in 1995. He is the only son of the Hon. Power Edward Ford Le Poer Trench, second son of the fifth Earl from his second marriage. The Earl of Clancarty sat in the House of Lords as Viscount Clancarty until the passing of the House of Lords Act 1999 and was re-elected as a Cross-Bench Peer on 23 June 2010.

Several other members of the Trench family have gained distinction. Eyre Trench, brother of the first Earl, was a Lieutenant-General in the Army. The Most Reverend the Hon. Power Trench, third son of the first Earl, was Archbishop of Tuam. The Hon. William Le Poer Trench, fourth son of the first Earl, was a Rear-Admiral in the Royal Navy. The Venerable the Hon. Charles Le Poer Trench, fifth son of the first Earl, was Archdeacon of Ardagh. His son Henry Luke Trench was a Major-General in the Bengal Staff Corps. The Hon. Sir Robert Le Poer Trench, ninth son of the first Earl, was a Colonel in the Army and a Knight Commander of the Order of the Bath. The Hon. William Le Poer Trench, third son of the third Earl, was a Colonel in the Royal Engineers and briefly represented County Galway in the House of Commons.

The Trench family claims French Huguenot descent, although a Scottish origin is possible. The Barons Ashtown are members of another branch of the family. William Trench, 1st Earl of Clancarty, was the great-grandson of Frederick Trench, whose brother the Very Reverend John Trench was the great-grandfather of Frederick Trench, 1st Baron Ashtown.

Trench Town in Jamaica gets its name from its previous designation as Trench Pen, 400 acres of land once used for livestock by Daniel Power Trench, an Irish immigrant of the 18th century (descendants of the Earls of Clancarty).

The family seat was Garbally Court, near Ballinasloe, County Galway.

== Earl of Clancarty, first creation ==
=== Viscount Muskerry (1628) ===
- Charles MacCarthy, 1st Viscount Muskerry (died 1641)
- Donough MacCarty, 2nd Viscount Muskerry (1594–1665) (created Earl of Clancarty in 1658)

=== Earl of Clancarty (1658) ===
- Donough MacCarty, 1st Earl of Clancarty (1594–1665)
- Charles MacCarty, 2nd Earl of Clancarty (died 1666)
- Callaghan MacCarty, 3rd Earl of Clancarty (died 1676)
- Donough MacCarthy, 4th Earl of Clancarty (1668–1734) (forfeit 1691)

== Earl of Clancarty, second creation ==
=== Baron Kilconnel (1797) ===
- William Power Keating Trench, 1st Baron Kilconnel (1741–1805) (created Viscount Dunlo in 1801)

=== Viscount Dunlo (1801) ===
- William Power Keating Trench, 1st Viscount Dunlo (1741–1805) (created Earl of Clancarty in 1803)

=== Earl of Clancarty (1803) ===
- William Power Keating Trench, 1st Earl of Clancarty (1741–1805)
- Richard Le Poer Trench, 2nd Earl of Clancarty (1767–1837) (created Marquess of Heusden in the nobility of the Netherlands in 1815)
- William Thomas Le Poer Trench, 3rd Earl of Clancarty (1803–1872)
- Richard Somerset Le Poer Trench, 4th Earl of Clancarty (1834–1891)
- William Frederick Le Poer Trench, 5th Earl of Clancarty (1868–1929)
- Richard Frederick John Donough Le Poer Trench, 6th Earl of Clancarty (1891–1971)
- Greville Sydney Rocheforte Le Poer Trench, 7th Earl of Clancarty (1902–1975)
- (William Francis) Brinsley Le Poer Trench, 8th Earl of Clancarty (1911–1995)
- Nicholas Power Richard Le Poer Trench, 9th Earl of Clancarty (b. 1952)

There is no heir to any of the titles.

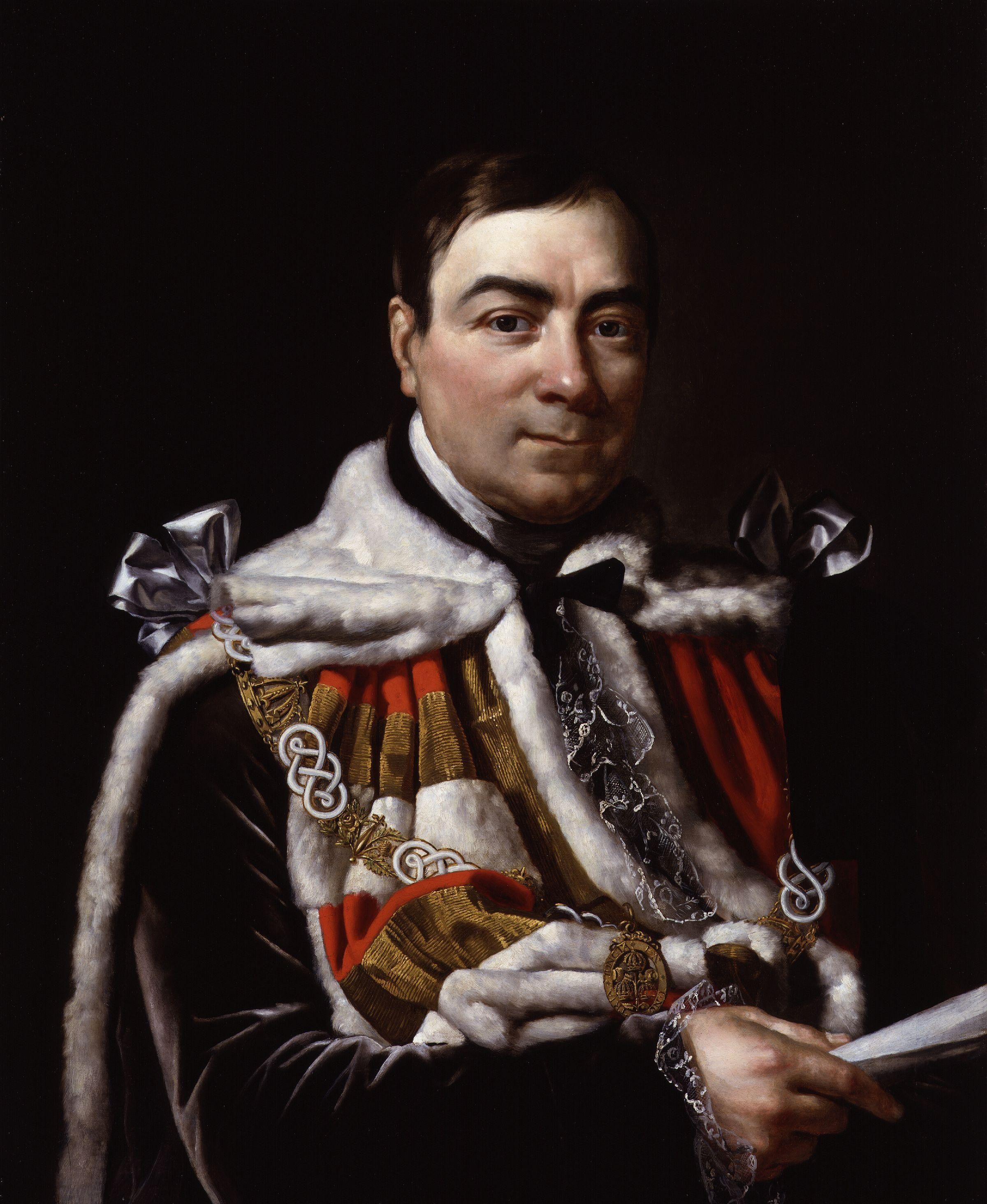
Richard Trench, 2nd Earl of Clancarty

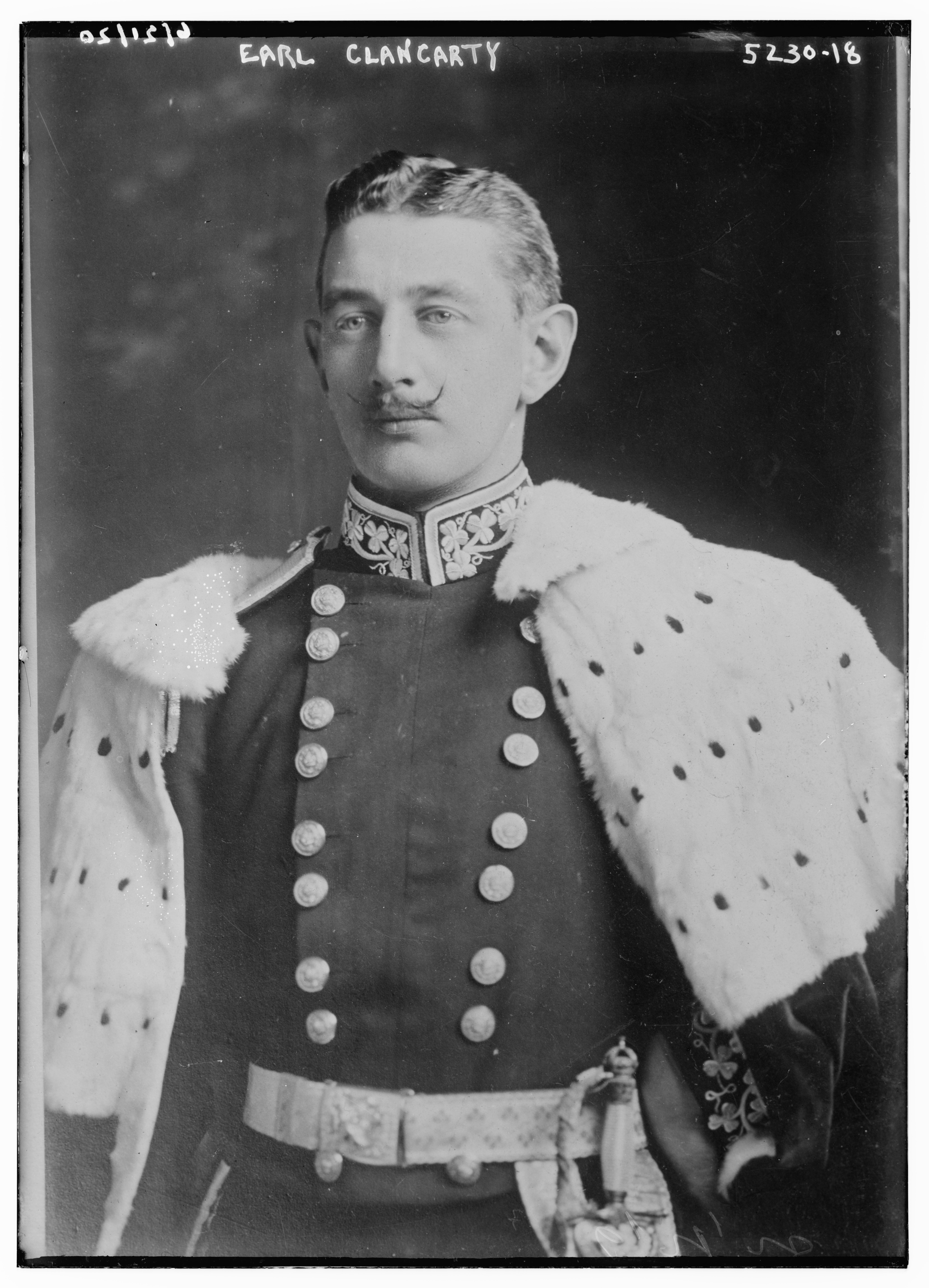
William Trench, 5th Earl of Clancarty

== See also ==
- Baron Ashtown

== Notes and references ==
- Cokayne, George Edward (1889). Complete Peerage of England, Scotland, Ireland, Great Britain and the United Kingdom, Extant, Extinct, or Dormant. Vol. 2 (1st ed.). London: George Bell and Sons. – Bra to C (for Clancarty)
- Cokayne, George Edward (1893). The complete peerage of England, Scotland, Ireland, Great Britain and the United Kingdom, extant, extinct, or dormant. Vol. 5 (1st ed.). London: George Bell and Sons. OCLC 1180836840. – L to M (for Muskerry)
