= Cosby Godolphin Trench =

British soldier and magistrate

The Honourable Cosby Godolphin Trench DL JP

High Sheriff of Tipperary
- In office 1886–1886
- Preceded by: Stephen Moore
- Succeeded by: John Vivian Ryan-Lenigan

Personal details
- Born: 6 January 1844
- Died: 9 December 1925 (aged 81)
- Spouse: Maria Musgrave (m. 1873)
- Relations: Nigel Trench, 7th Baron Ashtown (grandson)
- Children: 4
- Parent(s): Frederick Trench, 2nd Baron Ashtown; Harriet Georgiana Cosby
- Education: Eton College
- Alma mater: Corpus Christi College, Oxford

Cosby Godolphin Trench DL, JP (6 January 1844 – 9 December 1925), styled "the Honourable" from 1855, was a British soldier and magistrate.

== Early life ==
Trench was the second son of Frederick Trench, 2nd Baron Ashtown and his first wife Harriet Georgiana Cosby, youngest daughter of Thomas Cosby. His elder brother, Frederick Sydney Charles Trench, was married to Lady Anne Le Poer Trench, and his sister, Harriette Mary Trench, was married to Hon. Frederick Le Poer Trench, both children of William Trench, 3rd Earl of Clancarty and Lady Sarah Juliana Butler (eldest daughter of Somerset Butler, 3rd Earl of Carrick). After his mother's death in 1845, his father married Elizabeth Oliver Gascoigne (the second daughter of Richard Oliver Gascoigne, of Parlington Hall and Mary Turner, a daughter of Sir Charles Turner, 1st Baronet, of Kirkleatham). They spent much of the year at Castle Oliver.

Trench was educated at Eton College and then at Corpus Christi College, Oxford.

== Career ==
He entered the British Army as cornet in the 1st Dragoons in 1863, was promoted to captain in 1871 and retired five years later.

In 1886, he was appointed High Sheriff of Tipperary. He was Justice of the Peace for County Waterford as well as County Tipperary and represented the latter also as Deputy Lieutenant.

== Personal life ==
On 19 June 1873, he married Maria Musgrave, the eldest daughter of Sir Richard Musgrave, 4th Baronet of Tourin and Frances Mary Yates (a daughter of John Ashton Yates MP for County Carlow). Together, they were the parents of four sons:

- Charles Sadleir Musgrave Trench (1874–1958), a Capt. who married Helen Cowley Brown (d. 1937), fifth daughter of Robert Lidwill Brown of Clonboy, in 1914.
- Edward Cosby Trench (1881–1961), who married Evelyn de Courcy Daniell (d. 1965), eldest daughter of Col. de Courcy Daniell, in 1910.
- Clive Newcombe Trench (1884–1964), who married Kathleen Maud Marion MacIvor (d. 1979), second daughter of Maj. Ivar MacIvor, in 1910.
- Hubert Roland Trench (1887–1911), who died unmarried.

Trench died on 9 December 1925. His widow died on 4 November 1938.

=== Descendants ===
Through his eldest son, he was a grandfather of Cosby Patrick Musgrave Trench (1915–1983), who married Julia Violetta May Whiting (widow of Frank Louis Whiting and daughter of Frank Porch), in 1956.

Through his third son Clive, he was a grandfather Nigel Clive Cosby Trench, 7th Baron Ashtown, who inherited Cosby's father's barony in 1990 from his first cousin once removed. Lord Ashtowon married Marcelle Cathrine van Kloetinge (d. 1994), the youngest daughter of Johan Jacob Clotterbooke Patyn van Kloetinge, of Zeist, The Netherlands, in 1939. They were the parents of Roderick Nigel Godolphin Trench, 8th Baron Ashtown. After his wife's death in 1994, the 7th Baron married Dorothea Mary Elizabeth (née Minchin) von Pless (the former wife of Hans Heinrich XVII Wilhelm Albert Eduard, 4th Prince of Pless and a daughter of Lt.-Col. Richard George Edward Minchin), in 1997. He was also a grandfather of Hon. Lois Eileen Trench, the wife of Capt. Charles Algernon Mackintosh-Walker (eldest son of Thomas Charles Bruce Mackintosh-Walker of Geddes House), in 1937.
