= Trench (disambiguation) =

A trench is a narrow depression in the ground.

Trench or Trenches may also refer to:

== Arts, entertainment, and media ==
- Trench (album), a 2018 album by Twenty One Pilots
- "Trenches" (Pop Evil song), 2013
- Trenches (Monica and Lil Baby song), 2020
- Trenches (video game), a 2009 game for iPhone/iPod
- Trenches (web series), a 2010 sci-fi TV series

== Biology and healthcare ==
- Trench fever (also known as "five-day fever", "quintan fever" febris quintana in Latin, and "urban trench fever"), a moderately serious disease transmitted by body lice
- Trench foot, also known as immersion foot, a medical condition caused by prolonged exposure of the feet to damp and cold
- Trench mouth, acute necrotizing ulcerative gingivitis

== Other uses ==
- Trench (surname) includes list of people with the name
- Trench, Telford, Shropshire, England
  - Trench Crossing railway station, a former station in Shropshire
- Oceanic trench, a topographic depression of the sea floor
- Trench coat, a type of coat garment originally worn in trench warfare
- Trench Town, Jamaica
- Trench warfare, the kind of warfare defined by fortified earth defences

== See also ==
- Entrenchment (disambiguation), related terms
- Trenchard (disambiguation)
- Trencher (disambiguation)
- Trenchmouth
- The Trench (disambiguation)
