= Brinsley Trench, 8th Earl of Clancarty =

Dutch noble (1911–1995)

The Right Honourable The Earl of Clancarty

Member of the House of Lords
- Lord Temporal
- In office 15 September 1975 – 18 May 1995
- Preceded by: The 7th Earl of Clancarty
- Succeeded by: The 9th Earl of Clancarty

Personal details
- Born: William Francis Brinsley Le Poer Trench; 18 September 1911
- Died: 18 May 1995 (aged 83) Bexhill-on-Sea, East Sussex, England
- Parents: William Trench, 5th Earl of Clancarty; Mary Gwatkin Ellis

William Francis Brinsley Le Poer Trench, 8th Earl of Clancarty, 7th Marquess of Heusden (18 September 1911 – 18 May 1995), was a prominent ufologist. He was an Irish peer, as well as a nobleman in the Dutch nobility.

== Biography ==
He was the fifth son of William Frederick Le Poer Trench, 5th Earl of Clancarty, by Mary Gwatkin Ellis. He had four older half-brothers born to the 5th Earl's first wife, Isabel Maud Penrice Bilton, the actress known as Belle Bilton, who died of cancer in 1906. Brinsley was educated at the Pangbourne Nautical College.

From 1956 to 1959 Clancarty edited the Flying Saucer Review and founded the International Unidentified Object Observer Corps. He also found employment selling advertising space for a gardening magazine housed opposite Waterloo station.

In 1967, he founded Contact International and served as its first president. He also served as vice-president of the British UFO Research Association (BUFORA). Clancarty was an honorary life member of the now defunct Ancient Astronauts Society which supported the ideas put forward by Erich von Däniken in his 1968 book Chariots of the Gods?.

In 1975 he succeeded to the earldom on the death of his half-brother, Greville Trench, 7th Earl of Clancarty, giving him a seat in the British Parliament. He used his new position to found a UFO Study Group at the House of Lords, introducing Flying Saucer Review to its library and pushing for the declassification of UFO data.

Four years later he organised a celebrated debate in the House of Lords on UFOs which attracted many speeches on both sides of the question. In one debate, Lord Strabolgi, for the Government, declared that there was nothing to convince him that any alien spacecraft had ever visited the Earth.

== Private life ==
Clancarty first married, in 1940, Diana (1919–1999), daughter of Sir William Younger, Bt. This marriage was dissolved in 1947. He married secondly, in 1961, Mrs Wilma Belknap (née Vermilyea) (1915–1995) and that marriage was dissolved in 1969. His third marriage was in 1974, to Mrs Mildred Allewyn Spong (née Bensusan) (1895–1975). She died in 1975 but Clancarty remarried a fourth time, in 1976, to Mrs May Beasley (née Radonicich) (1904–2003).

He lived most of his life in South Kensington and died in Bexhill-on-Sea in 1995, leaving his extensive collection of papers to Contact International.

He was succeeded to the earldom by his nephew Nicholas Trench (born 1952).

== Hollow Earth theory ==
In 1974, Trench published Secret of the Ages: UFOs from Inside the Earth, a book which theorised that the centre of the Earth was hollow, with entrances to its interior located at both the north and south polar areas. The interior, he suggested, consisted of large tunnel systems connecting a large cavern world. Trench also believed that the lost continent of Atlantis actually once existed and that these tunnels were probably constructed all over the world by the Atlanteans, for various purposes.

Trench believed that there was no actual North Pole, but instead a large area with a warm sea dipping gradually into the interior of the Earth. He said that humans were 'living on the deck of a ship, unaware of the life going on under our feet'. One argument he put forward for this theory was that whilst the Earth is spherical, it is flattened at the poles. Additionally, he questioned how all icebergs could be composed of frozen fresh water, if no rivers were flowing from the inside of the Earth to the outside. He had also suggested that a large proportion of unidentified flying objects (UFOs) emanated from the Earth's interior. These objects were likely to have been created by a group of much more technically advanced beings, similar to humans, but a group that likely possessed extrasensory abilities, as well as the ability to manipulate psychic phenomena. Another argument for the Hollow Earth theory was that everything he suggested, nebulae, comets and planets, are hollow and these conditions would certainly prove favourable for a hollow Earth.

Whilst Trench had in one of his earlier books disregarded the Hollow Earth theory, he admitted to at the time 'being educated along with millions of other people to believe that the Earth had a liquid molten core'.

== Other claims ==
According to Trench in his book The Sky People, Adam and Eve, Noah and many of the other characters from the Bible originally lived on Mars. Trench believed that Adam and Eve were experimental creations of extraterrestrials. His claim was that the Biblical description of the Garden of Eden was inconsistent with what was on Earth and as Mars contained canals, that the Garden of Eden must have been located on Mars. He further claimed that the north polar ice cap melted on Mars, and this caused the descendants of Adam and Eve to move to Earth.

Trench also claimed to know a former U.S. test pilot who said he was one of six persons present at a meeting between President Eisenhower and a group of aliens, which allegedly took place at Edwards Air Force Base on 4 April 1954. Clancarty reported that the test pilot told him "Five different alien craft landed at the base. Three were saucer-shaped and two were cigar shaped... the aliens looked something like humans, but not exactly."

He claimed that he could trace his descent from 63,000 BC, when beings from other planets had landed on Earth in spaceships.

== Bibliography ==
- The Sky People (1960)
- Men Among Mankind (1962)
- Forgotten Heritage (1964)
- The Flying Saucer Story (1966)
- Operation Earth (1969)
- The Eternal Subject (1973)
- Secret of the Ages: UFO's from Inside the Earth (1974).
- Reptiles from the Internal World (1979)
- China in the Closet: A Romantic Mystery (1981)
- Egos and Sub-Egos (1983)
- UFOs: Just Shiny Birds? with Anna Robb (1984).

Peerage of Ireland
Preceded by Greville Trench	Earl of Clancarty; 2nd creation 1975–1995	Succeeded by Nicholas Trench
Peerage of the United Kingdom
Preceded by Greville Trench	Viscount Clancarty; 1975–1995; Member of the House of Lords (1975–1995)	Succeeded by Nicholas Trench
Preceded by Greville Trench	Baron Trench; 1975–1995	Succeeded by Nicholas Trench
Dutch nobility
Preceded by Greville Trench	Marquess of Heusden; 1975–1995	Succeeded by Nicholas Trench
