= The Trench =

The Trench may refer to:

- The Trench (Dix), a 1923 painting by Otto Dix that was confiscated by the Nazis and later lost
- The Trench (novel), a 1999 novel by Steve Alten
- The Trench (film), a 1999 film
- The Trench (comics), a fictional comic species
  - The Trench, an unproduced film based on the comics, see Aquaman (film) § Unproduced spin-off
- The Trench, a 1991 novel by Abdul Rahman Munif
- Meg 2: The Trench, a 2023 science fiction action film distributed by Warner Bros. Pictures

== See also ==
- Trench (disambiguation)
