= Belle Bilton =

English music-hall entertainer

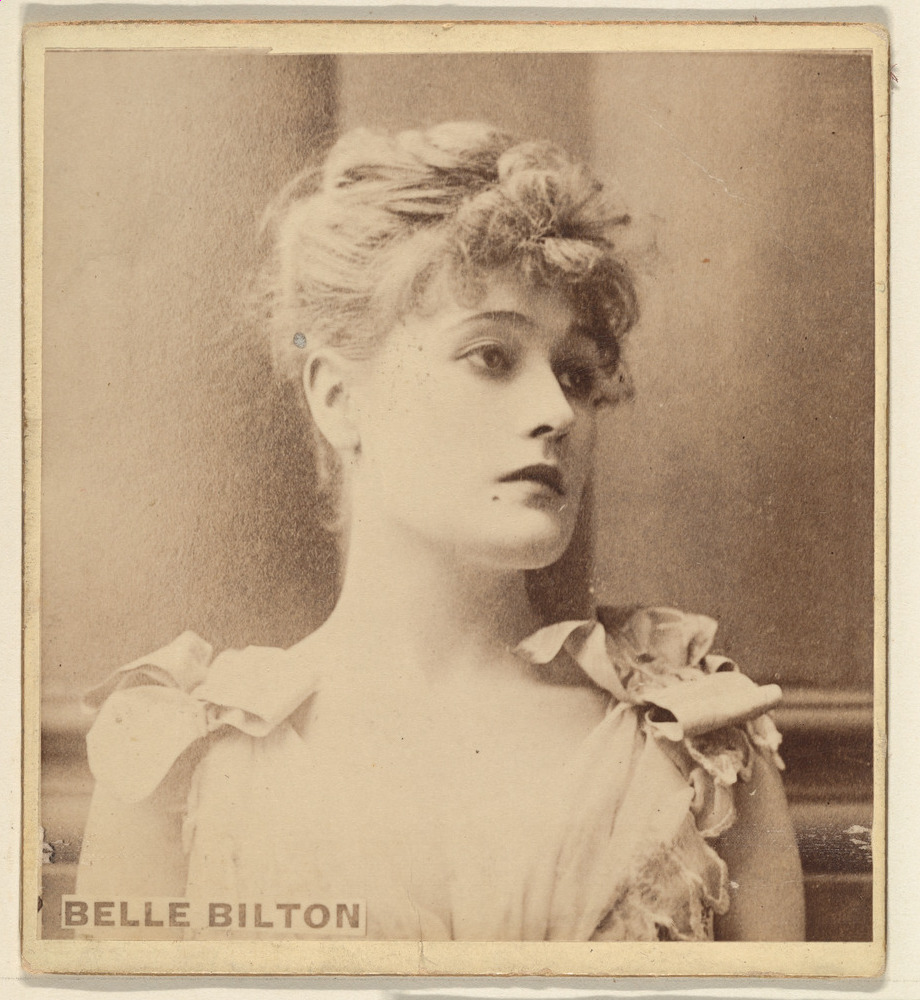
- Circa 1890
- Born: Isabel Maud Penrice Bilton; 29 October 1866; Newington, London, England
- Died: 31 December 1906 (aged 40); Garbally Park, Ballinasloe, Ireland
- Other name: Lady Dunlo
- Spouse: William Trench, 5th Earl of Clancarty (m. 1889)
- Children: 6

Isabel Maud Penrice, Countess of Clancarty (née Bilton; 26 October 1866 – 31 December 1906), known as Belle Bilton, was an English music hall and pantomime actress. She performed at a number of venues and modeled for photography studios. She also formed a duo with her sister Flo Bilton. She gained further media attention for her marriage to William Trench, Viscount Dunlo.

== Early life ==
Isabel Maud Penrice Bilton was the middle daughter of John George Bilton, a member of the Royal Engineers, and Kate Maude (née Penrice). She and her younger sister Florence (born 1868) got their start performing at the local Woolwich Barracks near their home in Charlton. At the time of her wedding, Bilton was recorded living in St John's Wood with her older sister Violet (born 1865).

== Career ==
Bilton began her theatre career at age 14. In 1883, Bilton's earnings on the stage were "five and thirty shillings". As early as 1886, Bilton and her sister Flo were referred to as the Sisters Bilton in press billings, performing at theatres including the "London Pavilion, the Oxford, the Holborn, the Paragon". They earned publicity through photographs taken by the likes of Bassano Studios and W. & D. Downey.

Bilton featured in Babes in the Wood alongside her sister in December 1889 at the Prince's Theatre, Manchester and starred as the titular role of Venus at the Theatre Royal, Plymouth in 1890. At the end of 1890 and start of 1891, she featured with Vesta Tilley and Dan Leno in Augustus Harris' pantomime Beauty and the Beast at the Theatre Royal Drury Lane. She also appeared in Blue Beard at the Theatre Royal, Glasgow.

In addition to acting, Bilton became an oil painter and had her work exhibited at Bond Street's Continental Gallery.

== Personal life ==
In July 1888, Bilton had a son out of wedlock at Maidenhead with an American-born man named Alden Carter Weston. Weston had unsuccessfully attempted to divorce his wife Charlotte (née Campbell) around 1887 and went to prison twice. Bilton came to rely on the support of art dealer Isidor Emanuel Wertheimer. She, her sister Violet and brother-in-law William Roberts subsequently moved into St John's Wood while the child was fostered elsewhere.

At the Corinthian club in May 1889, Bilton caught the eye of the William Trench, Viscount Dunlo, the Irish heir to the earldom of Clancarty. They eloped in Hampstead on 10 July 1889. She was 22, while he was 20. His father Richard Trench, 4th Earl of Clancarty disapproved of the match, finding the nature of Bilton's career and past scandalous. He responded by sending Dunlo abroad to Australia on threat of his allowance, leaving Bilton penniless.

In her husband's absence, Bilton continued to act and despite the scandal, her popularity and sympathy from the public did not wane. After discovering her connection to Wertheimer, Dunlo's father coerced him into filing for divorce via affidavit in March 1890 on adultery charges, with the trial beginning in July. No evidence was found for the charges, and Dunlo declared his belief his wife innocent. Dunlo was subsequently cut off from his father's allowance, and the couple lived off of the earnings from Bilton's theatre career.

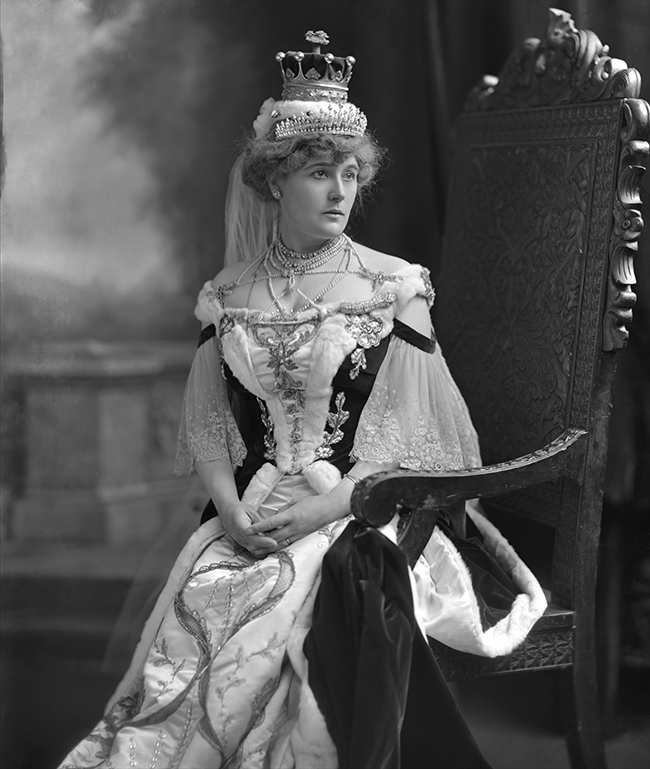
Bilton in 1902

In May 1891, Dunlo inherited the earldom upon his father's death, and Bilton became Countess of Clancarty. The couple had five children.

== Death ==
Bilton fell ill in 1904 and died from cancer at the end of 1906 at Garbally Park in Ballinasloe, Ireland.

== Legacy ==
Bilton was the subject of a 2018 novel by the Irish writer Nuala O'Connell titled Becoming Belle.
