= Nicholas Trench, 9th Earl of Clancarty =

Anglo-Irish peer and writer

The Right Honourable The Earl of Clancarty
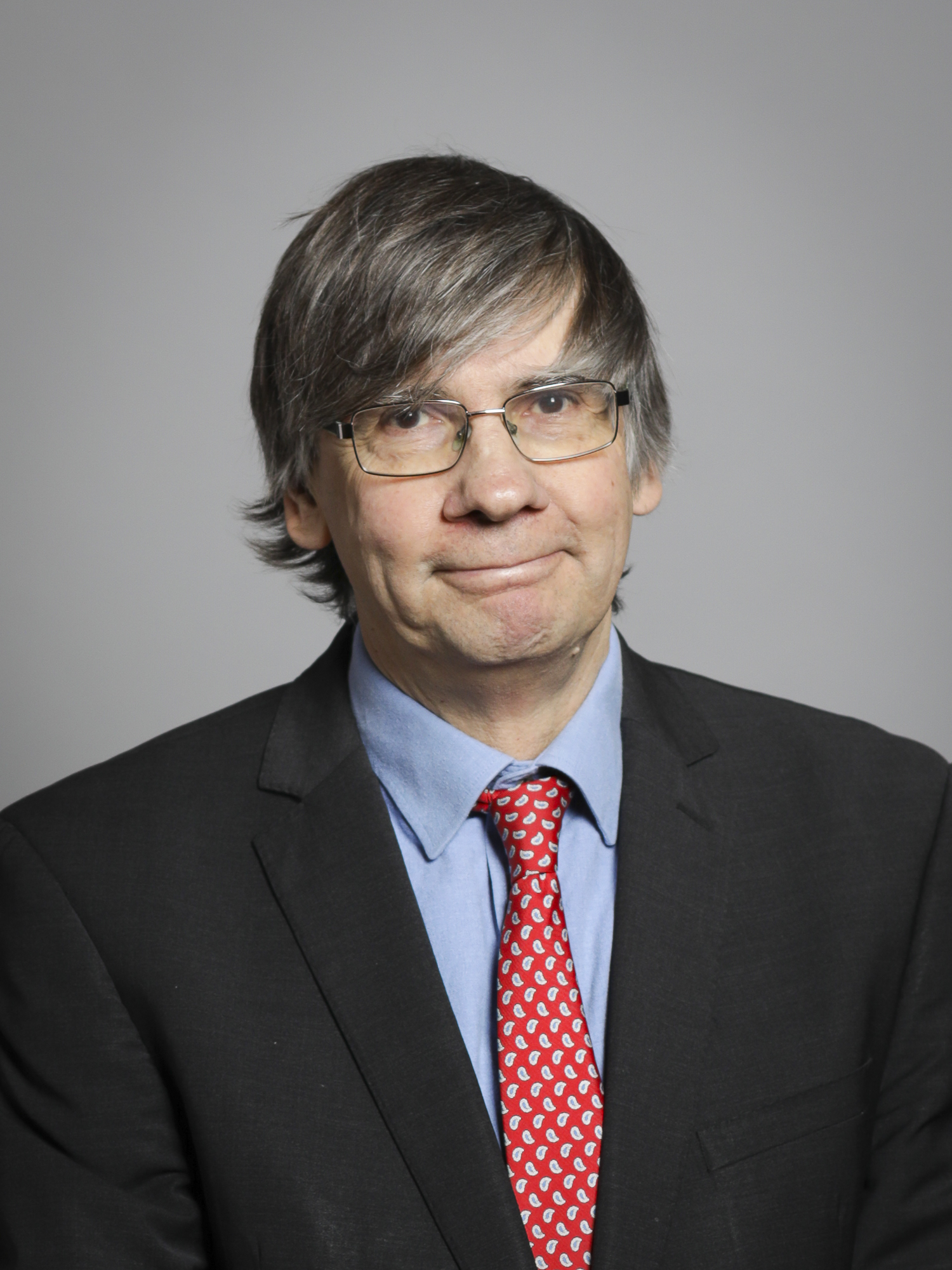
- Official portrait, 2019

Member of the House of Lords Lord Temporal
- Incumbent
- Life peerage 4 June 2026
- Elected Hereditary Peer; 28 June 2010 – 29 April 2026
- By-election: 2010
- Preceded by: The 4th Viscount Colville of Culross
- Succeeded by: Seat abolished
- Hereditary peerage 29 March 1996 – 11 November 1999
- Preceded by: The 8th Earl of Clancarty
- Succeeded by: Seat abolished

Personal details
- Born: Nicholas Power Richard Le Poer Trench; 1 May 1952 (age 74)
- Party: Crossbench
- Education: Westminster School

Nicholas Power Richard Le Poer Trench, 9th Earl of Clancarty, Baron Clancarty of the Hangers, 8th Marquess of Heusden (born 1 May 1952), is an Anglo-Irish hereditary peer, as well as a nobleman in the Dutch nobility. Lord Clancarty served as an elected Crossbench hereditary peer in the British House of Lords. In May 2026, it was announced he was to be given one of 26 new life peerages, returning him to the House of Lords after the coming into force of the House of Lords (Hereditary Peers) Act 2026.

His earldom is in the Peerage of Ireland.

== Early life and education ==
Lord Clancarty was born in Uxbridge on 1 May 1952, the only son of the Hon. Power Edward Ford Le Poer Trench, second son of William Trench, 5th Earl of Clancarty, from his second marriage. He was educated at Westminster School. He also studied at Ashford Grammar School, Plymouth Polytechnic (now University of Plymouth), the University of Colorado in Denver and the University of Sheffield.

== Membership of House of Lords ==
In 1995, Clancarty succeeded to the earldom and other titles on the death of his childless uncle, Brinsley Trench, 8th Earl of Clancarty. He took his seat in the House of Lords at this time as Viscount Clancarty, a title in the Peerage of the United Kingdom, because titles in the Peerage of Ireland did not entitle their holders to sit even before the House of Lords Act 1999 removed the majority of hereditary peers.

Under the terms of that Act, Clancarty lost his automatic right to a seat. He was unsuccessful in the election by the Crossbench hereditary peers of 28 of their number to continue to sit after the Act came into force, finishing 37th in a field of 79 candidates.

He was an unsuccessful candidate in four by-elections caused by the deaths of sitting hereditary peers, being runner-up on two occasions. In 2010 he returned to the House after winning the by-election to replace the 4th Viscount Colville of Culross.

Besides being a British and an Irish peer, he also belongs to the Dutch nobility as Marquess of Heusden. Other than King Willem-Alexander of the Netherlands, who is also Marquis of Veere and Flushing, Lord Clancarty holds the only extant Dutch marquessate.

Clancarty was removed again in April 2026 from the House of Lords as part of the House of Lords (Hereditary Peers) Act 2026, but was returned to the House as a life peer when he was created as Baron Clancarty of the Hangers, of Petersfield in the County of Hampshire on 4 June 2026.

== Career ==
Clancarty is a self-employed artist, freelance writer, and translator.

== Marriage and children ==
Lord Clancarty is married to the journalist Victoria Lambert. They have one daughter:

- Lady Rowena Elizabeth Joy Le Poer Trench (born 2005)

There is no heir to the earldom or to any of the other titles.

== Notes ==
Parliament of the United Kingdom
Preceded by The Viscount Colville of Culross	Elected hereditary peer to the House of Lords under the House of Lords Act 1999 (sitting as Viscount Clancarty); 2010–2026	Position abolished under the House of Lords (Hereditary Peers) Act 2026
Peerage of Ireland
Preceded by Brinsley Trench	Earl of Clancarty; 2nd creation 1996–present	Incumbent
Peerage of the United Kingdom
Preceded by Brinsley Trench	Viscount Clancarty; 1995–present Member of the House of Lords (1996–1999)	Incumbent
Preceded by Brinsley Trench	Baron Trench; 1995–present	Incumbent
Dutch nobility
Preceded by Brinsley Trench	Marquess of Heusden; 1995–present	Incumbent
