= Marquess of Heusden =

Marquess of Heusden Markies van Heusden
- Arms of the Earls of Clancarty as Marquess of Heusden.
- Creation date: 8 July 1815
- Created by: King William I
- Peerage: Dutch nobility
- First holder: Richard Trench, 2nd Earl of Clancarty
- Present holder: Nicholas Trench, 9th Earl of Clancarty
- Remainder to: the 2nd Earls's heirs male of the body lawfully begotten
- Subsidiary titles: Earl of Clancarty, Viscount Dunlo, Viscount Clancarty, Baron Kilconnel, Baron Trench
- Motto: Virtutis Fortuna Comes

Marquess of Heusden (Dutch: Markies van Heusden) is a high-ranking Dutch title of nobility retained by the Earl of Clancarty.

The 2nd Earl of Clancarty, an Anglo-Irish peer, was credited with resolving various border disputes in the Netherlands, Germany and Italy at the Congress of Vienna (1814 – 1815) and in his role as Ambassador to the Netherlands. For his service as ambassador to The Hague, he was raised into the Dutch nobility with the creation of the hereditary title Markies van Heusden (Marquess of Heusden) by King Willem I of the Netherlands (royal decree 8 July 1815 no. 14).

== Nobility ==
The 2nd Earl of Clancarty and all his descendants along the male line belong to the Dutch nobility, in which all the descendant Earls have the title of Marquess of Heusden; the remainder of the descendants carry the Dutch honorific style of Jonkheer or Jonkvrouw.

Only two non-Dutch lineages living outside of the Netherlands have been raised into the Dutch nobility: the Le Poer Trench family and the Wellesley family, with the Duke of Wellington as the Prince of Waterloo.

== Marquesse of Heusden (1815) ==
- Richard Le Poer Trench, 1st Marquess of Heusden (1767–1837) 1815-1837
- William Thomas Le Poer Trench, 2nd Marquess of Heusden (1803–1872) 1837-1872
- Richard Somerset Le Poer Trench, 3rd Marquess of Heusden (1834–1891) 1872-1891
- William Frederick Le Poer Trench, 4th Marquess of Heusden (1868–1929) 1891-1929
- Richard Frederick John Donough Le Poer Trench, 5th Marquess of Heusden (1891–1971) 1929-1971
- Greville Sydney Rocheforte Le Poer Trench, 6th Marquess of Heusden (1902–1975) 1971-1975
- (William Francis) Brinsley Le Poer Trench, 7th Marquess of Heusden (1911–1995) 1975-1995
- Nicholas Power Richard Le Poer Trench, 8th Marquess of Heusden (b. 1952) since 1995

There is no heir to the marquessate.
