= Richard Trench, 4th Earl of Clancarty =

Irish noble

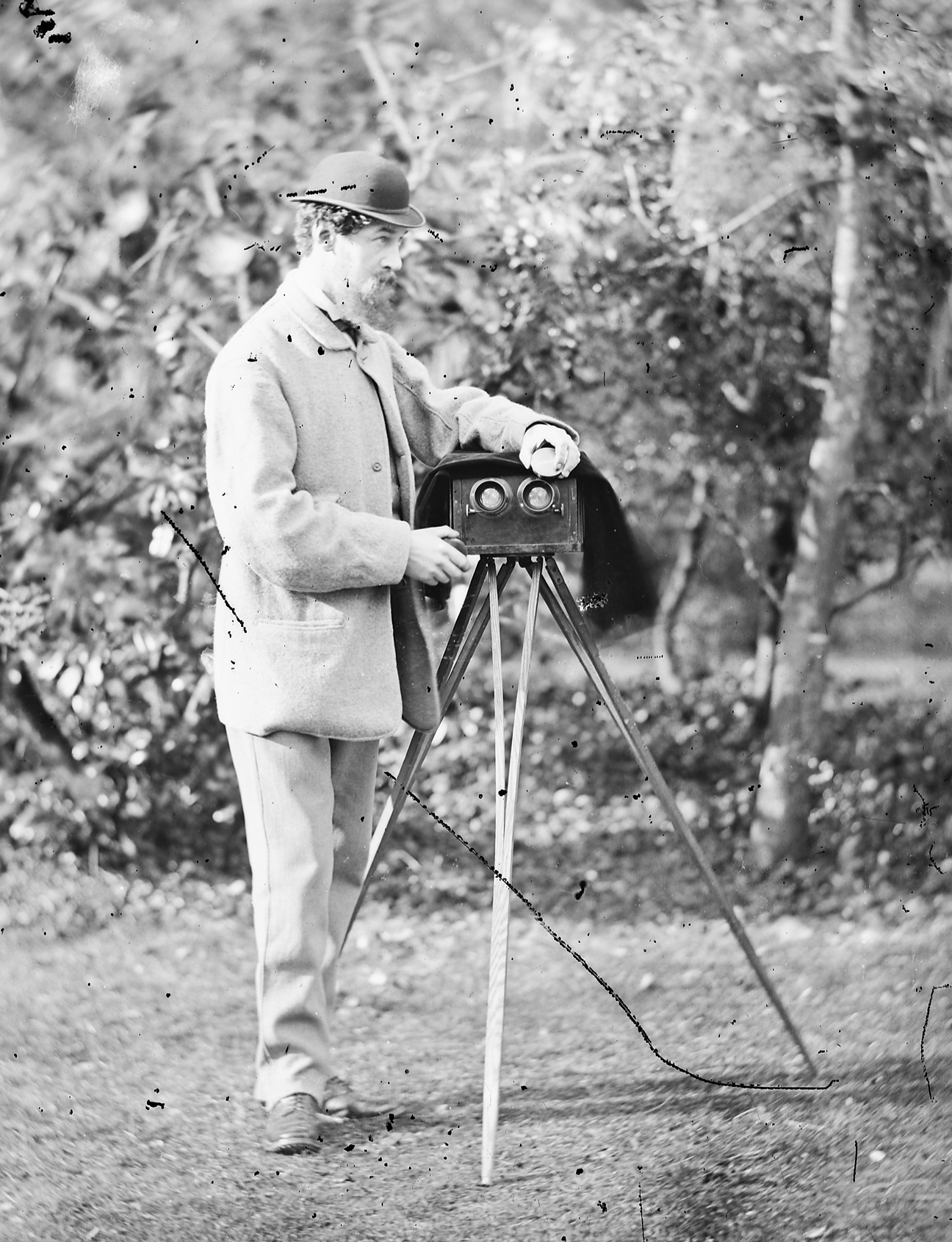
Lord Dunlo with a stereo camera, 20 February 1864

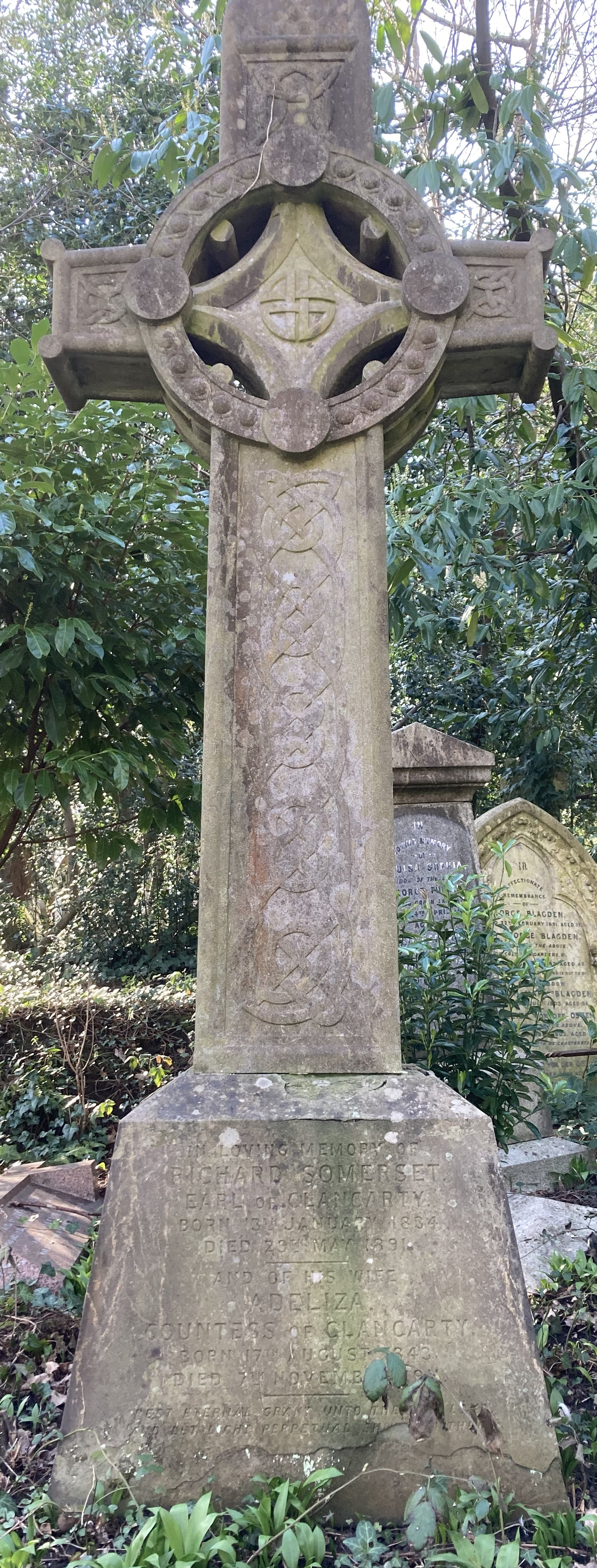
Grave of the 4th Earl of Clancarty in Highgate Cemetery (west side)

Richard Somerset Le Poer Trench, 4th Earl of Clancarty, 3rd Marquess of Heusden (13 January 1834 – 29 May 1891), styled Viscount Dunlo between 1837 and 1872, was an Irish peer, as well a nobleman in the Dutch nobility.

== Biography ==
He was born in Dublin, Ireland, the son of William Trench, 3rd Earl of Clancarty, and Lady Sarah Juliana Butler. On 29 November 1866, he married Lady Adeliza Georgiana Hervey, daughter of Frederick William Hervey, 2nd Marquess of Bristol, and Lady Katherine Isabella Manners.

They had three children:

- William Frederick Le Poer Trench, 5th Earl of Clancarty (29 December 1868 – 16 February 1929)
- Lady Katherine Anne Le Poer Trench (12 August 1871 – 25 February 1953)
- The Hon. Richard John Le Poer Trench (25 December 1877 – 10 August 1960).

He is buried with his wife Adeliza on the western side of Highgate Cemetery.

Peerage of Ireland
Preceded by William Thomas Le Poer Trench	Earl of Clancarty; 2nd creation 1872–1891	Succeeded by William Frederick Le Poer Trench
Dutch nobility
Preceded by William Thomas Le Poer Trench	Marquess of Heusden; 1872–1891	Succeeded by William Frederick Le Poer Trench
