= Trencher =

Trencher may refer to:

- Trencher (comics), a comic book series
- Trencher (machine), a digging machine
- Trencher (tableware), a place setting item (originally a flat round of bread)
- Trencher cap, a square academic cap
- Trencher (band), a London-based Casio-core band
