= Power Henry Le Poer Trench =

British diplomat

The Honourable Power Henry Le Poer Trench

British Minister to Japan
- In office 1894–1895
- Monarch: Victoria
- Prime Minister: The Earl of Rosebery
- Preceded by: Hugh Fraser
- Succeeded by: Sir Ernest Mason Satow

Personal details
- Born: 11 May 1841
- Died: 30 April 1899 (aged 57)
- Parents: William Thomas Le Poer Trench, 3rd Earl of Clancarty (father); Lady Sarah Juliana Butler (mother)

Power Henry Le Poer Trench (11 May 1841 – 30 April 1899) was a British diplomat.

Trench was the son of William Thomas Le Poer Trench, 3rd Earl of Clancarty and Lady Sarah Juliana Butler.

== Career ==
Trench was Secretary of the British Embassy in Berlin between 1888 and 1893.

In Mexico, he was the Envoy Extraordinary and Minister Plenipotentiary between 1893 and 1894.

He was the British Minister in Tokyo in 1894-1895.

He is buried in the family vault at Highgate Cemetery.

== See also ==
- List of Ambassadors from the United Kingdom to Japan
- Anglo-Japanese relations

== Notes ==
Diplomatic posts
Preceded by Hugh Fraser	British Minister to Japan; 1894–1895	Succeeded by Sir Ernest Mason Satow
