= Frederick Trench, 2nd Baron Ashtown =

Irish peer

The Right Honourable The Lord Ashtown DL

High Sheriff of County Galway
- In office 1840–1840
- Preceded by: Sir John Burke, Bt
- Succeeded by: Andrew William Blake

Personal details
- Born: Frederick Mason Trench; 25 December 1804
- Died: 12 September 1880 (aged 75)
- Spouses: Harriet Georgiana Cosby (m. 1831; died 1845) Elizabeth Oliver Gascoigne (after 1852)
- Relations: Frederick Trench, 1st Baron Ashtown (uncle); Frederick Trench, 3rd Baron Ashtown (grandson)
- Children: 5, including Cosby
- Education: University of Cambridge

Frederick Mason Trench, 2nd Baron Ashtown DL (25 December 1804 – 12 September 1880) was an Irish peer and magistrate.

== Early life ==
He was son of Francis Trench and his wife Mary Mason, second daughter of Henry Mason, and nephew to Frederick Trench, 1st Baron Ashtown.

== Career ==
While his claim to his uncle's title was admitted only in 1855, he actually succeeded per special remainder on the latter's death in 1840. Trench was educated at the University of Cambridge. He was appointed High Sheriff of County Galway for 1840 and represented the county as Deputy Lieutenant.

== Personal life ==
On 29 August 1831, he married firstly Harriet Georgiana Cosby, youngest daughter of Thomas Cosby, of Stradbally Hall and his wife Charlotte Elizabeth Kelly (daughter of Rt. Hon. Thomas Kelly, Second Justice of the Common Pleas of Ireland). Together, they were the parents of two daughters and three sons, including:

- Hon. Charlotte Elizabeth Trench (1832–1854), who died unmarried.
- Hon. Frederick Sydney Charles Trench (1839–1879), who married Lady Anne Le Poer Trench, eldest daughter of William Trench, 3rd Earl of Clancarty and Lady Sarah Juliana Butler (eldest daughter of Somerset Butler, 3rd Earl of Carrick), in 1867.
- Hon. Cosby Godolphin Trench (1844–1925), who married Maria Musgrave, eldest daughter of Sir Richard Musgrave, 4th Baronet of Tourin and Frances Mary Yates (a daughter of John Ashton Yates MP for County Carlow), in 1873.
- Hon. Harriette Mary Trench (d. 1884), who married, as his first wife, Maj. Hon. Frederick Le Poer Trench (1835-1913), second son of the 3rd Earl of Clancarty, in 1883. Frederick was the older brother of her brother's wife Lady Anne.

After his first wife's death on 25 February 1845, he married Elizabeth Oliver Gascoigne in Aberford on 10 February 1852. She was the second daughter of Richard Oliver Gascoigne, of Parlington Hall and Mary Turner (daughter of Sir Charles Turner, 1st Baronet, of Kirkleatham). He lived much of the year at Castle Oliver, which was built in 1845 by his second wife and her sister Isabella.

Trench died, aged 75, at Clonodfoy (otherwise known as Castle Oliver) and was buried at the family's mausoleum at Woodlawn, County Galway, a week later. His older son Frederick having predeceased him in 1879, he was succeeded in the barony by his grandson Frederick. His second surviving son Cosby, who inherited Castle Oliver, was a soldier and magistrate.

Peerage of Ireland
Preceded by Frederick Trench	Baron Ashtown claim admitted in 1855; 1840–1880	Succeeded by Frederick Trench
