= William Trench, 3rd Earl of Clancarty =

Irish peer

William Thomas Le Poer Trench, 3rd Earl of Clancarty, 2nd Marquess of Heusden (21 September 1803 – 26 April 1872), styled Viscount Dunlo between 1805 and 1837, was an Irish peer, as well a nobleman in the Dutch nobility. He was educated at St John's College, Cambridge.

Trench was born in Castleton, County Kildare, Ireland the son of Richard Trench, 2nd Earl of Clancarty and Henrietta Margaret Staples. On 8 September 1832, he married Lady Sarah Juliana Butler. They had six children.

- Richard Somerset Le Poer Trench, 4th Earl of Clancarty (13 January 1834 – 29 May 1891) married Lady Adeliza Georgiana Hervey
- Major Hon. Frederick Le Poer Trench (10 February 1835 – 17 December 1913) married (1) Harriet Mary Trench (2) Catherine Simpson
- Colonel William Le Poer Trench (17 June 1837 – 16 September 1920) married Harriet Maria Georgina Martins
- Lady Anne Le Poer Trench (1839 – 12 March 1924) married Frederic Sydney Charles Trench
- Power Henry Le Poer Trench (11 May 1841 – 30 April 1899)
- Lady Sarah Emily Grace Le Poer Trench (6 December 1843 – 2 August 1875) married John Melville Hatchell.

Peerage of Ireland
Preceded by Richard Le Poer Trench	Earl of Clancarty; 2nd creation 1837–1872	Succeeded by Richard Somerset Le Poer Trench
Dutch nobility
Preceded by Richard Le Poer Trench	Marquess of Heusden; 1837–1872	Succeeded by Richard Somerset Le Poer Trench
