= Baron Ashtown =

Title in the Peerage of Ireland

Barony of Ashtown
- Argent, a lion passant gules, between three fleurs-de-lis azure, on a chief of the last a sun in splendour or
- Creation date: 27 December 1800
- Created by: King George III
- Peerage: Peerage of Ireland
- First holder: Frederick Trench, 1st Baron Ashtown
- Present holder: Roderick Trench, 8th Baron Ashtown
- Heir apparent: Hon. Timothy Roderick Hamilton Trench
- Remainder to: 1st Baron's heirs male of the body lawfully begotten, with remainder failing heirs male of his body to the heirs male of the body of his father.
- Former seat: Woodlawn House
- Motto: Virtutis fortuna comes ("Fortune is the companion of virtue")

Baron Ashtown, of Moate in the County of Galway, is a title in the Peerage of Ireland. It was created in 1800 for Frederick Trench, with remainder to the heirs male of his father.

Trench had previously represented Portarlington from 1798 in the Irish House of Commons. He was succeeded according to the special remainder by his nephew, the second Baron (the son of Francis Trench) – see Frederick Trench, 2nd Baron Ashtown. His grandson, the third Baron (son of Frederic Sydney Charles Trench, eldest son of the second Baron), sat in the House of Lords as an Irish representative peer from 1908 to 1915. On the death of his younger son, the fifth Baron, this line of the family failed. The late Baron was succeeded by his first cousin once removed, the sixth Baron. He was the grandson of the Hon. William Cosby Trench, younger brother of the third Baron. However, he never married and on his death in 1990 this branch of the family also failed. The title was inherited by his second cousin once removed, the seventh Baron. He was the grandson of Hon. Cosby Godolphin Trench, second son of the second Baron and served as Ambassador to South Korea and to Portugal. As of 2017, the title is held by the seventh Baron's son, the eighth Baron.

Another member of the Trench family was Sir David Clive Crosbie Trench, Governor of Hong Kong from 1964 to 1971. He was a descendant of John Trench, younger brother of the first Baron Ashtown.

The family seat was Woodlawn House, near Ballinasloe, County Galway. Woodlawn House was sold by the 4th Baron in 1947 and is still extant, although semi-derelict. It is currently in the process of being gradually restored.

== Barons Ashtown (1800) ==
- Frederick Trench, 1st Baron Ashtown (1755–1840)
- Frederick Mason Trench, 2nd Baron Ashtown (1804–1880)
- Frederick Oliver Trench, 3rd Baron Ashtown (1868–1946)
- Robert Power Trench, 4th Baron Ashtown (1897–1966)
- Dudley Oliver Trench, 5th Baron Ashtown (1901–1979)
- Christopher Oliver Trench, 6th Baron Ashtown (1931–1990)
- Nigel Clive Cosby Trench, 7th Baron Ashtown (1916–2010)
- Roderick Nigel Godolphin Trench, 8th Baron Ashtown (born 1944)

The heir apparent is the present holder's only son, Hon. Timothy Roderick Hamilton Trench (born 1968), who is unmarried and without heirs.
The next in line to the barony is the present peer's fifth cousin once removed, Jack Ferdinand Chenevix Trench (born 1978, see succession chart below).

Line of succession (simplified)
- Frederick Trench (1724–1797)
  - Frederick Trench, 1st Baron Ashtown (1755–1840)
  - Francis Trench (1757–1829)
    - Frederick Trench, 2nd Baron Ashtown (1804–1880)
      - Hon. Cosby Godolphin Trench (1844–1925)
        - Clive Newcombe Trench (1884–1964)
          - Nigel Trench, 7th Baron Ashtown (1916–2010)
            - Roderick Trench, 8th Baron Ashtown (born 1944)
              - (1). Hon. Timothy Roderick Hamilton Trench (born 1968)
  - Richard Trench (1774–1860)
    - Most Rev. Richard Chenevix Trench (1807–1886)
      - Charles Chenevix Trench (1839–1933)
        - Sir Richard Henry Chenevix Trench (1876–1954)
          - Charles Pocklington Chenevix Trench (1914–2003)
            - Richard Hugh Roger Chenevix Trench (1949–1997)
              - (2). Jack Ferdinand Chenevix Trench (born 1978)
              - (3). Alexander Ryland Chenevix Trench (born 1986)
    - John Trench (1776–1858)
      - male descendants in succession

The simplified chart above lists those individuals in the line of succession who are nearest in consanguinity to the present peer; there are further heirs in descent from the fifth and sixth brothers of the first baron.
