= Richard Trench, 2nd Earl of Clancarty =

British politician

The Right Honourable The Earl of Clancarty GCB GCH PC
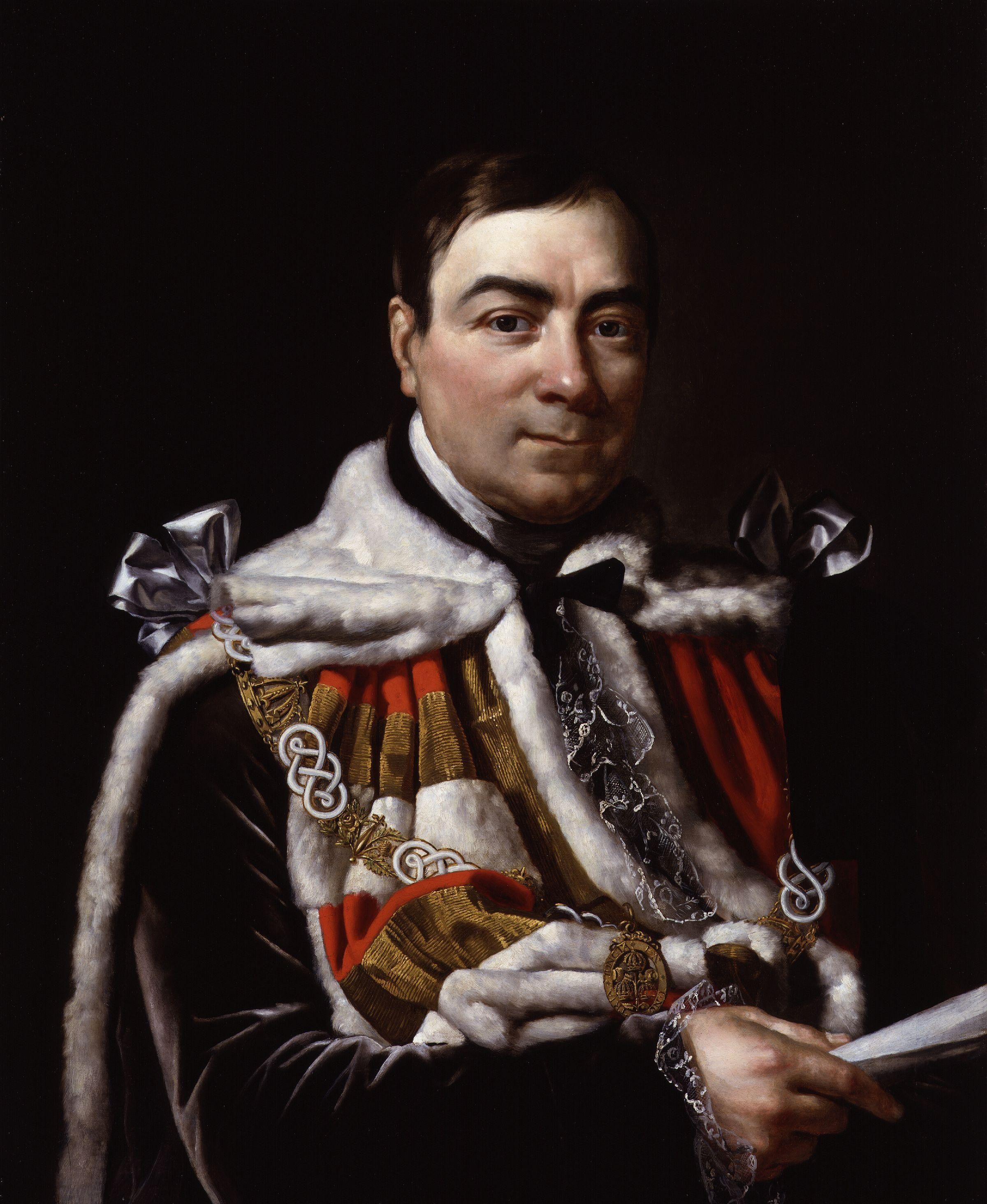
- Portrait by Joseph Paelinck, 1817

President of the Board of Trade
- In office 29 September 1812 – 24 January 1818
- Monarch: George III
- Prime Minister: The Earl of Liverpool
- Preceded by: The Earl Bathurst
- Succeeded by: Hon. F. J. Robinson

Personal details
- Born: 19 May 1767
- Died: 24 November 1837 (aged 70) Kinnegad, County Westmeath
- Party: Tory
- Spouse(s): Henrietta Margaret Staples (c. 1770–1847)
- Children: 8, including Harriet and William
- Education: St John's College, Cambridge

Richard Le Poer Trench, 2nd Earl of Clancarty, 1st Marquess of Heusden GCB GCH PC (19 May 1767 – 24 November 1837), styled The Honourable from 1797 to 1803 and then Viscount Dunlo to 1805, was an Anglo-Irish peer, a nobleman in the Dutch nobility, and a diplomat. He was an Irish, and later British, Member of Parliament and a supporter of Pitt. Additionally he was appointed Postmaster General of Ireland, and later, of the United Kingdom.

== Background and education ==
Clancarty was the son of William Trench, 1st Earl of Clancarty and Anne, daughter of Charles Gardiner and his seat was Garbally Court in Ballinasloe, East County Galway where he was associated with the Great October Fair. His brother was Power Le Poer Trench (1770–1839), archbishop of Tuam. He was educated at Kimbolton School and St John's College, Cambridge.

== Political career ==
Trench represented Newtown Limavady in the Irish House of Commons from 1796 to 1798. He sat further for County Galway from 1798 to a short time before the Act of Union, when he was replaced by "Humanity Dick" Martin.

He was credited with resolving various border disputes in Holland, Germany and Italy at the Congress of Vienna, 1814–1815, and in his role as Ambassador to the Netherlands. For his service as ambassador to The Hague, he was awarded the hereditary title of Marquess of Heusden in the peerage of The Netherlands on 8 July 1815 by William I of the Netherlands, following the defeat of Napoleon in Brabant, in that same province's southern reaches. Trench was elected one of the 28 representative peers of Ireland on 16 December 1808. His seat in the House of Lords became hereditary when he was created Baron Trench (4 August 1815) and Viscount Clancarty (created 8 December 1823), in the Peerage of the United Kingdom, his older peerages being Irish peerages. He was a Commissioner for the Affairs of India and Custos Rotulorum of County Galway.

== Postmaster General ==
Between 1807 and 1809 Trench was one of the joint Postmasters General of Ireland and he was appointed Postmaster General of the United Kingdom being one of the last joint holders of that office from 1814 to 1816.

== Family ==
On 6 February 1796 he married Henrietta Margaret Staples, daughter of John Staples and Harriet Conolly. They had the following children:

1. Lady Lucy Le Poer Trench (d. 1839), married Robert Maxwell
2. Lady Louisa Augusta Anne Le Poer Trench (b. 23 December 1796, d. 7 February 1881), married Reverend William Le Poer Trench
3. Lady Harriet Margaret Le Poer Trench (b. 13 October 1799, d. 1885), married Thomas Kavanagh "the MacMurrough", a descendant of Art mac Art MacMurrough-Kavanagh
4. Lady Emily Florinda Le Poer Trench (b. 7 November 1800), married Giovanni Cossiria
5. Lady Frances Power Le Poer Trench (b. 22 January 1802, d. 28 December 1804)
6. William Thomas Le Poer Trench, 3rd Earl of Clancarty (b 21 September 1803, d. 26 April 1872), married Lady Sarah Juliana Butler, daughter of Somerset Richard Butler, 3rd Earl of Carrick
7. Hon. Richard John Le Poer Trench (b. 1805)
8. Commander Hon. Frederick Robert Le Poer Trench (b. 23 July 1808, d. April 1867), married Catherine Maria Thompson

== Ancestry ==
Ancestors of Richard Trench, 2nd Earl of Clancarty

Frederick Trench of Garbally
Colonel Frederick Trench of Garbally
Elizabeth Warburton
Colonel Richard Trench of Garbally
John Eyre of Eyre Court or Eyrecourt Castle
Elizabeth Eyre
Margery Preston
William Power Keating Trench, 1st Earl of Clancarty
John Power
David Power of Coorheen, Loughrea
Sarah Bowen
Frances Power
William Keating of Lissenhall
Elizabeth Keating
Richard Le Poer Trench, 2nd Earl of Clancarty
Rt Hon Luke Gardiner
Rt Hon Charles Gardiner of Dublin
Hon. Alexander Stewart
Anne Stewart
Mary Tighe
Anne Gardiner
Samuel Norman
Robert Norman
Elizabeth Gage
Florinda Norman
John Bolton
Sarah Bolton

Parliament of Ireland
Preceded by John Staples; Hugh Carncross	Member of Parliament for Newtown Limavady; 1796–1798; With: Hugh Carncross	Succeeded by Viscount Castlereagh; Hugh Carncross
Preceded by William Power Keating Trench; Joseph Henry Blake	Member of Parliament for County Galway; 1797–1800; With: Joseph Henry Blake	Succeeded by Richard Martin; Joseph Henry Blake
Parliament of the United Kingdom
New constituency	Member of Parliament for County Galway; 1801 – 1805; With: Richard Martin	Succeeded by Denis Bowes Daly; Richard Martin
Preceded by Patrick Crauford Bruce; Michael Angelo Taylor	Member of Parliament for Rye; May 1807 – Jul 1807; With: Sir John Nicholl	Succeeded by Sir William Elford, Bt; Stephen Lushington
Political offices
Preceded by The Earl of Clanricarde	Representative peer for Ireland; 1808–1837	Succeeded by The Lord Clonbrock
Government offices
Preceded by The Earl Bathurst	Master of the Mint; 1812–1814	Succeeded by Hon. William Wellesley-Pole
Preceded by The Earl Bathurst	President of the Board of Trade; 1812–1818	Succeeded by Hon. F. J. Robinson
Preceded by The Earl of Sandwich	Postmaster General; 1814–1816	Succeeded by The Marquess of Salisbury
Diplomatic posts
Unknown	British Ambassador to the Netherlands; 1813–1815	Succeeded by Sir Charles Stuart
Preceded by Sir Charles Stuart	British Ambassador to the Netherlands; 1815–1823	Unknown
Dutch nobility
New creation	Marquess of Heusden; 1815–1837	Succeeded by William Thomas Le Poer Trench
Peerage of Ireland
Preceded by William Power Keating Trench	Earl of Clancarty; 2nd creation 1805–1837	Succeeded by William Thomas Le Poer Trench
Peerage of the United Kingdom
New creation	Viscount Clancarty; 1823–1837	Succeeded by William Thomas Le Poer Trench
New creation	Baron Trench; 1815–1837	Succeeded by William Thomas Le Poer Trench
