= Nigel Trench, 7th Baron Ashtown =

Irish peer and diplomat (1916–2010)

Nigel Clive Cosby Trench, 7th Baron Ashtown, KCMG (27 October 1916 – 6 March 2010) was a British peer and diplomat.

Trench was born in St Albans, the son of Clive Newcome Trench and Kathleen Maud Marion McIvor. He was educated at Eton and Corpus Christi College, Cambridge.

After rising to the rank of Major in the King's Royal Rifle Corps during the Second World War, Trench spent some thirty years in the British foreign service, with postings which included Tokyo and Washington, D.C., before serving as British Ambassador to the Republic of Korea (1969–1971) and then to Portugal (1974–1976).

In 1990, after his retirement, he inherited the Irish peerage of Baron Ashtown from his cousin Christopher Trench, 6th Baron Ashtown.

== Honours ==
Trench was appointed a Commander of the Order of St. Michael and St. George in the 1966 Birthday Honours. He was knighted in the same order in the 1976 Birthday Honours.

== Personal life ==
He married Marcelle Catherine Clotterbooke Patijn van Kloetinge in 1939, with whom he had one son, Roderick Trench, 8th Baron Ashtown. He succeeded a cousin as Baron Ashtown in 1990. His wife died in 1994.

Lord Ashtown then married Dorothea Mary Elizabeth Minchin (d. 20 December 2019), former wife of Hans Heinrich XVII, 4th Prince of Pless, in 1997.

He died in London in 2010 and was succeeded as Baron Ashtown by his son, Roderick.

Peerage of Ireland
Preceded by Christopher Trench, 6th Baron Ashtown	Baron Ashtown; 1990–2010	Succeeded by Roderick Trench, 8th Baron Ashtown
