= Frederick Trench, 1st Baron Ashtown =

Irish politician, later peer

Frederick Trench, 1st Baron Ashtown (17 September 1755 – 1 May 1840) was an Irish politician.

He was the son of Frederick Trench and Mary (née Sadleir). The Trench family were of French descent. He was elected to represent Portarlington in the Irish House of Commons in 1798, serving until the abolition of the Parliament of Ireland on 1 January 1801 under the Acts of Union 1800. On 27 December 1800 he was raised to the Peerage of Ireland as Baron Ashtown, of Moate in the County of Galway, with remainder to the heirs male of his father Frederick Trench. This was a so-called "Union peerage", a reward for Trench's support for the Union between Ireland and Great Britain, which he had initially opposed. He was co-opted as an MP for the Portarlington constituency in the post-Union parliament at Westminster, but the creation of the peerage prevented him taking his seat and so he never sat in Westminster.

Lord Ashtown married Elizabeth, daughter of Robert Robinson, in 1785. They had no children. He died in May 1840, aged 84, and was succeeded in the barony according to the special remainder by his nephew Frederick. Lady Ashtown died in 1844.

Parliament of Ireland
Preceded by Sir John Parnell, 2nd Bt; John Stewart	Member of Parliament for Portarlington; 1798–1800; With: Thomas Stannus 1798–1800; William Gregory 1800–1801	Succeeded by Parliament of the United Kingdom
Parliament of the United Kingdom
Preceded by Parliament of Ireland	Member of Parliament for Portarlington; Never took seat January 1801 – March 1801	Succeeded by William Elliot
Peerage of Ireland
New creation	Baron Ashtown; 1800–1840	Succeeded by Frederick Mason Trench
