= Dutch nobility =

Upper class of Dutch society before 1848

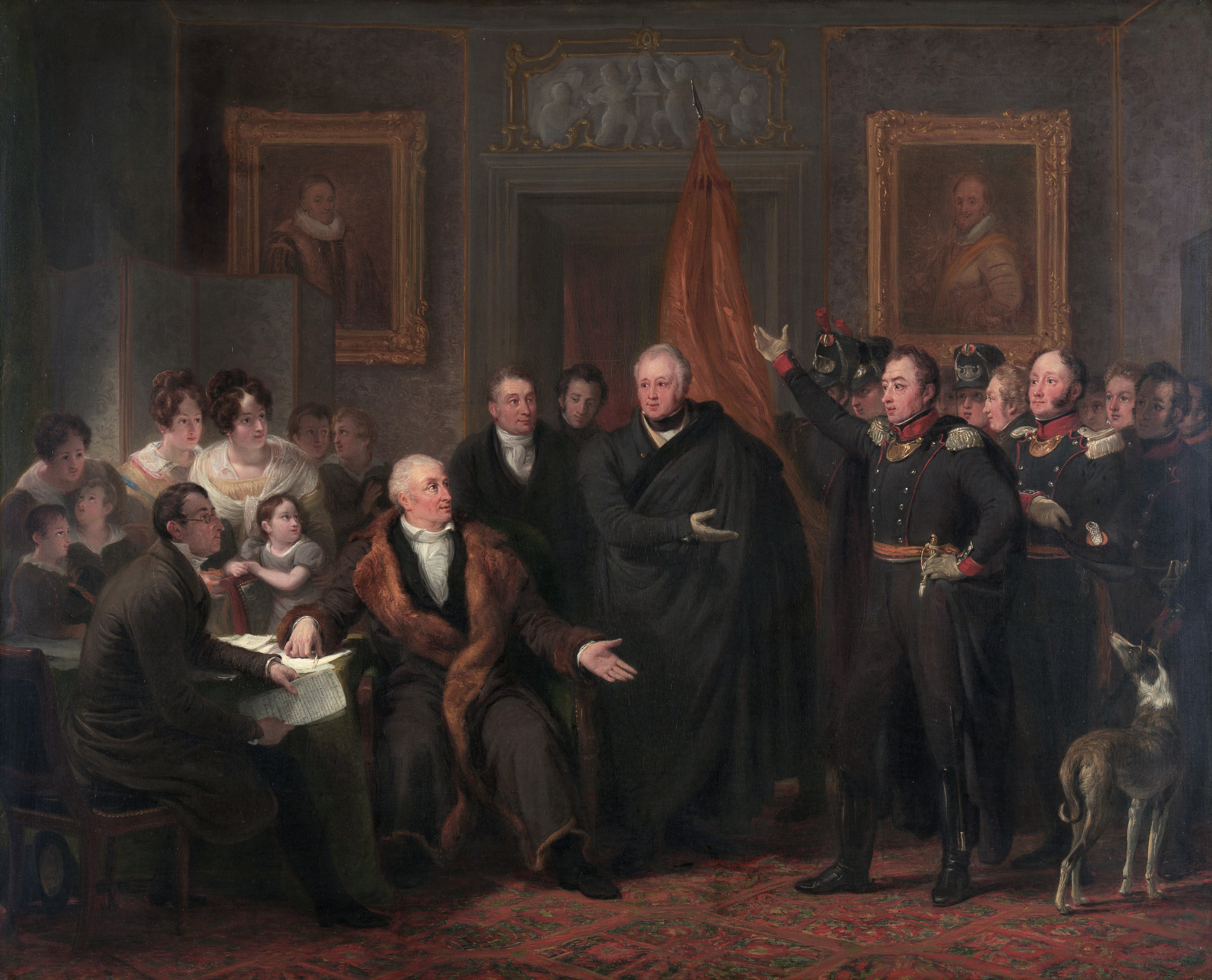
The Triumvirate assuming power in 1813 (1828 painting by Jan Willem Pieneman)

The Dutch nobility is a small elite social class consisting of individuals or families recognised as noble, and with or without a title of nobility in the Kingdom of the Netherlands.

The existence of nobility was established in the Constitution of the Netherlands of 1814. Those who belong to the nobility were entitled to certain privileges, in particular to take a seat in the "Ridderschap", a former executive and legislative assembly at the regional or provincial level, and therewith the power to select members for the States-Provincial.

With the constitutional reform of 1848, the privileges of the Dutch nobles were abolished and they lost their constitutional roles. The only privileges that the former Dutch nobility were allowed to keep were the legal use of titles and the grant of coats of arms by royal decree. The former nobles lost their status of being a noble, and they became civilians with a noble title.

The nobility are currently regulated by the Nobility Act, passed into law on 1 August 1994, and is overseen by the High Council of Nobility, an official state institution of the Kingdom of the Netherlands which also maintains the official nobility register.

== History ==
During the period between 1581 and 1795, when the Netherlands was a republic (Republic of the Seven United Netherlands), the native nobility kept their constitutional significance. In each province, the nobility was organised in knighthoods, which maintained representation in the States-Provincial. In 1795, after the Batavian Revolution, the positions and thus the nobility were abolished.

With the establishment of the Sovereign Principality of the United Netherlands in 1813, the rights of the nobility were restored, and the peerage regained official status. The Constitution established that nobility would be granted by the King, and the ways in which this could happen were clarified by Sovereign Decree no. 60, signed on 13 February 1815. Initially this was by appointment into the re-established knighthoods, but after several years exclusively through acknowledgement, incorporation or elevation. These terms refer to the acknowledgement of indigenous titles of nobility existing before 1795, the incorporation of originally foreign titles of nobility, and elevation where an entirely new title is created. The electoral colleges for the (indirect) elections of the Senate and the House of Representatives of the States General consisted of the knighthoods, amongst others. In 1814, William I established the High Council of Nobility which, as his advisory body, would help him re-establish a strong nobility. From then on, new members of the knighthoods would also be recruited from regent families. The Council started maintaining a register of the nobility, the filiatieregister.

In the constitutional amendment of 1848, the feudal society was abolished, and the constitutional role of the nobility again came to an end. The only legal privilege the nobility retained was the right to hold a predicate or a title. In 1994, the constitutional article was replaced by a separate Nobility Act which codified the existing practice. According to this law, nobility can still be granted in the three aforementioned ways, although the possibilities are significantly reduced. Elevation, which had not taken place since 1939 and was practically abolished by the council of ministers in 1953, has been reduced to the Royal House. Government policy has since focused on rewarding personal merit through royal decorations. The last elevation into the Dutch nobility concerns Princess Máxima, in a Royal Decree of 25 January 2002 (Government Gazette 41), due to the fact of her marriage to the Prince of Orange. In 2016, a survey was conducted among nobles in which at least a quarter stated that they support the resumption of (non-royal) ennoblements, while approximately a third opposed them and the rest had no or a weak opinion. Members of the Nederlandse Adelsvereniging, the organisation which represents the Dutch nobility in CILANE, are more likely to support ennoblement, and are more likely to uphold traditional noble values and marry endogamously. In 2020, nobility expert and director of the foundation Stichting Adel in Nederland John Töpfer also spoke out in favor of a new ennoblements in a radio interview. The continuing practice of hereditary ennoblements in Belgium is often cited by proponents of new nobility in the Netherlands.

== Titles and families ==
Someone belongs to the Dutch nobility when either they have been granted nobility by Royal Decree, or when their father belonged to the nobility. Nobility is inherited exclusively through male lineage, which means that while daughters belong to the nobility as well, they are unable to pass it to their children. Someone can be granted nobility through acknowledgement of indigenous titles of nobility existing before 1795, through incorporation of foreign titles of nobility, or through elevation, in which a new title of nobility is created. There are seven titles of nobility. In order of precedence, these are Prince, Duke, Marquis, Count, Viscount, Baron and Knight. People in the nobility who have not been granted a title carry the predicate Jonkheer or Jonkvrouw.

== Relationship with the Nederland's Patriciaat ==
The Nederland's Patriciaat is a registry of non-noble armigerous families which have held influential roles in Dutch society for at least 150 years or six generations. Many families date from the republican era and are descendants of magistrates and merchants, but as membership in the Patriciate is, unlike nobility, not a legal distinction, and cannot be "closed" by law, new families are admitted every year.

Thus, incorporation into Nederland's Patriciaat can be considered a substitution for ennoblement, a distinction families are accorded if they maintain a high level of merit and success for several generations. The Patriciate, or at least its older families, are considered equal to the nobility, and the oldest families are even given the same status as Barons and Counts. Many Patrician families are non-noble branches of noble families, or descend from persons who were offered ennoblement but declined it.

Just like nobility, membership in the Patriciate is hereditary in the legitimate male line. Intermarriage between nobles and members of Nederland's Patriciaat is common, and the first non-noble to marry into the Dutch royal family, Mr. Pieter van Vollenhoven, is indeed a Dutch Patrician.

Thus, it can be said that the Nobility and the Patriciate are two groups from which the aristocracy of the Netherlands is formed, and the relationship between them is somewhat reminiscent of that between the peerage and the gentry in Great Britain.
