= Baron Dunsandle and Clanconal =

Title in the Peerage of Ireland

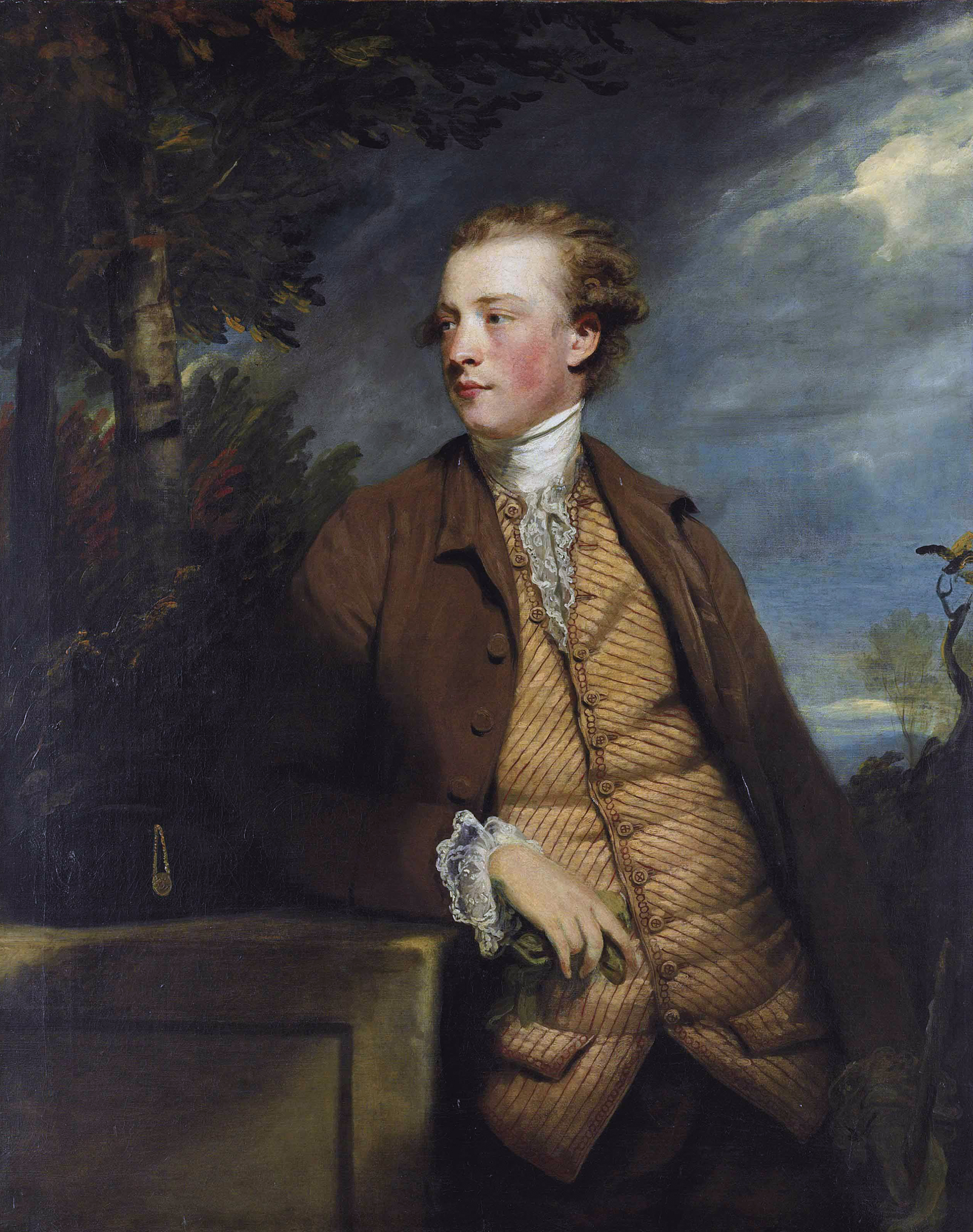
Denis Daly, father of the first Baron Dunsandle and Clanconal.

Baron Dunsandle and Clanconal, of Dunsandle in the County of Galway, was a title in the Peerage of Ireland. It was created on 6 June 1845 for James Daly, who had earlier represented Galway Borough and County Galway in the House of Commons.

He was succeeded by his eldest son, the second Baron. He sat in the House of Lords as an Irish representative peer. He had no legitimate male issue and was succeeded by his younger brother, the third Baron. He died unmarried and was succeeded by his nephew, the fourth Baron. He was the son of the Hon. Robert Daly, youngest son of the first Baron. Lord Dunsandle and Clanconal was Assistant Private Secretary to Prime Minister Benjamin Disraeli between 1874 and 1880. He never married and the title became extinct on his death on 25 November 1911.

The first Baron was the son of Denis Daly, who was the grandson of James Daly and the great-great-grandson of Denis Daly. The soldier and polo player Denis St George Daly was an illegitimate son of the second Baron. William Daly, another illegitimate son of the second Baron, was High Sheriff of County Galway in 1901. The Right Reverend Robert Daly, brother of the first Baron, was Bishop of Cashel and Waterford. St George Daly, uncle of the first Baron, was a Judge of the Court of King's Bench (Ireland).

== Barons Dunsandle and Clanconal (1845) ==
- James Daly, 1st Baron Dunsandle and Clanconal (1782–1847)
- Denis St George Daly, 2nd Baron Dunsandle and Clanconal (1810–1893)
- Skeffington James Daly, 3rd Baron Dunsandle and Clanconal (1811–1894)
- James Frederick Daly, 4th Baron Dunsandle and Clanconal (1849–1911)

Coat of arms of Baron Dunsandle and Clanconal
Crest In front of an oak tree Proper a greyhound courant Sable. Escutcheon Per fess Argent and Or a lion rampant per fess Sable and Gules in chief two dexter hands couped Gules. Supporters Dexter a lion as in the arms, sinister a greyhound Proper. Motto Deo Fidelis Et Regi (Faithful To God And The King)
