= Denis Daly =

Denis Daly may refer to:

- Denis Daly (Galway politician) (1748–1791), Irish landowner and politician, MP for County Galway, 1783–1792
- Denis Daly (Kerry politician) (died 1965), member of the Dáil, 1933–1937
- Denis Daly (judge) (c. 1638–1721), Irish judge and Privy Councillor
- Denis Bowes Daly (c. 1745–1821), Irish politician
- Denis St. George Daly (1862–1942), Irish polo player
- Denis Daly (hurler) (1876–1947), Irish hurler

== See also ==
- Dennis Daly (1911–1968), South African cricketer
- Denis Daily (born 1996), Canadian YouTuber
