= Dermot Ó Daly =

Irish landowner (fl. 1574–1614)

Dermot O Daly, was a Gaelic-Irish landlord, ancestor of Baron Dunsandle and Clanconal, fl. 1574 – 10 November 1614.

== Background ==
Dermot was the son of Teige, son of John O Daly, who built Killimor keep during the reign of Henry VIII. Nothing more is known for certain of his ancestry. Pedigrees considered dubious by recent historians claim his descent from the bardic Ó Dálaigh.

James Noel Dillion speculates that "Dermot O’Daly was a chancer, whose rapid advancement was due to the success of the Presidency of Connaught and his ability to turn opportunity to advantage. … he was an ardent crown supporter and the supposed stability which would accrue as a repercussion of adopting English customs and laws."

== Active life ==
He was first recorded in the fiant of 1570, along with others of the name, located at Laragh in the parish of Killimordaly. He and his family were consistently listed as the Earl of Clanricarde's men. For services to the government, on 21 June 1578 Elizabeth I granted him "the entire Manor or Lordship of Lerra with all the towns and castles belonging". O Daly maintained his own militia, perhaps provided coyne and livery for president of Connacht. The east road of Athenry known as the Laragh Road, points to the strategic significance of O Daly's castle. He is listed in 1581 among the gentlemen of Connacht owning "arrearages of chief rent" to the sum of 96 pounds, 9 shillings and 1 penny.

His lands were devastated by Hugh Roe Ó Donnell in January 1597, hundreds of cattle stolen, his tenants and neighbours killed, or afterwards died of starvation. He fought under Clanricarde on the side of the English at the Battle of Kinsale in 1601.

== After 1603 ==
In the subsequent peace after the end of the war, O Daly adapted to English modes of agriculture, and attracted families with trades/skills to settle in his area. He promoted the techniques of drainage, quarrying, land cleared of scrub, and hay harvesting to reduce pastoralism in winter.

== Children ==
- Teige of Killimor married Sisily Kelly of Gallagh and had children. They completed Killimor Castle in 1624, recorded on O Daly Marriage Stone, preserved at Killimor Church. Teige died in 1642.
- Dermot of Clonbrusk Castle, Athenry, married and left children.
- Donagh of Laragh, ancestor of the Raford and Dunsandle families
- Fergananim of Oughtercluny, Clonfert, married and had children.
- Godfrey of Newcastle, Athenry, ancestor of the Dalysgrove and Castle Daly families.

== Descendants ==
- Denis Daly (M.P.), 1748-1791
- St George Daly (1758-1829)
- Robert Daly, D.D., 1783–1872
- James Daly, 1st Baron Dunsandle and Clanconal (1782-1847)
- Dominick Daly, 1798–1868

-General Sir Henry Dermot Daly (1823–1895
