= Ardfry House =

Ruined house in County Galway, Ireland

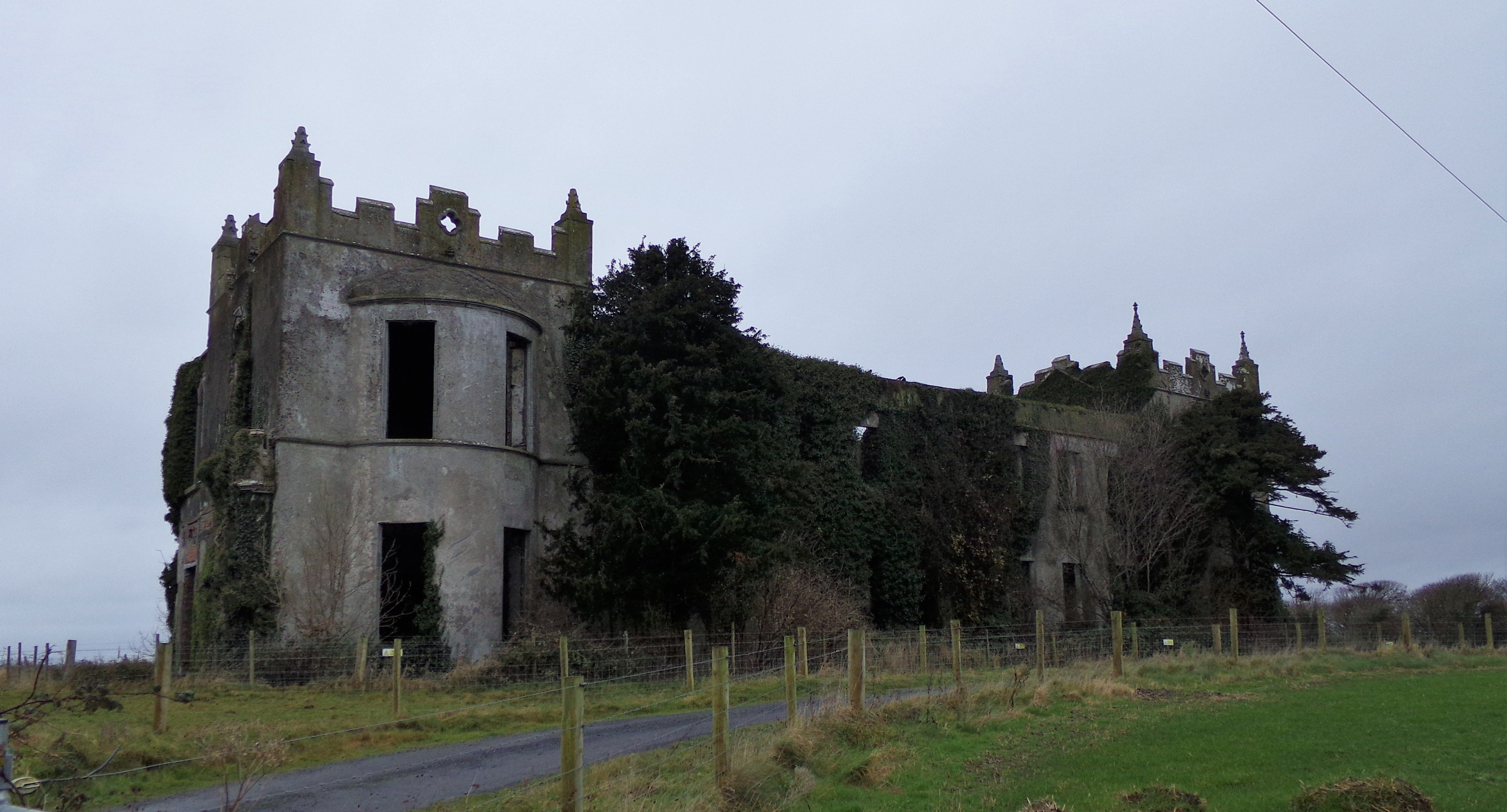
- Ardfry House in 2016

- Location within Ireland

General information
- Type: House
- Architectural style: Georgian; Gothic
- Classification: Derelict
- Location: Rinville, Oranmore, County Galway, Ireland
- Coordinates: 53°14′14″N 8°58′36″W
- Estimated completion: 1770
- Renovated: 1826

Technical details
- Material: Limestone
- Floor count: 2 over basement

Design and construction
- Known for: Seat of Baron Wallscourt; Filming location for The Mackintosh Man

Ardfry House is a ruined country house located on a peninsula in Galway Bay near Oranmore in County Galway, Ireland. It was built in the 18th century on the site of a 9th century moated castle. It is a two-storey, double-pile house. The surrounding estate includes outbuildings and a walled orchard. Ardfry was originally home to politician Joseph Blake and became the seat of the Baron Wallscourt. By the 1820s, the house had fallen into a state of dilapidation. The 3rd Baron Wallscourt used his wife's dowry to pay for restoration work, which added a number of Gothic Revival features to the house such as pinnacles and quatrefoils. An oyster farm was created by Lord Wallscourt in the Bay in 1902.

Ardfry suffered a small fire in the hall in 1910, which damaged the mantlepiece and flooring. In the early 1920s, the second wife of the 4th Baron Wallscourt sold the lead from the roof in order to pay gambling debts, while a large number of items were stolen from the house. Ardfry eventually fell into disrepair and was abandoned. In 1950, the three granddaughters of the 4th Baron reclaimed the house and estate, and lived in one of the outbuildings. The house was used as a set in the 1973 British film The Mackintosh Man. New windows and a roof were added, before it was deliberately set alight. The fire burned the remaining internal features and the house was left in ruins.

Ardfry was sold in 2000 and the owner planned to turn it into a five-star hotel, however, the house was placed back on the market in 2001 and again in 2004, with planning permission given for restoration of the house and conversion of the remaining buildings into houses and apartments. In 2013, Galway County Council issued the owners with an enforcement notice after they carried out "unauthorised" demolition of part of the house. Ardfry and its surrounding land was put up for auction again in April 2015. In 2019, An Taisce (The National Trust for Ireland) stated that Ardfry was at high risk of collapse due to structural problems and continued deterioration.

== History ==
=== 18th–20th century ===
Ardfry, meaning "The Height of the Heather", was built in 1770 by politician Joseph Blake, later Baron Wallscourt, on the site of a medieval castle owned by the Blake family, one of the tribes of Galway. Some parts of the 9th century moated castle remain on the land. Ardfry is a limestone, two-storey over basement double-pile house, with nine bays in the front, six bays in the rear, and two-bay towers. The house is approximately 5,565sq ft per floor and 16,700sq ft overall. Ardfry is set within 33 acres of land, which also includes a number of outbuildings, cottages, a stone forge, and a three acre limestone walled orchard. By the 1820s, the house had fallen into a state of dilapidation and the 3rd Lord Wallscourt used his second wife, Bessie Lock's £8,000 dowry to carry out restoration work, which added a number of Gothic Revival features, including crenellated parapets, pinnacles and quatrefoils on the end of the pavilions. A gothic-style conservatory with stone piers was also added. The restoration was completed in 1826.

An "experimental" oyster farm was created by Lord Wallscourt in the bay in 1902. The following year, the Department of Agriculture carried out experiments in the hatching and breeding of oysters after leasing the ponds established by Lord Wallscourt. A Welsh fishing syndicate entered into negotiations to purchase the oyster beds in October 1926, following years of neglect. A report in The Galway Observer believed the deal would bring a lot of employment to the local area.

On 25 April 1910, in the early morning, a fire broke out in the hall. A report in the Staffordshire Sentinel detailed how a bundle of sticks in one of the fireplaces caught alight and the flames reached woodwork over the mantlepiece. Lord Wallscourt heard a noise around 4:30am, before finding the hall filled with smoke. A servant discovered the fire, and police from Oranmore and soldiers from Renmore Barracks were summoned to help, while servants tore away the ceiling to stop the spread of the fire to the upper floor. The report stated that several valuable pictures and ornaments were destroyed by the fire, while a report in the Dublin Daily Express stated that the mantelpiece, flooring, carpet and a valuable clock were considerably damaged.

In the early 1920s, Mary Ethel Palliser, the second wife of Erroll Augustus Blake, 4th Baron Wallscourt, had to sell the lead from the roof in order to pay her gambling debts. In mid-1922, a large number of items, including books and furniture, were stolen from the house. The Garda Síochána searched houses in nearby Oranmore and discovered several stolen items at the home of a man named Carrick, who was taken into custody. Carrick's own house was set alight in a suspected malicious act while he was attending a bail hearing in Galway. A father and son were also arrested after Guards found "a considerable amount" of property from Ardfry in their outhouse. A revolver used in the robbery was also found. Further items from Ardfry were found in the village dumped in various places, including stonewalls. In 1924, Carrick and his mother were returned for trial at Galway District Court for being in possession of stolen items, including a sword, a writing desk and books from the house. Another man was also charged with larceny of curtain poles and panels from the house, as well as taking illegal possession of the steward's house on the estate.

The Wallscourt title became extinct in 1922, following the death of Charles William Joseph Henry Blake, 5th Baron Wallscourt on 27 May 1920. Ardfry House eventually fell into disrepair, and with the majority of the contents having been stolen, it was abandoned. In 1950, the three granddaughters of the 4th Baron Wallscourt reclaimed the house and estate, and lived together in one of the outbuildings. The house was used as a set in the 1973 British spy thriller film The Mackintosh Man, which stars Paul Newman. It was re-roofed and new windows were installed, before it was set alight during filming. Many of the remaining internal features were burned by the fire.

=== 21st century ===
Ardfry House was sold in 2000 and the new owner intended to turn it into a five-star hotel, but the project was never started and the house was placed back on the market in August 2001 for £1.6 million. The property was placed back on the market in 2004, this time with planning permission given for restoration of the house and conversion of the remaining buildings into 24 houses and apartments.

In April 2013, the owners of the house were issued with an enforcement notice by Galway County Council, following "unauthorised" demolition of part of the house. Archaeologist Michael Gibbons witnessed stone being removed from the building and reported it to the Office of Public Works, the local authority, Birdwatch Ireland, and the Royal Irish Academy. The owners were ordered to cease the work and consult with the council's heritage and conservation office. The council also warned that they would be guilty of an offence if they did not adhere to any steps outlined by it.

Ardfry and its surrounding land was put up for auction again in April 2015, with a reserve price of €1.8 to €2 million.

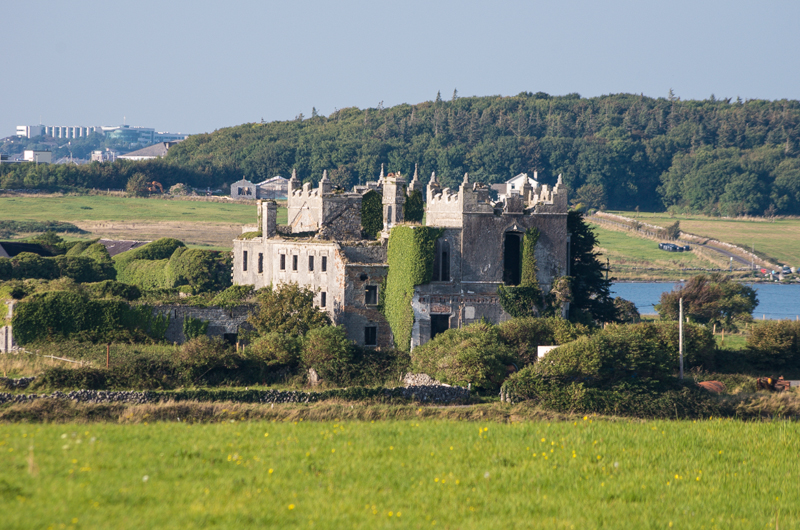
The rear view of Ardfry House

The house has become a nesting site for owls, and the peninsula on which it sits includes various archaeological sites, including one of "the largest kitchen middens in Galway Bay." In 2019, An Taisce (The National Trust for Ireland) recommended conservation work for Ardfry House, which they felt was at high risk of collapse due to structural problems and continued deterioration.

== Legend and folklore ==
John O'Keeffe of the Sunday Independent reported that the 3rd Lord Wallscourt often walked around the house naked, and was "a man of exceptional strength and prone to impressive displays of violence" while doing so. Keeffe said that Lord Wallscourt's wife made him wear a cowbell to warn servants of his impending approach.

In September 1926, an American man, originally from Oranmore, recalled to reporters of The Galway Observer that he had seen the ghost of a young woman while he rested on the shore near Ardfry. He told them that a woman "with a wealth of tresses" walked out of the water to the opposite side of the little buoy. He said at one point she appeared to be swimming, before she disappeared "as if the ground had swallowed her" and a blood curdling cry was heard. The man told some neighbours nearby and one recalled that after a dance at the house, one of the guests disappeared and was believed to have drowned at sea. Her body was never found.

The Galway City Museum has in its collection a cloth doll that was donated from Ardfry House, along with various other items. Riona Egan from the museum stated that while not much is known about the doll, it is "one of our spookiest objects in store".
