= Sir Skeffington Smyth, 1st Baronet =

Sir Skeffington Edward Smyth, 1st Baronet (May 1745 – 9 September 1797) was an Anglo-Irish politician and baronet.

== Biography ==
Smyth was born in Tinny Park, Wicklow, County Wicklow, the son of James Smyth, a Member of Parliament of Ireland for the borough of Antrim, and Mary Agar. Smyth was the grandson of Anglican Bishop of Down, Rev. Dr. Edward Smyth and Mary Skeffington. He was the brother of Elizabeth, Comtesse de Jarnac (wife of Charles Rohan-Chabot, Comte de Jarncac).

On 5 August 1776, Smyth was created a baronet, of Tinny Park in the Baronetage of Ireland. In 1779 he was elected to the Irish House of Commons as the MP for Mullingar, serving until 1783. He then represented Belturbet from 1783 until 1790, and Galway Town from 1790 until his death in 1797. In 1785 he was made a member of the Privy Council of Ireland.

Skeffington Smyth married Margaret Daly and they had a daughter Maria Elizabeth Smyth who married James Daly, who was a member for Galway Borough. Another daughter, Rosetta, married Michael Prendergast, another member of parliament for Galway.

Smyth died aged 52 in County Meath on 9 September 1797. As he had no son, his baronetcy became extinct on his death.

Parliament of Ireland
Preceded by Richard Underwood; John Scott	Member of Parliament for Mullingar; 1779–1783; With: John Scott	Succeeded by Francis Hardy; John Doyle
Preceded by Charles Francis Sheridan; Robert Birch	Member of Parliament for Belturbet; 1783–1790; With: David La Touche	Succeeded by John McClintock; Maurice Coppinger
Preceded by Anthony Daly; Denis Bowes Daly	Member of Parliament for Galway Town; 1790–1797; With: Denis Daly (1790–1791); Peter Daly (1792–1797)	Succeeded by St George Daly; George Ponsonby
Baronetage of Ireland
New creation	Baronet (of Tinny Park); 1776–1797	Extinct
