= James Daly (died 1769) =

Irish Member of Parliament (c.1716–1769)

James Daly (c. 1716 – 1769) was an Irish Member of Parliament.

== Early life ==
He was son of Denis Daly of Carrownakelly, County Galway, and grandson of Denis Daly, a judge of the Irish Court of Common Pleas.

== Career ==
In 1741 he was elected to the Irish House of Commons for Athenry, and then in 1768 for the borough of Galway Town.

== Personal life ==
He was married firstly to Hon. Bridget Bermingham, a daughter of Francis Bermingham, 14th Baron Athenry and Lady Mary Nugent. After her death, he married Catherine Gore, daughter of Sir Ralph Gore, 4th Baronet and, his second wife, Elizabeth Ashe. Among their children were:

- Denis Daly (1748–1791), a politician who married Lady Henrietta Maxwell, the only daughter of Robert Maxwell, 1st Earl of Farnham and Henrietta Cantillon (widow of the 3rd Earl of Stafford), in 1780.
- St George Daly (1758–1829), a judge who married his cousin Louisa Gore, daughter of Richard Gore of Sandymount, in 1803.

Daly died in 1769.

=== Descendants ===
Through his son Denis, he was a grandfather of James Daly, 1st Baron Dunsandle and Clanconal and Rt. Rev. Robert Daly, a leading Irish evangelical who became Bishop of Cashel and Waterford, and was noted for his hostility to Roman Catholics.
