= Richard III de Bermingham =

Richard III de Bermingham, Anglo-Irish lord, born c. 1570, died 1645.

Richard prospered during the economic recovery of Ireland in the early decades of the 17th century. However, he was one of dozens of Connacht landowners threatened with confiscation by Thomas Wentworth, 1st Earl of Strafford during the 1630s. Though never among the most prominent persons of the era, he was associated with the likes of Patrick D'Arcy, Sir Diarmaid Ó Seachnasaigh and Richard Martyn.

He became a member of the Confederate Ireland after the Irish Rebellion of 1641.

Peerage of Ireland
Preceded by Richard II de Bermingham	Baron Athenry; 1612–1645	Succeeded by Edmond II de Bermingham
