= William Trench, 1st Earl of Clancarty =

Irish aristocrat and politician (1741–1805)

The Right Honourable The Earl of Clancarty

Member of Parliament for County Galway
- In office 1768–1797 Serving with Denis Daly, Joseph Henry Blake
- Preceded by: Lord Dunkellin; Denis Daly
- Succeeded by: Hon. Richard Trench; Joseph Henry Blake

Personal details
- Born: William Power Keating Trench; 23 June 1741
- Died: 27 April 1805 (aged 63) Ballinasloe, Ireland
- Party: Whig
- Spouse: Anne Gardiner (m. 1762; died 1805)
- Children: 19
- Parent(s): Richard Trench; Frances Power

William Power Keating Trench, 1st Earl of Clancarty (23 June 1741 – 27 April 1805) was an Irish aristocrat and politician and later United Kingdom statesman at the time of the Act of Union. His family, through his son Richard, became prominent and hereditary members of the Netherlands' nobility.

== Early life ==
Trench was born on 23 June 1741. He was one of six sons and five daughters born to Frances (née Power) Trench and Richard Trench. Among his siblings were Gen. Eyre Power Trench (who married Charlotte, widow of Sir John Burgoyne, 7th Baronet and daughter of James Johnston), Nicholas Power Trench (who married Jane Butler, daughter of Sir Richard Butler, 5th Baronet), and Anne Power Trench (wife of Charles Cobbe, MP, son of Thomas Cobbe and grandson of Charles Cobbe, Archbishop of Dublin).

His paternal grandparents were Elizabeth (née Eyre) Trench and Frederick Trench, who represented Banagher and County Galway in the Irish House of Commons. His maternal grandparents were David Power and Elizabeth (née Keating) Power.

== Career ==
William was a Member of Parliament in the Irish House of Commons, and supported the Whigs. He represented County Galway from 1768 until 1797 and served as High Sheriff of County Kilkenny in 1777.

He was advanced to the Irish House of Lords as Baron Kilconnel (created 25 November 1797), and to the position of Viscount Dunlo (created 3 January 1801) as a reward for his continuing support of the Whig Party. On 12 February 1803 he became Earl of Clancarty. His choice of the title is derived from his descent from Elena MacCarty, wife of John Power, daughter of Cormac Oge MacCarty, Viscount Muskerry, and sister of Donough MacCarty, 1st Earl of Clancarty. He therefore became the first Earl of Clancarty in its second creation.

== Personal life ==
On 30 October 1762, Trench married Anne Gardiner, daughter of Florinda (née Norman) Gardiner and Charles Gardiner of Dublin, MP for Taghmon. Anne's brother was Luke Gardiner, 1st Viscount Mountjoy. The Trench family seat was at Garbally in Ballinasloe. William and Anne had nineteen children:

1. Frances Trench (1765–1768), who died young.
2. Anne Trench (1766–1833), who married William Gregory of Coole., so she was the grandmother of William Henry Gregory who married Lady Gregory
3. Lady Florinda Trench (1766–1851), who married William Handcock, 1st Viscount Castlemaine.
4. Francis Trench (1767–1805), who died unmarried.
5. Charles Trench (1767–1770), who died young.
6. Richard Le Poer Trench, 2nd Earl of Clancarty (1767–1837), who married Henrietta Margaret Staples.
7. Power Le Poer Trench (1770–1839), the Archbishop of Tuam who married Anne Taylor.
8. William Le Poer Trench (1771–1846), a Rear Admiral who married Sarah Cuppage and, after her death, Margaret Downing.
9. Charles Le Poer Trench (1772–1839), the Archdeacon of Ardagh who married Frances Elwood.
10. Thomas Le Poer Trench (1774–1795), who died unmarried.
11. Luke Henry Le Poer Trench (1775–1798), who died unmarried.
12. Louisa Trench (1776–1785), who died young.
13. Frederick Trench (1778–1800), who died unmarried.
14. Robert Le Poer Trench (1782–1823), a Colonel who married Letitia Susanna Dillon, a daughter of Robert Dillon, 1st Baron Clonbrock.
15. Lady Elizabeth Trench (1784–1877), who married John McClintock of Drumcar.
16. Lady Harriet Trench (1785–1855), who married Sir Daniel Toler Osborne, 12th Baronet.
17. Lady Frances Mary Trench (1787–1843), who married Henry Stanley Monck, 1st Earl of Rathdowne.
18. Lady Louisa Trench (1789–1852), who died unmarried.
19. Lady Emily Trench (1790–1816), who married Robert La Touche of Harristown.

Lord Clancarty died on 27 April 1805 at Ballinasloe, Ireland. He was succeeded in his titles by his son, Richard.

== Ancestry ==
Ancestors of William Trench, 1st Earl of Clancarty

Frederick Trench of Garbally
Frederick Trench of Garbally
Anna Trench
Colonel Frederick Trench of Garbally
Richard Warburton of Garryhinch
Elizabeth Warburton
Judith Sandes (Sandys?)
Colonel Richard Trench of Garbally
Colonel John Eyre of Eyrecourt Castle
John Eyre of Eyre Court or Eyrecourt Castle
Mary Bygoe
Elizabeth Eyre
Sir George Preston of Craigmillar (Castle?)
Margery Preston
William Power Keating Trench
David Power
John Power
Bridgett Thornton
David Power of Coorheen, Loughrea
John Bowen
Sarah Bowen
Frances Power
William Keating of Lissenhall
Elizabeth Keating

Parliament of Ireland
Preceded by Lord Dunkellin; Denis Daly	Member of Parliament for County Galway; 1768–1797; With: Denis Daly; Joseph Henry Blake	Succeeded by Hon. Richard Trench; Joseph Henry Blake
Peerage of Ireland
New creation	Earl of Clancarty; 2nd creation 1803–1805	Succeeded by Richard Trench
New creation	Viscount Dunlo; 1801–1805	Succeeded by Richard Trench
New creation	Baron Kilconnel; 1797–1805	Succeeded by Richard Trench
