= Denis Daly (died 1791) =

Irish politician (1748–1791)

The Right Honourable Denis Daly PC (Ire)
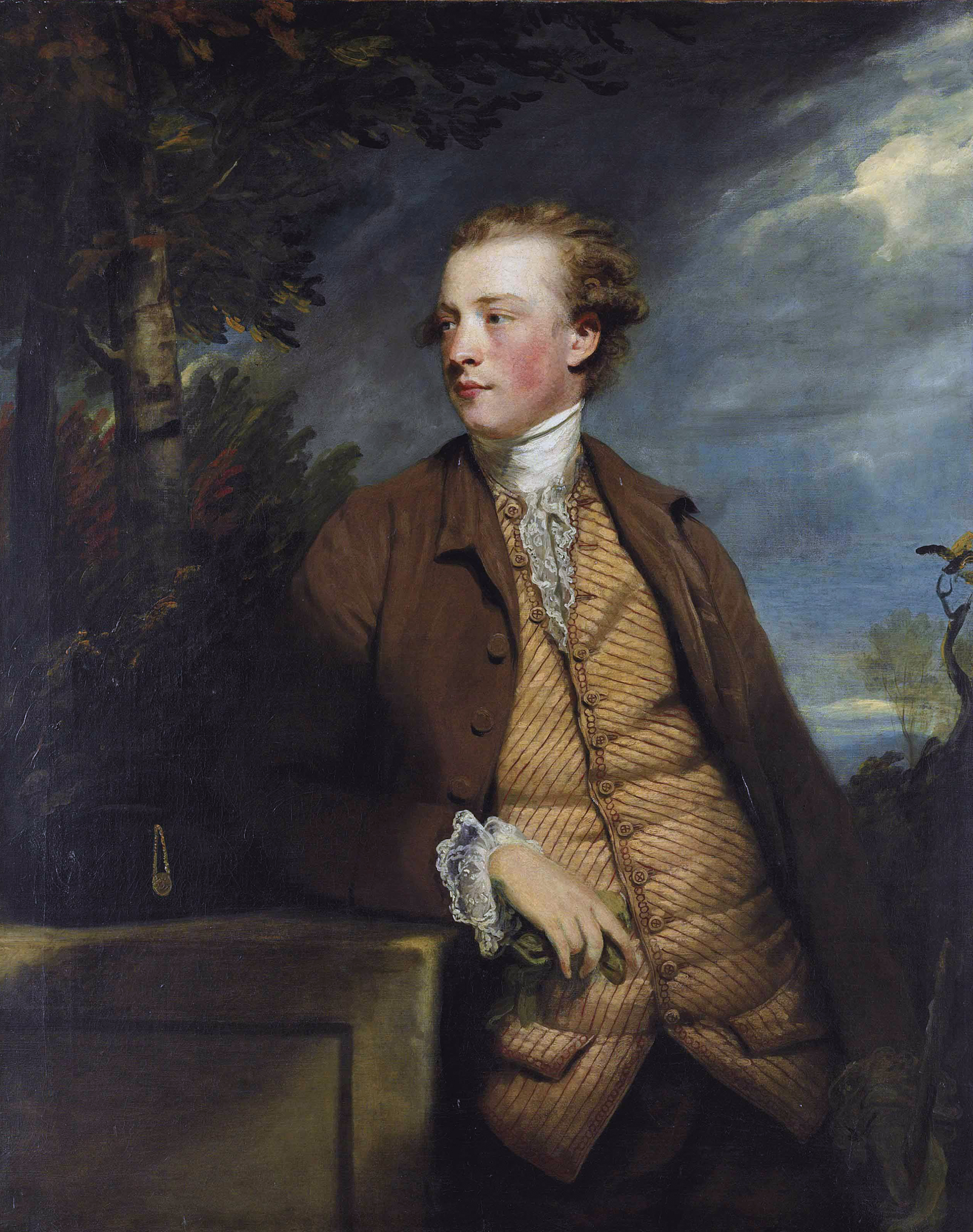
- Portrait of Daly, by Joshua Reynolds, c. 1775

Member of Parliament for Galway Town
- In office 1790–1791 Serving with Sir Skeffington Smyth, 1st Bt
- Preceded by: Anthony Daly; Denis Bowes Daly
- Succeeded by: Peter Daly; Sir Skeffington Smyth, 1st Bt

Member of Parliament for County Galway
- In office 1768–1790 Serving with Lord Dunkellin, William Trench
- Preceded by: Charles Daly; Richard Trench
- Succeeded by: William Trench; Joseph Blake

Member of Parliament for Galway Town
- In office 1783–1783 Serving with Denis Bowes Daly
- Preceded by: Denis Bowes Daly; Anthony Daly
- Succeeded by: Denis Bowes Daly; Anthony Daly
- In office 1767–1768 Serving with John Eyre
- Preceded by: John Eyre; Hon. Richard FitzPatrick
- Succeeded by: James Daly; Robert French

Personal details
- Born: 1748
- Died: 10 October 1791 (aged 42–43)
- Spouse: Lady Henrietta Maxwell (m. 1780; died 1791)
- Relations: John Robert Godley (grandson)
- Children: 8, including James and Robert
- Parent(s): James Daly; Catherine Gore
- Education: Christ Church, Oxford

Denis Daly (1748 – 10 October 1791) of Carrownakelly and Dunsandle Castle, Loughrea, County Galway, was an Irish landowner and politician.

== Biography ==
His father was James Daly of Carrownakelly and Dunsandle Castle in County Galway, and his mother was Catherine Gore, daughter of Sir Ralph Gore, 4th Baronet and his second wife Elizabeth Ashe. He was the eldest of five sons. His siblings included St George Daly, judge of the Court of King's Bench (Ireland). He was the great-grandson of Denis Daly, judge of the Court of Common Pleas (Ireland). Though traditionally Roman Catholics, and of Gaelic origin, the Dalys had been able to hold on to their lands by converting to the Protestant faith and forsaking their allegiance to the Stuart dynasty.

He was educated at Christ Church, Oxford, but there is no record of his taking a degree there.

== Career ==
Daly owned estates in County Mayo, County Galway, County Clare, and County Limerick. He had to sell off half of these estates to pay his debts, but on his marriage to Lady Henrietta Maxwell, his fortunes once again increased. His family residence was Carrownakelly Castle, in the parish of Kiltullagh, where the Dalys had lived for several generations, but he moved some four miles south towards Loughrea where he built Dunsandle House, sometime in the mid-18th century. In 1769 and 1772 he served as Mayor of Galway.

=== Political career ===
Daly was a friend of Henry Grattan, who had great respect for his political skills, and like him sat in the Irish House of Commons. Between 1767 and 1768, he was Member of Parliament for Galway Town. Subsequently, he represented County Galway until 1790, and then Galway Town again until 1792. In 1783, he was also elected for the latter constituency, but chose not to sit. He never held high ministerial office but was appointed Muster Master-General. He was a fine orator but did not often speak in Parliament; when he did it was usually from a carefully prepared script.

=== Character ===
He had a reputation for laziness, but he was intelligent, good-humoured, and a fine classical scholar. Grattan called him one of the best and brightest characters Ireland had ever produced, and said that his early death was a tragedy for his country. Grattan even suggested that Daly's wisdom and moderation, had he lived, might have prevented the Irish Rebellion of 1798.

== Personal life ==
In 1780, Daly married Lady Henrietta Maxwell (d. 1852), the only daughter of Robert Maxwell, 1st Earl of Farnham and Henrietta Cantillon, widow of the 3rd Earl of Stafford. Together, they were the parents of two sons and six daughters, including:

- James Daly, 1st Baron Dunsandle and Clanconal (1782–1847), who represented County Galway in Parliament; he married Maria Elizabeth Smyth, daughter of Rt. Hon. Sir Skeffington Smyth, 1st Baronet and Margaret Daly (sister of Denis Bowes Daly), in 1808.
- Rt. Rev. Robert Daly (1783–1872), who was a leading Irish evangelical who became Bishop of Cashel and Waterford, and was noted for his hostility to Roman Catholics.
- Charlotte Elizabeth Daly (c. 1787–1866), who married Very Rev. Horatio Townsend Newman, Dean of Cork, in 1817.
- Henrietta Daly, who died unmarried.
- Katharine Daly, who married John Godley, the High Sheriff of Leitrim who was a son of John Godley, in 1813.
- Elizabeth Daly
- Emily Daly (d. 1876), who married Sir Morgan Crofton, 3rd Baronet, son of Sir Hugh Crofton, 2nd Baronet, in 1812.
- Mary Daly (d. 1885), who married Rev. Arthur Knox, son of Arthur Knox, in 1820.

His widow died at a great age in 1852.

=== Descendants ===
Through his eldest son James, he was grandfather of seven, including Denis Daly, 2nd Baron Dunsandle and Clanconal and Skeffington Daly, 3rd Baron Dunsandle and Clanconal.

Through his daughter Katharine, he was a grandfather of John Robert Godley (who married Charlotte Griffith-Wynne and was the father of Arthur Godley, 1st Baron Kilbracken) and William Godley (who married Laura Bird and was the father of Gen. Sir Alexander Godley).

Parliament of Ireland
Preceded by John Eyre; Hon. Richard FitzPatrick	Member of Parliament for Galway Town; 1767–1768; With: John Eyre	Succeeded by James Daly; Robert French
Preceded by Denis Bowes Daly; Anthony Daly	Member of Parliament for Galway Town; 1783; With: Denis Bowes Daly	Succeeded by Denis Bowes Daly; Anthony Daly
Preceded by Charles Daly; Richard Trench	Member of Parliament for County Galway; 1768 – 1790; With: Henry de Burgh, Lord Dunkellin 1768; William Power Keating Trench 1768–1790	Succeeded by William Power Keating Trench; Joseph Henry Blake
Preceded by Anthony Daly; Denis Bowes Daly	Member of Parliament for Galway Town; 1790–1792; With: Sir Skeffington Smyth, 1st Bt	Succeeded by Peter Daly; Sir Skeffington Smyth, 1st Bt
