= Thomas Barnwall Martin =

Irish landowner and politician

Thomas Barnwall Martin (1784 – April 1847) was an Irish landowner and politician.

Martin was the eldest surviving son of Richard Martin, humanitarian and member of parliament for County Galway, by his first wife Elizabeth Vesey. Following an unhappy conclusion to a love affair with the daughter of a local chandler, Thomas left home to join the army. He served at the Siege of Badajoz (1812), Spain in 1812, where he was wounded severely.

Despite a personal commendation by the Duke of Wellington himself, Martin returned to Ireland where he later married, inherited the family estate centred at Ballynahinch Castle in Connemara, and successfully campaigned for his father's former seat in Parliament in 1832 and served in this position until his death.

Martin died as a result of famine fever, contracted while trying to save his tenants from the effects of the famine. His final words were "My God! What will become of my people?"

He was married to Julia Kirwan, daughter of Patrick Kirwan of Dalgan Park. She had a dowry of £15,000. They had one daughter, Mary Letitia Martin (d. 30 October 1850), an author who married Arthur G. Bell.

== See also ==
- The Tribes of Galway

Parliament of the United Kingdom
| Preceded by Sir John Burke, Bt; James Staunton Lambert | Member of Parliament for County Galway; 1832 – 1847; With: James Daly; John James Bodkin | Succeeded by Thomas Burke; Christopher St. George |
