= Edmond II de Bermingham =

Edmond de Bermingham was an Anglo-Irish lord, alive in 1645.

Edmond succeeded upon his father's death in 1645 but had joined, or was about to join, the Franciscan order, so he resigned the lordship to his younger brother, Francis.

He was a contemporary of another Franciscan, Francis Bermingham. Their relationship is unknown.

Peerage of Ireland
Preceded by Richard II de Bermingham	Baron Athenry; 1645	Succeeded by Francis de Bermingham
