= Galway Town (Parliament of Ireland constituency) =

Pre-1801 Irish constituency

- Former borough constituency for the Irish House of Commons
- County: County Galway
- Borough: Galway

1264–1801
- Seats: 2
- Replaced by: Galway Borough

Galway Town was a constituency representing the town of Galway in the Irish House of Commons until its abolition on 1 January 1801.

== History ==
In the Patriot Parliament of 1689 summoned by James II, Galway Town was represented with two members.

== Members of Parliament, 1264–1801 ==
- 1560 Jonoke Lynch and Peter Lynch
- 1585 Jonoke Lynch and Peter Lynch and Robert French
- 1613–1615 Geoffrey Lynch and Sir Valentine Blake, 1st Baronet
- 1634–1635 Sir Thomas Blake (expelled) and Nicholas Lynch
- 1639–1642 Sir Robuck Lynch, 2nd Baronet and Sir Valentine Blake, 3rd Baronet
- 1661–1666 Edward Eyre and John Eyre

=== 1689–1801 ===
Election	First MP	Second MP
1689	Oliver Martin	John Kirwan
1692	Sir Henry Bellasis	Nehemiah Donnellan
1695	Richard St George	Robert Ormsby
1703	Edward Eyre	John Staunton (Note: Declared not duly elected in 1715)
1713	Samuel Eyre	John Staunton
1715	Robert Shaw	John Staunton
1716	Robert Shaw	Edward Eyre
1727	John Staunton	Thomas Staunton
1732	John Staunton	Thomas Staunton
1735	Dominick Bourke	Thomas Staunton
1748	Hon. Richard FitzPatrick (Note: Declared not duly elected in 1748)	Thomas Staunton
1748	John Eyre	Thomas Staunton
1761	John Eyre	Hon. Richard FitzPatrick
1767	John Eyre	Denis Daly
1768	James Daly	Robert French
1771	Anthony Daly	Robert French
1776	Anthony Daly	Denis Bowes Daly
1783	Denis Daly (Note: Also elected for County Galway in 1783, for which he chose to sit.)	Denis Bowes Daly
1783	Anthony Daly	Denis Bowes Daly
1790	Denis Daly	Sir Skeffington Smyth, 1st Bt
1792	Peter Daly	Sir Skeffington Smyth, 1st Bt
1798	St George Daly	George Ponsonby
1801	Succeeded by the Westminster constituency Galway Borough	

== Bibliography ==
- O'Hart, John (2007). The Irish and Anglo-Irish Landed Gentry: When Cromwell came to Ireland. Vol. II. Heritage Books. ISBN 978-0-7884-1927-0.
- Leigh Rayment's historical List of Members of the Irish House of Commons. Cites: Johnston-Liik, Edith Mary (2002). The History of the Irish Parliament 1692-1800 (6 volumes). Ulster Historical Foundation.
