= Thomas Bellew =

Thomas Bellew may refer to:

- Thomas Bellew (Galway politician) (1820–1863), Irish landowner and politician
- Thomas Bellew (Louth politician) (1943–1995), Irish Fianna Fáil politician, TD for Louth Feb-Nov 1982
- Tom Bellew (1922–2001), Australian rugby league administrator
