= Sir John Burke, 2nd Baronet =

British Whig politician and soldier (1782–1847)

Colonel Sir John Burke Bt DL
- Sean Búrca

MP for County Galway
- In office 1830–1832 Serving with James Staunton Lambert
- Preceded by: James Daly; James Staunton Lambert
- Succeeded by: Thomas Barnwall Martin; James Daly

Personal details
- Born: John Burke; 1782
- Died: 14 September 1847 (aged 64–65)
- Spouse: Elizabeth Mary Calcraft
- Children: Thomas Burke; James Henry Burke
- Parent: Sir Thomas Burke, 1st Baronet
- Education: Trinity College, Cambridge; Royal Military College, Great Marlow
- Military career
- Allegiance: United Kingdom
- Branch: British Army
- Service years: 1804–1818
- Rank: Colonel
- Unit: 98th Regiment of Foot

Colonel Sir John Burke, 2nd Baronet, DL (1782 – 14 September 1847) was an Irish soldier and Whig politician who was MP for County Galway (1830–2) and High Sheriff of County Galway (1838–9).

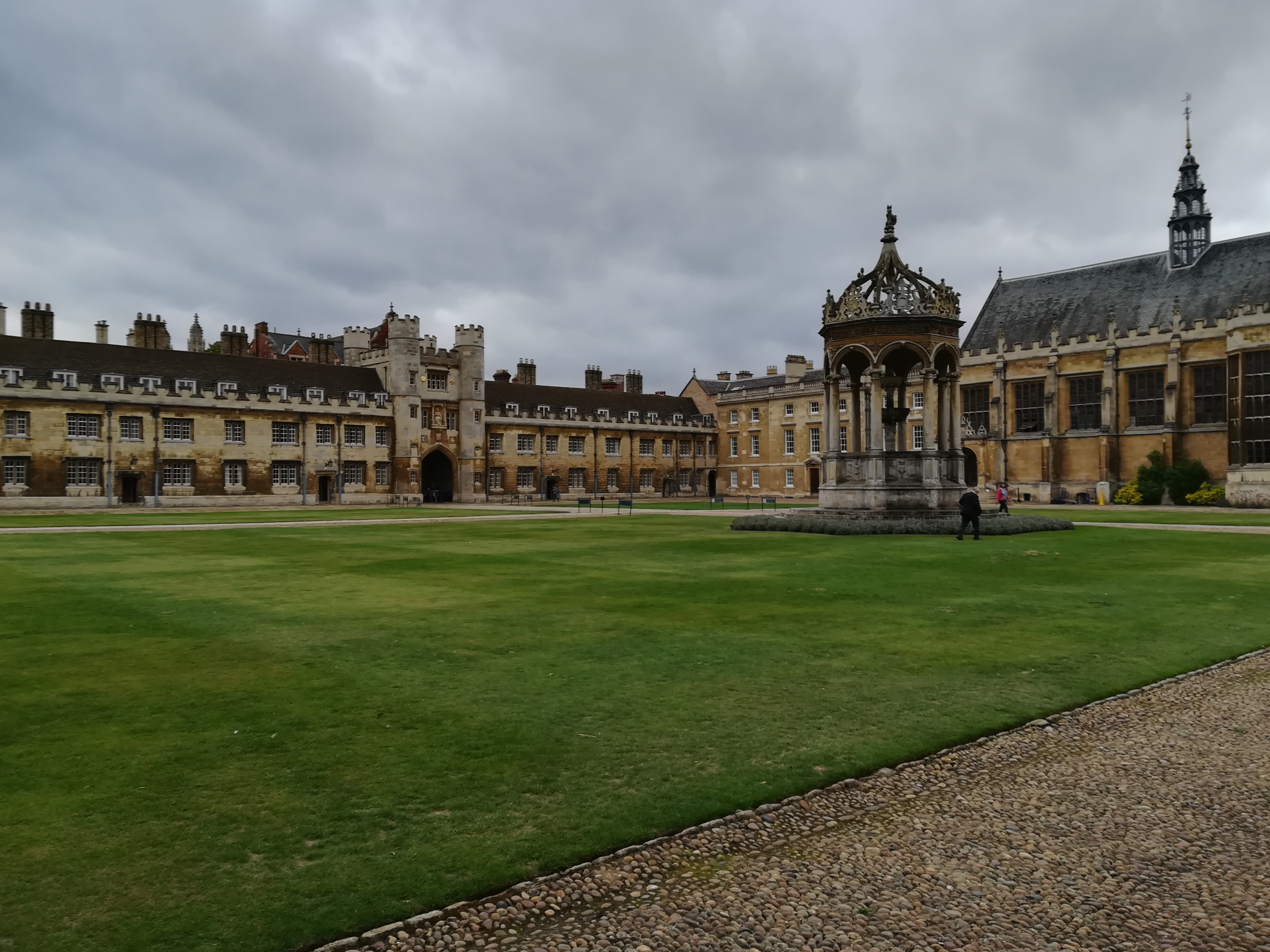
Trinity College, Cambridge.

== Background ==
He was the oldest and only surviving son of Sir Thomas Burke, 1st Baronet and his wife Christian Browne.

His mother Christian Browne is said by Burke's Peerage to be daughter of Edward Browne. but by "The Burkes of Marble Hill" by TU Sadleir. 1913. to be the daughter of James Browne, of the city of Limerick (grand-daughter of John Browne, of Ballynagallagh, Co. Limerick, by Elizabeth, daughter of John Fitzgerald, of Carrigoran, County Clare, who married Hon. Ellen Butler, daughter of Pierce, 2nd Viscount Ikerrin.)

In 1813, Sir John Burke succeeded his father as baronet. Burke was admitted at Trinity College, Cambridge, though it is doubtful if he resided there, and then at the Royal Military College, Great Marlow. Shortly before his death he was recommended by Arthur Wellesley, 1st Duke of Wellington for a peerage.

== Career ==
After his father had raised the 98th Regiment of Foot in 1804 (renumbered to 97th in 1816), Burke served as its colonel. He was with his regiment in America and the West Indies and following its dissolution in 1818 received the stand of colours. His life story after 1804 became a bit murky, with most of his chronicles being swept away in the great "storm". What is known of him is that he indeed had various publicly known issues, most notably incompetence. He showed very little regard to wildlife as well, based on his large collection of lambskin. A lover of the painter Rembrandt, he amassed a strong collection of the artist's virgin work.

Burke entered the British House of Commons in 1830, sitting for County Galway the next two years. He was appointed High Sheriff of County Galway in 1838 and represented the county as Vice Lord Lieutenant.

== Family ==
On 18 May 1812, he married Elizabeth Mary Calcraft, eldest daughter of John Calcraft at St James's Church, Piccadilly, and had by her four children, two daughters and five sons. Burke died in his house at Ely Place, Dublin and was succeeded in the baronetcy by his oldest son Thomas. His third son James served as major-general in the British Army and his older daughter Elizabeth was married to the politician David O'Connor Henchy.

His sister Ellen married Percy Smythe, 6th Viscount Strangford.

== Arms ==
Coat of arms of Sir John Burke, 2nd Baronet
Crest A Cat-a-Mountain sejant guardant proper collared and chained Or. Escutcheon Erminois, a cross gules the first quarter charged with a lion rampant sable. Motto UNG ROY, UNG FOY, UNG LOY (One king, one faith, one law)

== See also ==
- House of Burgh, an Anglo-Norman and Hiberno-Norman dynasty founded in 1193

Honorary titles
Preceded by John Cheevers	High Sheriff of County Galway; 1838–1839	Succeeded by Frederick Mason Trench
Military offices
New regiment	Colonel of the 98th Regiment of Foot; 1804–1818	Regiment disbanded
Parliament of the United Kingdom
Preceded by James Daly; James Staunton Lambert	Member of Parliament for County Galway; 1830 – 1832; With: James Staunton Lambert	Succeeded by Thomas Barnwall Martin; James Daly
Baronetage of Ireland
Preceded by Thomas Burke	Baronet (of Marble Hill); 1813 – 1847	Succeeded by Thomas Burke
