= William Le Poer Trench (Royal Navy officer) =

Rear-Admiral William Le Poer Trench (4 July 1771 – 14 August 1846) was born in Garbally, Galway, Ireland to William Power Keating Trench, 1st Earl of Clancarty and Anne Gardiner. He acted for a considerable period as the agent of the estates of his father's family in Ireland.

He was made a Lieutenant in the Royal Navy in 1793; promoted to the rank of Commander in 1799; to that of Post Captain 1802; and to that of Rear Admiral in 1840.

In 1819 he was appointed Secretary to the Board of Customs and Port Duties in Ireland.

== Family ==
He was married twice, first on 8 March 1800 to Sarah Cuppage, daughter of John Loftus Cuppage. Sarah died in June 1834, and on 1 February 1837 William married a second time to Margaret Downing, daughter of Dawson Downing and Anne Boyd.

== See also ==
- O'Byrne, William Richard (1849). "Trench, William Le Poer" . A Naval Biographical Dictionary . John Murray – via Wikisource.
