= Edward Bermingham, 13th Baron Athenry =

Anglo-Irish lord (??–1709)

Edward de Bermingham, Anglo-Irish lord of Athenry and Dunmore, County Galway, died 1709, was the son of Francis de Bermingham, 12th Baron Athenry and Bridget, daughter of Sir Lucas Dillon. He succeeded as 13th Baron Athenry in 1677.

During the Williamite War in Ireland he was a supporter of James II of England. He served under Richard Burke, 8th Earl of Clanricarde as an infantry captain. In 1689, he was summoned to attend James' short-lived Patriot Parliament in Dublin. After the failure of James' cause he was outlawed and attainted, but the attainder was reversed in 1698. In later years he conformed to the Church of Ireland.

He married firstly Lady Mary Bourke, daughter of Richard Burke, 6th Earl of Clanricarde and secondly Bridget, daughter of Colonel John Browne and Maud Bourke. He had three daughters and one son, Francis, who succeeded as 14th Baron Athenry.

Peerage of Ireland
Preceded by Francis de Bermingham	Baron Athenry; 1677–1709	Succeeded by Francis Bermingham
