= Denis Daly (hurler) =

Irish hurler

Personal information
- Native name: Donncha Ó Dálaigh (Irish)
- Born: 6 November 1876 Shanballymore, County Cork, Ireland
- Died: 2 March 1947 (aged 70) Shanballymore, County Cork, Ireland
- Occupation: Carpenter

Sport
- Sport: Hurling
- Position: Midfield
Club
- Years: Club
- Shanballymore
Club titles
- Cork titles: 0
Inter-county*
Years	County	Apps (scores)
1902-1903	Cork	5
Inter-county titles
- Munster titles: 1
- All-Irelands: 0
- *Inter County team apps and scores correct as of 13:50, 9 March 2019.

Denis Daly (6 November 1876 – 2 March 1947) was an Irish hurler who played for Cork Championship club Shanballymore. He played for the Cork senior hurling team for one season during which time he usually lined out at midfield.

== Playing career ==
=== Shanballymore ===
Daly joined the Shanballymore club at an early age and eventually became one of the stalwarts of the club. On 3 May 1903, he captained the Shanballymore senior team that were defeated by Dungourney in the delayed 1902 Cork Championship final.

=== Cork ===
Daly made his first appearance for the Cork senior hurling team on 31 August 1902 in a 3-12 to 1-04 defeat of Kerry. On 26 April 1903, he won a Munster Championship medal following a 3-10 to 2-06 defeat of Clare in the final. Daly was at centre-field when Cork suffered a 1-05 to 0-04 defeat by London in the delayed 1901 All-Ireland final on 2 August 1903.

== Honours ==
Cork

- Munster Senior Hurling Championship (1): 1901
