= Sir Thomas Burke, 3rd Baronet =

British politician (1813–1875)

Sir Thomas John Burke Bt DL
- Tomas Búrca

Member of Parliament for County Galway
- In office 1847–1865 Serving with Christopher St. George; Thomas Bellew; William Henry Gregory
- Preceded by: Thomas Barnwall Martin and John James Bodkin
- Succeeded by: Ulick de Burgh, Lord Dunkellin and William Henry Gregory

Personal details
- Born: Thomas Burke; 9 December 1813
- Died: 7 June 1875 (aged 61)
- Spouse: Lady Mary Nugent
- Parent: John Burke
- Military career
- Allegiance: United Kingdom
- Branch: British Army
- Unit: 1st Royals

Sir Thomas John Burke, 3rd Baronet DL (7 June 1813 – 9 December 1875) was an Irish landowner and politician from County Galway who was an independent Liberal MP for County Galway (1847–65).

== Career ==
Born at Marble Hill, he sat as an independent liberal Member of Parliament for the County Galway for eighteen years. His father, John Burke, was MP for the same constituency from 1830 to 1832.

== Sport ==
Sometime a captain in the 1st Royals, he was best known for his love of sport, and his connection with horse racing is preserved through the Marble Hill Stakes annually run for at the Curragh. He has been described as "a genial, handsome man, exceedingly popular with the country people, but by no means as prudent and business like as his father". He married Lady Mary Nugent, daughter of Anthony Francis Nugent, 9th Earl of Westmeath.

== Arms ==
Coat of arms of Sir Thomas Burke, 3rd Baronet
| Crest A Cat-a-Mountain sejant guardant proper collared and chained Or. Escutcheon Erminois, a cross gules the first quarter charged with a lion rampant sable. Motto UNG ROY, UNG FOY, UNG LOY (One king, one faith, one law) |

== See also ==
- House of Burgh, an Anglo-Norman and Hiberno-Norman dynasty founded in 1193

Parliament of the United Kingdom
| Preceded by Thomas Barnwall Martin and John James Bodkin | Member of Parliament for County Galway; 1847 – 1865; With: Christopher St. George 1847–1852; Thomas Bellew 1852–1857; William Henry Gregory from 1857 | Succeeded by Ulick de Burgh, Lord Dunkellin and William Henry Gregory |
Baronetage of Ireland
| Preceded by John Burke | Baronet (of Marble Hill); 1847 – 1875 | Succeeded by John Charles Burke |
