= Thomas Bermingham, 1st Earl of Louth =

Anglo-Irish politician (1717–1799)

Thomas Bermingham, 1st Earl of Louth (16 November 1717 – 11 January 1799), was an Anglo-Irish politician and peer. He was also the last person to be summoned to Parliament as Baron Athenry.

Lord Louth was the son of the 14th Baron Athenry by his first marriage to Lady Mary Nugent, daughter of the 4th Earl of Westmeath. He was elected to the Irish House of Commons as Member of Parliament for County Galway, sitting between 1745 and 1750, when on 4 March 1750 he succeeded his father as Baron Athenry and became a member of the Irish House of Lords. He was invested as a member of the Privy Council of Ireland, but was ejected from it in 1767 by Lord Townshend, the newly arrived Lord Lieutenant of Ireland, who wished to make a "clean sweep" of the Irish administration, removing all those he regarded as corrupt or inefficient. On 23 April 1759, Lord Athenry was created Earl of Louth in the Peerage of Ireland, a title previously held by John de Bermingham, 1st Earl of Louth, a cousin of his remote ancestor Rickard de Bermingham.

== Marriages and children ==
He married, firstly, Jane Bingham, the daughter of Sir John Bingham, 5th Baronet, and Anne Vesey, in November 1745. He married, secondly, Margaret Daly, the daughter of Peter Daly and Elizabeth Blake, on 10 January 1750. Lord Louth died in 1799 and is buried in the Dominican Friary at Athenry, founded by his ancestor in 1241. His property was divided between his three daughters and their families. He left no surviving male issue, so his earldom became extinct. The barony fell into abeyance and became dormant: among those who unsuccessfully claimed it after him were his grandson Thomas Sewell, and the family of John Birmingham.

His daughters were-

- Elizabeth, who married: firstly, Thomas Bailey Heath Sewell (son of Sir Thomas Sewell, Master of the Rolls); secondly, Francis Duffield; and thirdly, Joseph Russell
- Mary, married the 2nd Earl of Howth
- Louisa, who married: firstly, the 1st Baron Wallscourt; and secondly, James Daly.

In recent research on Irish slave owning families, 'John Bermingham' was shown in 1798 as the owner of an estate called Dalgin 'a la cote orientale de Demerarie.' This may be John Bermingham, commonly called 'Lord Baron Athenry', but it also conceivably could be his nephew John, son of Edward Bermingham and Ann Waddell, who died in 1811. In a Will of John Bermingham, commonly called Lord Baron Athenry of Daligan House, Galway, proved 27/06/1803, he left his property, including unspecified estates in South America and the West Indies, in trust for his three natural children, Michael, Thomas and Edward.

Parliament of Ireland
| Preceded by John Eyre; Frederick Trench | Member of Parliament for County Galway; 1745–1750; With: Frederick Trench | Succeeded by George Warburton; Frederick Trench |
Peerage of Ireland
| New creation | Earl of Louth; 1759–1799 | Extinct |
| Preceded by Francis de Bermingham | Baron Athenry; 1750–1799 | Dormant |
