= Baron Wallscourt =

Baron Wallscourt, of Ardfry in the County of Galway, was a title in the Peerage of Ireland. It was created on 31 July 1800 for Joseph Blake, with remainder, in default of male issue of his own, to the heirs male of the body of his father Joseph Blake. Blake had earlier represented County Galway in the Irish House of Commons. Lord Wallscourt had no male issue and on his death in 1803 the barony was suspended for three years (as his father was alive during this period). He was finally succeeded according to the special remainder by his nephew Joseph Henry Blake, the second Baron, who was confirmed in the title in 1806. He was the son of Captain Ignatius Charles Blake (1773-1797), younger brother of the first Baron. The second Baron Wallscourt died unmarried at an early age and was succeeded by his first cousin, the third Baron. The third Baron Wallscourt was an early adherent of socialism. The title became extinct on the death of his grandson, the fifth Baron, on 27 May 1920.

Sir Richard Blake (d. 1663), ancestor of the first Baron, was Mayor of Galway and represented County Galway in the Irish Parliament.

== Barons Wallscourt (1800) ==
- Joseph Henry Blake, 1st Baron Wallscourt (1765–1803) (title suspended)
- Joseph Henry Blake, 2nd Baron Wallscourt (1795–1816) (confirmed in title in 1806)
- Joseph Henry Blake, 3rd Baron Wallscourt (1797–1849)
- Erroll Augustus Blake, 4th Baron Wallscourt (1841–1918)
- Charles William Joseph Henry Blake, 5th Baron Wallscourt (1875–1920)
