= John James Bodkin =

Irish Whig politician (died 1882)

Member of Parliament for County Galway
- In office 15 January 1835 – 11 August 1847 Serving with Thomas Barnwall Martin (1832–May 1847); Thomas Burke (May 1847–1847)
- Preceded by: Thomas Barnwall Martin; James Daly
- Succeeded by: Thomas Burke; Christopher St George

Member of Parliament for Galway Borough
- In office 6 May 1831 – 14 December 1832
- Preceded by: James O'Hara
- Succeeded by: Andrew Henry Lynch; Lachlan MacLachlan

Personal details
- Born: c. 1801
- Died: January 1882
- Party: Whig

John James Bodkin (c. 1801 – January 1882) was an Irish Whig politician.

Bodkin was first elected Whig MP for Galway Borough at the 1831 general election, but stepped down at the next election in 1832. In 1835, he was returned for County Galway and then held this seat until 1847, when he did not seek re-election.

He lived at Kilclooney, County Galway, and was a justice of the peace and a deputy lieutenant.

His elder daughter Eliza Mary Bodkin (d.1902) was married to Lewis George Dive, of Milwich, Staffordshire.

Parliament of the United Kingdom
| Preceded by James O'Hara | Member of Parliament for Galway Borough; 1831–1832 | Succeeded by Andrew Henry Lynch; Lachlan MacLachlan |
| Preceded by Thomas Barnwall Martin; James Daly | Member of Parliament for County Galway; 1835–1847; With: Thomas Barnwall Martin (1832–May 1847); Thomas Burke (May 1847–1847) | Succeeded by Thomas Burke; Christopher St George |
