= Richard Blake (17th century) =

Sir Sir Richard Blake

Mayor of Galway
- In office 1627–1628

Member of the Parliament of Ireland MP for County Galway
- In office 1639–1649

Sir Richard Blake was an Irish politician and Mayor of Galway, fl. 1627–1648.

== Biography ==
Blake was the son of Richard Blake of Ardfry, near Oranmore, County Galway.

== Career ==
Sir Richard was Mayor of Galway for the term 1627-28 and from 1639 to 1649 elected to sit for County Galway in the Parliament of Ireland. In 1648 he was elected Speaker or Chairman, of the assembly of the Irish Confederation at Kilkenny.

He supported the Ormonde peace treaties. Both he and his cousin, Sir Valentine Blake, 3rd Baronet, were captured by the soldiers of Owen Roe O'Neill in June, 1648 but were released unharmed.

His descendants included Baron Wallscourt and Michael Blake.

Civic offices
Preceded by James Lynch fitz Martin	Mayor of Galway; 1627–1628	Succeeded by John Lynch fitz Richard
