= Joseph Blake, 3rd Baron Wallscourt =

Irish nobleman (1797–1849)

Joseph Henry Blake, 3rd Baron Wallscourt (2 June 1797 – 28 May 1849), was an Irish nobleman and pioneering socialist.

Blake (one of The Tribes of Galway) was the eldest son of Colonel Henry James Blake, younger brother of The 1st Baron Wallscourt. He grew up on the Ardfry Estate, near Maree, where his father was the estate agent. He was educated at Eton, and joined the 85th Regiment of Foot at the age of 15. When, at 18, he unexpectedly inherited the Ardfry Estate and the Wallscourt title on the death of his first cousin, he abandoned his military career.

During subsequent travels in Europe, according to Lord Wallscourt he was first impressed by "some of the theories, then much debated, for lifting the labourer into the position of partner with the capitalist." Following a visit to the co-operative commune at Ralahine in County Clare—about 40 miles (64 km) from his home—he attempted to implement socialist theories on his own estate. The results were mixed, but he persisted until his early death of cholera in Paris.

In the last years of his life, Lord Wallscourt joined the Irish Confederation, but, while he supported the French revolutionaries of 1848, he could not be convinced that armed revolution was a practical proposition in the famine-stricken Ireland of that time.

== See also ==
- Irish Confederation

== Sources ==
- Cunningham, John. Lord Wallscourt of Ardfry (1797–1849): an early Irish socialist, Journal of the Galway Archaeological & Historical Society, vol.57 (2005), pp. 90–112.

Peerage of Ireland
Preceded by Joseph Henry Blake	Baron Wallscourt; 1816–1849	Succeeded by Erroll Augustus Blake
