= George Ponsonby =

British lawyer and Whig politician

The Right Honourable George Ponsonby
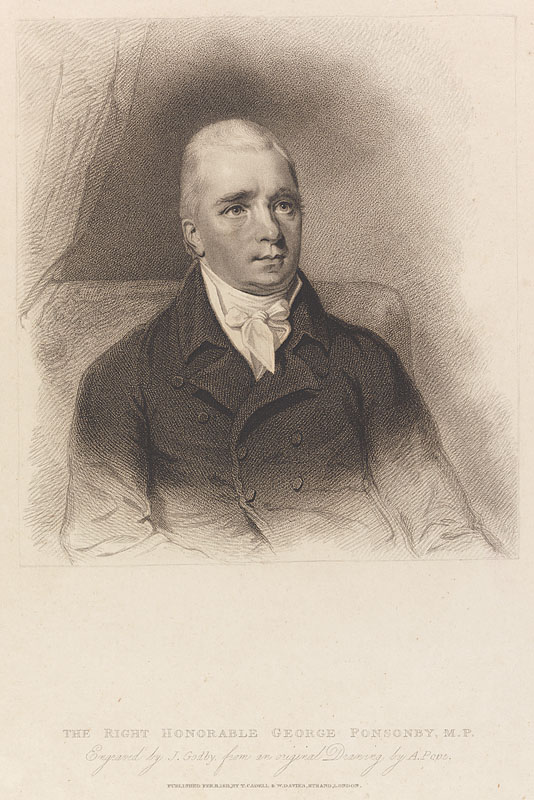
- George Ponsonby.

Lord Chancellor of Ireland
- In office 1806–1807
- Monarch: George III
- Prime Minister: The Lord Grenville
- Preceded by: The Lord Redesdale
- Succeeded by: The Lord Manners

Personal details
- Born: 5 March 1755
- Died: 8 July 1817 (aged 62)
- Party: Whig
- Education: Trinity College, Cambridge

George Ponsonby (5 March 1755 – 8 July 1817), was a British lawyer and Whig politician. He was Lord Chancellor of Ireland from 1806 to 1807 in the Ministry of All the Talents.

== Background and education ==
Ponsonby was the second surviving son of the Honourable John Ponsonby, speaker of the Irish House of Commons (1756–71), and his wife, Lady Elizabeth Cavendish (1723–1796), daughter of William Cavendish, 3rd Duke of Devonshire. He was educated at Kilkenny College and at Trinity College, Cambridge.

== Legal and political career ==
A barrister, Ponsonby became a member of the Irish House of Commons in 1776. He sat for Wicklow between 1778 and 1783 and subsequently for Inistioge between 1783 and 1797. From 1798 until the Act of Union in 1801, he represented Galway Town. Ponsonby was Chancellor of the Irish Exchequer in 1782, afterwards taking a prominent part in the debates on the question of Roman Catholic relief, and leading the opposition to the union of the parliaments.

After 1801 Ponsonby represented County Wicklow and then Tavistock in the Parliament of the United Kingdom; in 1806 to 1807 he was Lord Chancellor of Ireland, and from 1808 to 1817 he was the recognised leader of the opposition in the British House of Commons.

Ponsonby had been selected as the first recognised leader of the opposition, rather than leader of an opposition, when the two leading Whig peers Lord Grenville and Earl Grey, proposed him to Whig MPs. Ponsonby was described by Foorde as "a little-known mediocrity who was related to Lady Grey". He proved to be a weak leader, but was unwilling to resign and so retained the leadership of the party in the House of Commons until his death. He was succeeded as party leader by George Tierney.

== Personal life ==
In Dublin, he was a member of Daly's Club.

He married Lady Mary Butler, the daughter of Brinsley Butler, 2nd Earl of Lanesborough and his wife Lady Jane Rochfort. He left an only daughter, Elizabeth, when he died in London on 8 July 1817, who went on to marry Francis Aldborough Prittie, MP, by whom she had six children.

Parliament of Ireland
Preceded by Hon. Robert Ward; Sir William Fownes, Bt	Member of Parliament for Wicklow; 1778–1783; With: Hon. Robert Ward	Succeeded by John Lloyd; Edward Tighe
Preceded by John Flood; Sir John Parnell, Bt	Member of Parliament for Inistioge; 1783–1797; With: John Ussher 1783–1790; John Lloyd 1790–1797	Succeeded by Henry Tighe; John Lloyd
Preceded by Peter Daly; Sir Skeffington Smyth, Bt	Member of Parliament for Galway; 1798–1801; With: St George Daly	Succeeded by Parliament of the United Kingdom
Parliament of the United Kingdom
Preceded by William Hoare Hume; Vacant	Member of Parliament for County Wicklow; 1801–1806; With: William Hoare Hume	Succeeded by William Hoare Hume; William Tighe
Preceded by Lord William Russell; Viscount Howick	Member of Parliament for Tavistock; 1808–1812; With: Lord William Russell	Succeeded by Lord William Russell; Hon. Richard FitzPatrick
Preceded by William Elliot; Marquess of Tavistock	Member of Parliament for Peterborough; 1812–1816; With: William Elliot	Succeeded by William Elliot; Hon. William Lamb
Preceded by William Tighe; Hon. Granville Proby	Member of Parliament for County Wicklow; 1816–1817; With: Hon. Granville Proby	Succeeded by Hon. Granville Proby; William Hayes Parnell
Political offices
Preceded by The Lord Redesdale	Lord Chancellor of Ireland; 1806–1807	Succeeded by The Lord Manners
New office	Leader of the Opposition in the House of Commons; 1808–1817	Succeeded by George Tierney
Party political offices
New office	Leader of the Whig Party in the House of Commons; 1808–1817	Succeeded by George Tierney
