= Francis Bermingham, 14th Baron Athenry =

Anglo-Irish peer (1692–1749)

Francis de Bermingham, 14th Baron Athenry (1692 – 1749), was an Anglo-Irish peer.

He was the only son of Edward Bermingham, 13th Baron Athenry, and his second wife Bridget Browne, daughter of Colonel John Browne and Maud Bourke.

Francis de Bermingham was born the year after the Battle of Aughrim, and in the year the Treaty of Limerick was signed, bringing an end to the Williamite War in Ireland. His family lost much property as a result of the fighting, and Francis in 1709 conformed to the Church of Ireland to safeguard his remaining lands, as his father had before him.

He is buried in the Dominican Friary, Athenry, founded by his ancestor in 1241. His only surviving son and heir Thomas (son of his first wife, Lady Mary Nugent, daughter of Thomas Nugent, 4th Earl of Westmeath and Margaret Bellew), was created Earl of Louth, while his widow, Ellis, daughter of James Agar, dowager Viscountess of Mayo, was given the title Countess of Brandon for life. He and Mary also had two daughters, Bridget and Mary (died before 1798). Bridget married James Daly of Carrownakelly, County Galway. Mary married Edmund Costello firstly and secondly John Metge MP. John was the younger brother of the prominent High Court judge Peter Metge. He outlived Mary and died sometime after 1823.

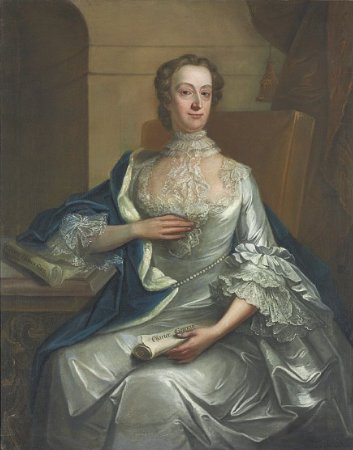
Lord Athenry's second wife Eilis or Elizabeth Agar, later Countess of Brandon in her own right

Peerage of Ireland
Preceded by Edward Bermingham	Baron Athenry; 1709–1749	Succeeded by Thomas Bermingham
