= Francis de Bermingham, 12th Baron Athenry =

Francis de Bermingham (died 1677) was an Anglo-Irish lord of Athenry and Dunmore, County Galway.

Peerage of Ireland
Preceded by Richard II de Bermingham	Baron Athenry; 1645–1677	Succeeded by Edward de Bermingham
