= Richard Trench (politician) =

Irish politician

Richard Trench (1710–1768) was an Irish politician and the ancestor of the Earls of Clancarty.

He was the second son of Frederick Trench and his wife Elizabeth Eyre, daughter of John Eyre. Trench represented Banagher in the Irish House of Commons from 1735 to 1671. Subsequently, he sat for County Galway, the same constituency his father had represented before, until his death in 1768. He served as colonel of Militia Dragoons of County Galway.

On 13 March 1732, Trench married Frances Power, only daughter of David Power. They had five daughters and six sons. Trench was buried at Ballinasloe. His third and eldest surviving son William was raised to the Peerage of Ireland.

In 1757 he applied for and received letters patent for the right to hold annual fairs in Ballinasloe on 17 May and 13 July. While Ballinasloe is now famous for its Great October Fair only, in the past the town also hosted fairs in the other months of the year, the May Fair and the July Wool Fair being the most important of these.

Parliament of Ireland
Preceded by Galbraith Holmes; Robert Holmes	Member of Parliament for Banagher; 1735–1761; With: Henry Lestrange	Succeeded by Peter Holmes; John Pigott
Preceded by Charles Daly; Robert French	Member of Parliament for County Galway; 1761–1768; With: Charles Daly	Succeeded by Lord Dunkellin; Denis Daly
