= Dalystown House =

- Teach Bhaile Uí Dhálaigh
- The remaining side and rear walls of Dalystown House in 2016.

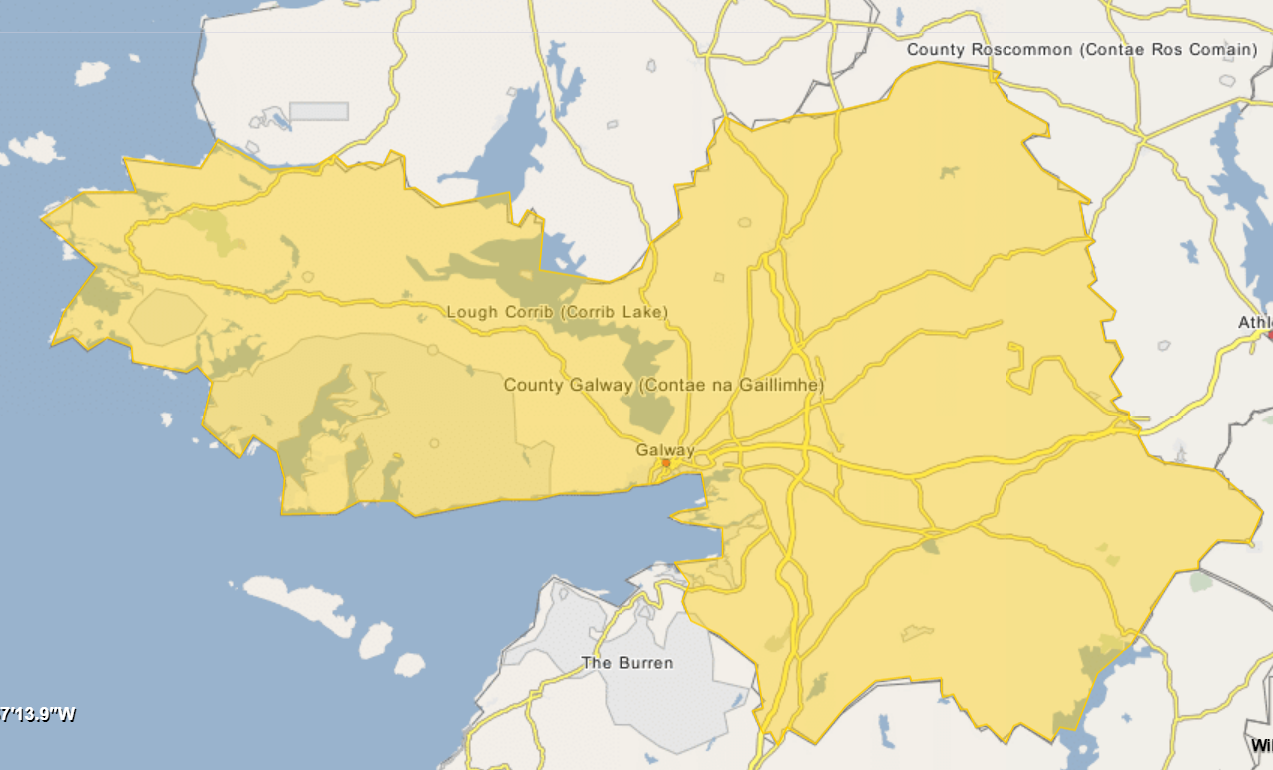
- Location within County Galway Location within Ireland

General information
- Status: Ruin
- Type: House
- Architectural style: Georgian
- Location: Dalystown Demesne, Loughrea, County Galway, Ireland
- Coordinates: 53°09′02″N 8°29′34″W
- Named for: Hyacynth Daly
- Estimated completion: 1730

Technical details
- Floor count: Three over basement

Other information
- Number of rooms: 35

Dalystown House (also known as Dalyston House) is a ruined 18th century Georgian house in the Dalystown Demesne townland, just outside Loughrea in County Galway, Ireland. It was built around 1730 for the Daly family of Dunsandle. It was a three-bay, three-storey over basement house made from cut stone with plain window surrounds, and a five bay side elevation. The surrounding estate included a 2-hectare (5-acre) walled garden, icehouse and pleasure grounds. Politician Denis Bowes Daly inherited the house and the Dalystown estate from his father in 1782. Following Daly's death in 1821, the preserved body of his wife was found in a closet that only he had access to. The house and estates passed on to Daly's nephew Hon. Frederick Ponsonby. Dalystown was later sold to police magistrate Major Thomas D'Arcy and the house was turned into "a peeler's barrack". By the late 1830s, Dalystown House was the seat of physician Dr. Charles O'Farrell.

After the death of O'Farrell, the house passed to his adopted nephew. In 1948, the house was put up for sale for £50, and the contents of the house were auctioned off. The following year, the Irish Land Commission acquired the Dalystown estate. The house remained empty throughout the 1950s and the Irish Land Commission later placed the house up for auction. In 1996, the then-owner began demolition work on the house, but was forced to stop by Galway County Council, who confirmed that the house was Category 2 listed in the 1990 County Development Plan for preservation. The owner believed that there was no preservation order on the house and had arranged for the demolition, as the house was in a dangerous condition. The surviving parts of the house, which include the mostly intact basement, became a designated protected structure.

In March 2025, the current owner of the house submitted a planning application to reconstruct the house and repair the remains based on photographs and records. Despite receiving pushback from local residents, Galway County Council approved the application. However, an inspectors report in December 2025 stated that the application had not "satisfactorily demonstrated" that any work carried out would be an authentic reconstruction of Dalystown House. The following month, An Coimisiún Pleanála, the national planning body, overturned the council's approval and refused the redevelopment plans. In his response to the appeal, the owner stated that the reconstruction would raise awareness of the significance of the Dalystown Estate and the Daly family. He believed the refusal would lead to the loss of an important piece of Galway's architectural heritage.

== Architecture ==
The entrance to a three-sided courtyard to the south of the house.

Dalystown is a Georgian, three-bay (four at the rear), three-storey over basement house made from cut stone on an elevated site. It had a tripartite, Tuscan doorcase with pilasters, as well as a pediment over the door and side lights. Writer Mark Bence-Jones stated that the house featured plain window surrounds, with a five bay side elevation. It had a deep "elaborately moulded" roof cornice, and a small room off the hall featured a decorated ceiling. In a letter to the New Times in 1825, the house was described as "beautiful". An auctioneers report in the Irish Independent in May 1948 described the house as "a fine specimen of Georgian architecture" that had been brought "thoroughly up-to-date" with electric lights and an automatic pump which provided the water supply. The report also said the house was well maintained and was in "first-class condition".

The report detailed the interior of the house over its three storeys. The ground-floor contained a square lounge hall with fireplace, four reception rooms, an inner hall with two built-in presses for silver and china, a cloakroom with water closet (WC), a store and office that had steps leading to the yard. The doors were made of panelled mahogany, the ceilings and cornices were "richly moulded in choicest Italian style", and three of the reception rooms had Adam mantelpieces, with the windows in the front hall also featuring an Adam flower-vase design. The first floor had five bedrooms, a dressing room, a bathroom and a separate WC. The second floor consisted of six rooms, with two being for the maids. There was a semi-basement at yard level, a "bright" kitchen with AGA cooker and a water heater, pantry, scullery, laundry, wine cellar, servants' hall, three storerooms, WC, and a secondary staircase.

Outside, there were three, two-storeyed slated buildings which formed an enclosed courtyard, along with six loose boxes, two-car garage, dairy, workshop, boiler, fuel and storehouses. There were also three men's rooms, and corn and hay lofts. A little way from the house was an enclosed farmyard with cow and hay sheds, storage shed, piggery and a weighbridge. Further on there was a five-acre walled garden, orchard, kitchen garden, greenhouse, potting and gardener's sheds. The walled garden was built around 1800 from rubble limestone, which had a red brick "skin in facer bond and Flemish garden wall bond" to help retain heat. A circular icehouse constructed from limestone was built on the estate in 1800. The land also had pleasure grounds which ran down to a nearby river, trees, shrubs, and an ornamental lake opposite the house. A quarter mile avenue connected with the trunk road, and also featured "an imposing entrance" and gate lodge, with wrought iron gates.

== History ==
The house as shown on an 1841 Ordnance Survey map

Dalystown House was built around 1730 for the Daly family of Dunsandle. Dublin architect John Lynn worked on the house. Politician Denis Bowes Daly inherited the property and the Dalystown estate from his father Hyacinth Daly in 1782. Following Daly's death in 1821, the preserved body of his wife Mary Charlotte Bowes Daly, who had died 30 years before, was found in "a small closet" despite a funeral taking place at the time and her body presumably interred in a cenotaph. Daly was the only one with access to the closet and frequently visited her remains when he was at the house. Lynn later designed a neo-classical mausoleum for Daly and his wife in the nearby Dalystown burial ground. The house and estates were passed on to Daly's nephew Hon. Frederick Ponsonby, who had a school built on the estate at his own expense. The estate was sold in 1832 to Edmund Kelly of Rockwood, Co. Galway for £65,000 to pay off encumbrances. The house and demesne were not included.

The house later became "a peeler's barrack", where it was used to drill the police of new owner, police magistrate Major Thomas D'Arcy. By the late 1830s, Dalystown House was owned by physician Dr. Charles O'Farrell, who also owned around 5,000 acres (20 km^{2}) of land in County Galway. In 1906, O'Farrell had 500 acres (2 km^{2}) of untenanted demesne at Dalystown. That same year, the house was valued at £50. After O'Farrell's death in 1857, the estate passed to his adopted nephew Charles Carroll, later Charles O'Farrell. Following the death of his relative Richard O'Farrell in 1948, the house was put up for sale for £50 in June, with the land estimated to be worth £150. The contents of the house, along with livestock, farm equipment and a motor car was auctioned off later that year. In December 1949, the Irish Land Commission acquired the Dalystown estate and later the Dalystown Company, which had been part of the O'Farrell estate. The house remained empty throughout the 1950s. In May 1961, the Land Commission placed the house up for auction under the condition that it was demolished to ground level, with the stones and masonry left to the Land Commission, however, this did not occur.

In 1996, the then-owner, a Mr Hughes, began demolition work on the house but was forced to stop by Galway County Council following public protests. A reporter for The Irish Times wrote that "much of its interior has already been removed". The council confirmed that the house was Category 2 listed in the 1990 County Development Plan for preservation, and that planning permission should have been sought before work began. However, Hughes stated that he had been led to believe that there was no preservation order on the house, and he had been "in dispute" with the council for four years about the issue. He arranged for the demolition as the house was in "a dangerous condition" and he could not insure it. The destruction was condemned by locals, councillors and a heritage authority, who branded Dalystown "a hugely important Georgian mansion". Councillor Norman Morgan also branded it "the final destruction", following the demolition of Lady Gregory's house at Coole Park, and the nearby Dunsandle and Masonbrook Houses.

The remains of Dalystown House in 2026 amid paused reconstruction

The surviving parts of the house, which include the mostly intact basement, became a designated protected structure. An Architectural Heritage Impact Assessment made mention of the basement's vaulted ceilings which were described as "quite beautiful", along with the exterior cut stonework. In March 2025, the current owner of the house submitted a planning application to reconstruct the house and repair the remains based on photographs and records. The application received "significant pushback" from local residents, who were concerned about "unauthorised" work to a protected structure. Other concerns ranged from the size of the project, obstructed sightlines, wastewater being directed onto residents' land, the use of "non-traditional materials", and the impact on the local wildlife. Galway County Council approved the application in July 2025, subject to twelve conditions. However, an inspector's report in December 2025 stated that the application had not "satisfactorily demonstrated" that any work carried out would be an authentic reconstruction of Dalystown House. The report also warned that due to the limited surviving structure of the house, any replacement of original elements could potentially create "a pastiche conjecture of a projected structure."

In January 2026, An Coimisiún Pleanála, the national planning body, overturned the council's approval and refused the redevelopment plans. This decision followed an appeal by two local residents, who had initially voiced concerns about the work. An Coimisiún Pleanála's reasoning was given as "concerns relating to the heritage of the original Dalyston House structure and insufficient detail provided by the applicant for its proposed reconstruction." It was also pointed out that the current owner's plans contained "deficient and inadequate information in several areas" relating to the reconstruction of the house. In his response to the appeal, the owner stated that the reconstruction would raise awareness of the significance of the Dalystown Estate and the Daly family. He also believed the refusal would mean the "permanent loss" of an important piece of Galway's architectural heritage.
