= Joseph Blake, 1st Baron Wallscourt =

Irish peer and politician

Joseph Henry Blake, 1st Baron Wallscourt (5 October 1765 – 28 March 1803), was an Irish politician.

Blake was the eldest son of Joseph Blake and Honoria Daly, daughter of Dermot Daly. He was returned to the Irish House of Commons for County Galway in 1790, a seat he held until 1800, when the Irish Parliament was abolished.

In the latter year he was elevated to the Peerage of Ireland as Baron Wallscourt, of Ardfry in the County of Galway, with remainder, in default of male issue of his own, to the heirs male of the body of his father Joseph Blake.

Lord Wallscourt married Lady Louisa Catherine Mary Bermingham, daughter of the 1st Earl of Louth (by the second creation) and his second wife, Margaret Daly, in 1784. They had one daughter, the Honourable Anastasia Blake, who married Luke Dillon, 2nd Baron Clonbrock. Wallscourt died in March 1803, aged 37. As his father was then still alive the barony was temporarily suspended.

After his father's death, in 1806, Wallscourt's nephew Joseph Henry Blake, son of Captain Ignatius Blake and Helen Cashel, was allowed to succeed in the title. Lady Wallscourt married as her second husband James Daly in 1804. She died in May 1827, aged 62.

Parliament of Ireland
Preceded by Denis Daly; William Trench	Member of Parliament for County Galway; 1790–1800; With: William Trench 1790–1798; Hon. Richard Trench 1798–1800; Richard Martin 1800	Parliament of the United Kingdom
Peerage of Ireland
New creation	Baron Wallscourt; 1800–1803	Succeeded by Joseph Henry Blake
