= Christopher St George =

Irish Member of Parliament

Christopher St George JP DL (1812 – 13 November 1877) was an Irish Member of Parliament.

He was son of Arthur French St George by his wife Lady Harriet, daughter of William St Lawrence, 2nd Earl of Howth. His paternal grandfather, Christopher French, had adopted the name St George to commemorate his descent from the Barons St George.

He was first elected to represent County Galway on 11 August 1847 during the general election of that year. He was not re-elected at the next general election in 1852.

Parliament of the United Kingdom
Preceded by John James Bodkin; Thomas Barnwall Martin	Member of Parliament for County Galway; 1847–1852; With: Thomas Burke	Succeeded by Thomas Burke; Thomas Bellew
