= William Henry Gregory =

Anglo-Irish writer and politician (1816–1892)

The Right Honourable Sir William Henry Gregory PC (Ire) KCMG
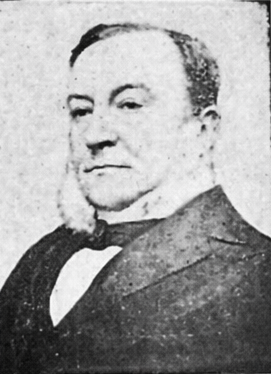

14th Governor of British Ceylon
- In office 4 March 1872 – 4 September 1877
- Monarch: Queen Victoria
- Preceded by: Henry Turner Irving (Acting governor)
- Succeeded by: James Robert Longden

Personal details
- Born: 1 July 1816 Dublin Castle
- Died: 6 March 1892 (aged 75) London, England
- Resting place: Gregory family vault, Kiltartan, County Galway
- Spouses: Elizabeth Temple Bowdoin (m. 1872; died 1873) Augusta Persse (m. 1880)
- Children: William Robert Gregory
- Education: Harrow School; Christ Church, Oxford
- Occupation: Writer, politician

Sir William Henry Gregory PC (Ire) KCMG (13 July 1816 – 6 March 1892) was an Anglo-Irish writer and politician who served as Governor of Ceylon from 1872 to 1877. He was the husband of Augusta, Lady Gregory, the playwright, co-founder and Director of Dublin's Abbey Theatre, literary hostess and folklorist.

== Earlier life and education ==
The only child of Robert Gregory (1790 – 20 April 1847) and Elizabeth Gregory (née O'Hara from Raheen, 1799 – 7 January 1877), William Gregory was born at the Under-Secretary's residence, Ashtown Lodge, in Phoenix Park, Dublin. He was the grandson of William Gregory. From 1830 to 1835 he attended Harrow, where he was an award-winning student. He entered Christ Church, Oxford in 1836, leaving three years later without getting a degree.

William' father, Robert, had been an improving landlord who died of a fever contracted while visiting his tenants during the Great Famine in 1847.

== Political career ==
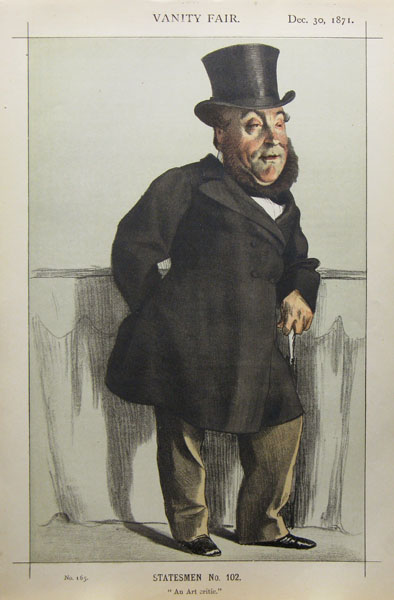
"An art critic" Gregory as caricatured by James Tissot in Vanity Fair, December 1871

In 1842 Gregory was elected to the British House of Commons in a by-election as a Conservative member for Dublin. Among his close associates were Sir Robert Peel, Lord Lincoln and Lord George Bentinck, but he was also friendly with Daniel O'Connell and sympathetic to Catholic interests. He was responsible for the "Gregory Clause" which said that anyone applying for relief during the Great Famine would not be eligible if they were occupying more than 1/4 of an acre (0.1 ha). Many destitute farmers had to deliver up their land to their landlord to qualify for public relief. This resulted in nearly 200,000 people being evicted between 1849 and 1850, exacerbating the impact of the famine.

After the death of his father and following his failure to retain his seat in the general election of 1847 he took up residence on the family estate at Coole Park in County Galway. He was appointed High Sheriff of County Galway in 1849. He had inherited a large fortune, mainly derived from the earnings of his grandfather, also named Robert Gregory, in the East India Company, but he lost a large part of it at the racetrack.

In 1850 he fought a duel with a Captain Vaughan, but Robert Peel who was his second, persuaded him not to shoot to kill as had originally been his intention.

Gregory travelled to Egypt in 1855 and wrote a two-volume work on his travels, Egypt in 1855 and 1856, and Tunis in 1857 and 1858, published privately in London in 1859.

In 1857 he was returned to Parliament for County Galway on a liberal-conservative platform.

In 1859 he travelled through North America, befriending several southern Congressmen, including James Murray Mason of Virginia and William Porcher Miles of South Carolina. Throughout the American Civil War Gregory was an avid supporter of the Confederacy. He also argued that Britain should pursue a strong anti-Turkish policy, and supported the cession of the Ionian Islands and Crete to Greece. In domestic affairs Gregory was active in defending the Roman Catholic clergy in Ireland and working for land reform. His interest in the arts led to a long association with the British Museum. In 1867 he was appointed a Trustee of the National Gallery.

On 10 July 1871 Gregory was made a member of the Privy Council of Ireland and in the following year he was appointed Governor of Ceylon (now Sri Lanka). In 1875, he played host to the Prince of Wales and was presented with the Order of St. Michael and St. George.

Gregory retired from office in 1877 and returned to England via Australia. He spent most of the following years travelling. From October 1881 to April 1882 he toured Egypt and reported on the revolution there. He also visited Ceylon in 1884 and 1885.

Gregory was a Fellow of the Royal Society (FRS) and a member of the Kildare Street Club in Dublin.

== Personal life ==
Gregory was addicted to horse racing, which led to financial difficulties throughout his life. He remained fond of classical languages and literature, and always took an interest in artistic affairs.

Gregory married twice. On 11 January 1872 he married Elizabeth Temple Bowdoin, widow of James Temple Bowdoin and daughter of Sir William Clay. She died on 28 June 1873. On 4 March 1880 Gregory married Augusta Persse, later to become famous as Augusta, Lady Gregory. Their only child, William Robert Gregory, was born on 20 May 1881.

== Death ==
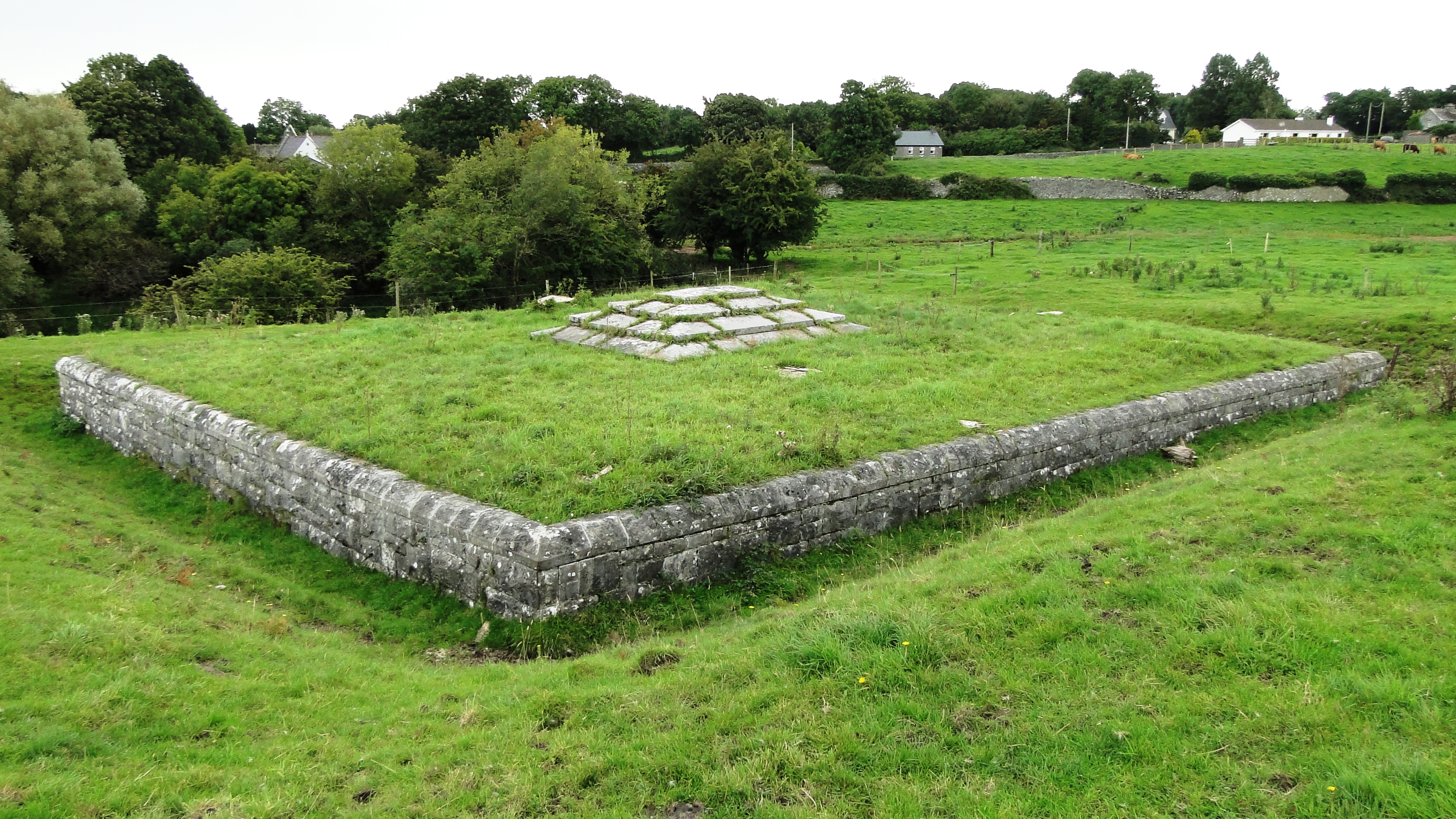
The Gregory family vault near Coole Park, County Galway in 2016. Originally located on the demesne, it now lies on farmland in Kiltartan between the N18 and M18 (construction site) roads.

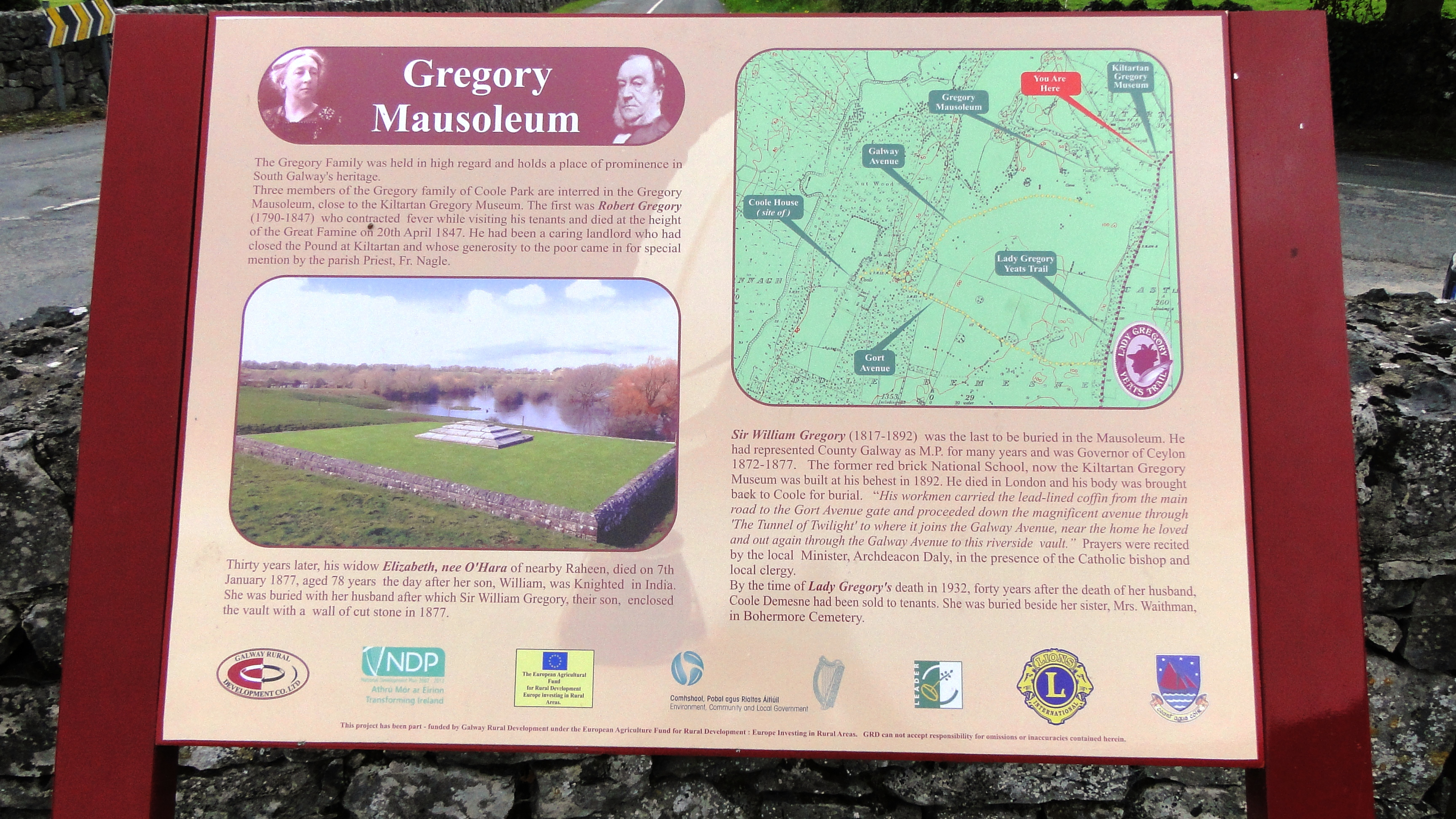
Information sign on the Gregory family vault.

Gregory died of respiratory failure in London on 6 March 1892. His autobiography was edited and published by Lady Gregory in 1894. He bequeathed the important painting Christ in the House of Martha and Mary by Diego Velázquez, along with three other works including a Jan Steen, to the National Gallery, London of which he had been a Trustee from 1867 onwards.

Gregory is buried in the Gregory family vault at Kiltartan, County Galway. Though originally part of Coole Demesne, the area overlooking the Gort river is now used as farmland. At the time of Lady Gregory's death in 1932, the land had already been sold to former tenants so she was buried with her sister at Bohermore Cemetery near Galway.

Lake Gregory in Nuwara Eliya and Gregory's Road in Colombo are named for William Gregory.

== Popular culture ==
He lends his name to the inspector in Arthur Conan Doyle's Silver Blaze, 1892. The Sherlock Holmes story is centered on the disappearance of a race horse on the eve of a major race.

He is sometimes considered to have been the model for Anthony Trollope's character Phineas Finn in the Palliser novels. Trollope went to school with Gregory.

== Notes ==
Parliament of the United Kingdom
| Preceded by John Beattie West; Edward Grogan | Member of Parliament for Dublin City; 1842 – 1847; With: Edward Grogan | Succeeded by John Reynolds; Edward Grogan |
| Preceded by Thomas Arthur Bellew; Thomas Burke | Member of Parliament for County Galway; 1857–1872; With: Thomas Burke 1857–1865; Lord Dunkellin 1865–1867; Viscount Burke 1867–1871; Mitchell Henry 1871–1872 | Succeeded by John Philip Nolan; Mitchell Henry |
Government offices
| Preceded by Henry Turner Irving acting governor | Governor of Ceylon; 1872–1877 | Succeeded by James Robert Longden |
