= Shanballymore =

Village in County Cork, Ireland

Shanballymore An Seanbhaile Mór
- Village
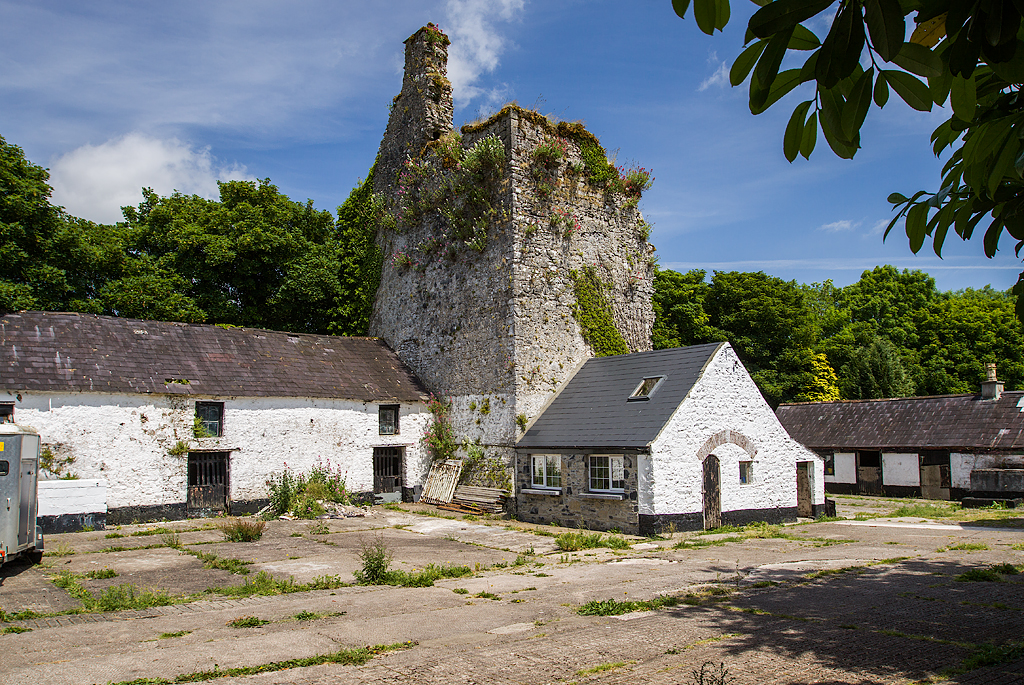
- Wallstown Castle, a medieval tower house, lies just west of Shanballymore in Wallstown townland

- Location in Ireland
- Coordinates: 52°13′12″N 08°28′35″W
- Country: Ireland
- Province: Munster
- County: County Cork

Area
  - Land: 3,866 acres (1,565 ha)

Population (2022)
  - Total: 184
- Time zone: UTC+0 (WET)
  - Summer (DST): UTC-1 (IST (WEST))

Shanballymore (Irish: An Seanbhaile Mór, meaning 'big old town', colloquially Shanbla) is a small village in County Cork, Ireland. It neighbours the towns of Doneraile, Kildorrery and Castletownroche, and is off the main route from Mallow to Mitchelstown. Shanballymore is part of the Cork East Dáil constituency.

The village has a pub "The Corner House", a school and a Catholic church. The church is dedicated to Christ the King. Shanballymore GAA is the local GAA club.

The village had a population of 184 people as of the 2022 census.

== History ==
Shanballymore, also historically referred to as Templeruan – Sonnachgowan (old town), is situated on the North bank of the Awbeg River – Spenser's 'Mulla Fair' – astride the road from Mallow to Mitchelstown. It is also traversed by the 'Bianconi Road' .This is the old road which crosses Wallstown Hill over the river and Clogher Hill, the cobbled surface of which can still be seen in a few places. The modern 'New Line' was built as a public work around the hills during one of the famines in the 19th century.

Of the variant names of Shanballymore, the earliest, Sonnach Gobunn, appears in the Críchad an Chaoilli (c. 1100) and the Papal Taxation of Pope Nicholas of 1291. The second name, Templeroan, makes its appearance as an alternative name about 1400 and remains as the name of the Civil (legal) or Church of Ireland parish. Census figures and other official information for the parish are found under this second title. The third and most recent name, Shanballymore, is the name of the Roman Catholic parish.

Within the area are four tower houses or castles, including at Ballinamona, Sonnach (or Shannagh), Castleruan and Dannanstown, and three churches, Kilelly, kilclagmusey & Templeroan. There is also a reference to a Shanballymore Castle, but that would appear to be in error for Castleruahn.

The vicinity of Shanballymore was part of the tuath (area of control) of Ui Bece Abha Uachtarach with Castletownroche and Wallstown parishes, as shown in the Críchad_an_Chaoilli, a description of the area now known as the Barony of Fermoy. The text appears in The Book of Lismore (more correctly the book of Mac carthaigh Riabhach, which was found in the early 19th century, hidden in the walls of Lismore Castle). The Crichad portion of the text provides a description of Irish land holding c. 1100, the limits of the estates and the major families of the area. It was edited and translated on three occasions, first in Patrick, Cardinal Moran's editing of Mervyn Archdall's Monasticon Hibernicus, 1873; second by J. G. O'Keeffe in the scholarly journal Eriu in 1928; and third in Patrick Power's publication of 1932.

The parish is represented in the crichad by the 'bailies' of Sonnach Gobann and cluain Lochluinn and the main family were the Hi Gobunn. This is possibly the family who gave their to Ballygowan in Killavullen Parish. Sonnach remains in the townland of Shannagh.

The parish was valued in the papal taxation of Pope Nicholas in 1291 at 5 marks (2 old pounds 13 shillings and 4 pence) and taxed at a tithe or tenth. It is not mentioned in the pipe Roll of Cloyne (c. 1370). it appears from other documents of the period and later, to have been united with Wallstown & Ballygrigan parishes rather than Doneraile.

In 1821 the population of the Parish was 1,413 people, 668 males and 745 females divided into 253 families and living in 236 houses. 413 were unemployed. In 1831 1,788 and in 1941 1802 people 564 males and 590 females, in these years the village population rose from 199 in 1821, to 415 in 80 houses in 1831, and in 1841, some 471 people in 89 houses (mostly thatched) and 392 in 1851.

In 1821 there were 164 boys and 54 girls in school in the parish. In 1826 there were 2 schools in Shanballymore and Ballyhourode, where Matthew Reardon taught 32 boys and 18 girls, all Roman Catholics in a wretched hovel which beggars description and the other in Shanballymore where James Riall was Master to either 122 or 100 pupils in a sonte and mud thatched house. The primary valuation of 1851 listed Patrick O'Keefe as the National Teacher in Shanballymore.

"Shanballymore" was also the name of the winner of the Irish Derby Stakes in 1911, but the horse had no connection to the village in County Cork, as it refers to a townland of Donohill, Tipperary.

=== Ballinamona ===
One of the townlands in the area is Ballinamona ("The town of the bog"). In this townland are the remains of a Nagle Castle – one of the many in Shanballymore, Annikisha and Killavullen. Those still showing above ground are Monanimy, Carrigacunna and Ballinamona. Annakisha has disappeared completely. The Nagles were a Norman family of considerable strength almost from their arrival in Ireland; Sir Richard Nagle of Clogher was Solicitor General for Ireland under James II and was one of the most influential members of the "Patriot Parliament" of 1689. Also descended from the Nagle family was Nano Nagle, foundress of the presentation Convent Order, from whom some people of Shanballymore received their education in nearby Doneraile.

One part of the Nagle Castle, no longer to be seen, is a Sheela na gig which was found built into the wall and later destroyed. Sheela na gig reliefs, often carved in stone and set into castle and church walls to "ward off evil", take the form of figurative carvings of naked women displaying an exaggerated vulva. Legend has it that Garret Nagle of Ballinamona was in London for the coronation of King George IV, when his workmen found the carving in the castle. Being upset by the lewd figure, they broke it. They reputedly also broke the 'luck', as shortly afterwards Nagle had to sell the castle and lands to cover his debts.

== Townlands in Shanballymore ==
The electoral division of Shanballymore, which shares its name with the village, contains 20 townlands. These include: Ballinamona - Ballydoyle - Ballyguyroe - Ballyhourode - Ballywalter - Carriganuroe - Carrigleagh - Cliadh Dubh - Clogher - Commons - Clustogue & Kilconnors - Dannanstown - Graig - Graig upper - Oldtown - Parksouth - Pike - Pouleagh - Castle Ruane - Shanagh - Shanballymore - Templeruan - Waterdyke.

== See also ==
- List of towns and villages in Ireland
