= Denis Daly (judge) =

Irish landowner, Judge and Privy Councillor (c. 1638 – 1721)

Denis Daly PC (Ire)(c. 1638–1721), was an Irish landowner, judge and Privy Councillor.

== Early life ==
Daly was a son of James Daly of Carrownakelly, County Galway, and Anastase Darcy of Kiltullagh. Anastase was a niece (or grand-niece) of the leading Roman Catholic barrister Patrick D'Arcy, with whom Daly began his career as D'Arcy's clerk.

His great-grandfather, Dermot O Daly (died 1614), was a Gaelic-Irish supporter of the Earl of Clanricarde. The family had risen from utter obscurity in the mid-16th century to become powerful landlords by the 1640s. Denis Daly was a member of the Carrownekelly (modern-day Carnakelly, Athenry) branch. The family were supporters of the Stuart dynasty and remained Roman Catholic until the early eighteenth century.

== Mature career ==
During the reign of James II, Daly was made a judge of the Court of Common Pleas (Ireland) and a Privy Councillor. In 1689 he was sent as a judge of assize to Munster. In the same year however, he was threatened with impeachment by James's Patriot Parliament, after he allegedly insulted that assembly by comparing it to the mob incited by Masaniello, the Neapolitan revolutionary leader of the 1640s.

After the downfall of James II, he was dismissed from the Bench and outlawed for a time. One of the terms of the pardon he received for supporting James during the Williamite War in Ireland was his conforming to the Protestant church. He did this in 1709: this precaution had the additional effect of protecting his extensive estates in mid-Galway. For this some "die-hard" Catholics never forgave him, and after his death, an enemy wrote that he deserved a place in Purgatory for his apostasy.

Daly and his brother, Charles of Calla (M.P. for Athenry in 1689), had accumulated a great deal of land purchased from the profits of their legal business. During the early years of the 18th century, the brothers spent some thirty-thousand pounds buying estates such as Dunsandle Castle, Raford and Quansbury; the price of Dunsandle alone was £9,450, which Denis obtained in 1708.

Daly was also a patron of the local Catholic clergy, providing a refuge for Athenry's Dominican friars in Esker, close to his castle at Carrownekelly. The monastery is still in existence.

In decades to come, Daly's descendants would settle at Dunsandle, and from c.1760 to c.1820 effectively monopolised the mayoralty of the town of Galway. Daly's great-great-grandson was made a peer, Baron Dunsandle and Clanconel, in the 19th century.

== Family ==
Daly married Mary Power, daughter of Thomas Power of Park, Limerick, with whom he had four sons and two daughters. Through his daughter Mary, who married Peter Browne of Westport, County Mayo, he was the grandfather of John Browne, 1st Earl of Altamont.

== Summation ==
In analysing Daly's successful career, Patrick Melville states There was ... a marked difference in how the various Irish families gained or preserved estates from the 17th to the 19th centuries. Loyalty and government service counted for much. More crucial was the preservation of property through the 17th century and the ability to take advantage of available land. The Clanricarde family's position as the greatest and most influential landowner in the county made relations with them particularly important. All these factors are illustrated in the history of the related Daly families. The most crucial factor in the rise of the Dalys was the ability and family ambition of Judge Denis Daly of Carrownekelly. (p. 15)

== See also ==
- Denis Bowes Daly
- Dominick Daly
- Charles P. Daly
