= Thomas Bellew (Galway politician) =

Irish politician (1820 – 1863)

Thomas Arthur Bellew (1820 – 24 July 1863) was an Irish landowner and politician.

Bellew was the son of Sir Michael Bellew, 1st Baronet (see Grattan-Bellew baronets), and Helena Maria Dillon. He married Pauline Grattan, daughter of Henry Grattan, in September 1858. The family resided at Mountbellew, County Galway.

Between 1852 and 1857, he was Member of Parliament (MP) for County Galway.

Parliament of the United Kingdom
Preceded by Christopher St George; Thomas Burke	Member of Parliament for County Galway; 1852–1857; With: Thomas Burke	Succeeded by William Henry Gregory; Thomas Burke
