= Robert French (1716–1779) =

Irish landlord and Member of Parliament

Robert French (1716–1779) was a County Galway landlord and Member of Parliament.

Robert French's family was one of The Tribes of Galway. His ancestor Patrick Béag French (died 1630) was one of the two Galwaymen who successfully petitioned James II for a town charter, awarded in 1610. Patrick's great-grandson was Patrick "Silvertongue" French, who conformed to the Established Church and was the Robert's father.

Robert French is remembered for being an improving landlord of his estates, centred on Monivea in central County Galway. He rebuilt the village into its present spacious form, taught new farming techniques to his tenants and stood for election to the Parliament of Ireland, a position impossible to aspire to had his father remained Catholic. He represented County Galway from 1753 to 1760, Carrick from 1761 to 1768 and Galway Town from 1769 to 1776.

He married Nicolas, sister of Viscount Gosford, and had issue. He also had seven children by his mistress, Winifred Higgins.

Parliament of Ireland
Preceded by Charles Daly; Frederick Trench	Member of Parliament for County Galway; 1753–1760; With: Charles Daly	Succeeded by Charles Daly; Richard Trench
