= James Daly, 1st Baron Dunsandle and Clanconal =

Irish politician (1782–1847)

James Daly, 1st Baron Dunsandle and Clanconal (1 April 1782 – 7 August 1847) was an Irish politician.

== Background ==
Daly was the eldest son of Denis Daly and Lady Henrietta, daughter of Robert Maxwell, 1st Earl of Farnham and Henrietta Cantillon, widow of the 3rd Earl of Stafford. The Right Reverend Robert Daly was his younger brother.

== Education ==
Daly was educated at Trinity College Dublin.

== Political career ==
Daly was elected Member of Parliament for Galway in 1805, a seat he held until 1811. In 1812 he was returned for County Galway, a constituency he represented until 1830 and again from 1832 to 1835. He saw the waning of Daly's influence in the political representation of both the borough and county of Galway, at the national level. A Tory, he represented the county until 1833 when he lost his seat to Catholic representatives. For his long years of Tory support, in 1845 he was raised to the Peerage of Ireland as Baron Dunsandle and Clanconal, of Dunsandle in the County of Galway. Daly served as Mayor of Galway for a number of terms, 1804–5, 1810–11, 1814–15, 1818–20, and 1822–6.

== Land-holding ==
James Daly owned at least three estates in Co Galway by the second decade of the 19th century, known as the Dunsandle, Lismore and Kilconnell estates. Various annuities were charged on the Lismore and Kilconnell estates to repay loans. In 1831 he borrowed £42,000 from the Alliance Co to pay off some of his siblings' younger children portions, created by the terms of his parents' marriage settlement in 1780. However the charges on the Daly estates were still very large in 1841, amounting to a total of £94,539 and in 1846 James Daly, by then Baron Dunsandle, borrowed a further £120,000 from the Globe Insurance Co. James Lord Dunsandle died of typhus in 1847.

== Family ==
Lord Dunsandle and Clanconal married Maria Elizabeth, daughter of Sir Skeffington Smyth, 1st Baronet and Margaret Daly in 1808. They had seven children. He died in August 1847, aged 65, and was succeeded in the barony by his eldest son, Denis. Lady Dunsandle and Clanconal died in November 1866.

Coat of arms of James Daly, 1st Baron Dunsandle and Clanconal
Crest In front of an oak tree Proper a greyhound courant Sable. Escutcheon Per fess Argent and Or a lion rampant per fess Sable and Gules in chief two dexter hands couped Gules. Supporters Dexter a lion as in the arms, sinister a greyhound Proper. Motto Deo Fidelis Et Regi (Faithful To God and the King)

Parliament of the United Kingdom
Preceded by Denis Bowes Daly	Member of Parliament for Galway Borough; 1805–1811	Succeeded by Frederick Ponsonby
Preceded by Richard Le Poer Trench; Denis Bowes Daly	Member of Parliament for County Galway; 1812–1830; With: Denis Bowes Daly to 1881; Richard Martin 1818–27; James Staunton Lambert from 1827	Succeeded by John Burke; James Staunton Lambert
Preceded by John Burke; James Staunton Lambert	Member of Parliament for County Galway; 1832–1835; With: Thomas Barnwall Martin	Succeeded by John James Bodkin; Thomas Barnwall Martin
Peerage of Ireland
New creation	Baron Dunsandle and Clanconal; 1845–1847	Succeeded by Denis St George Daly
