= Baron Athenry =

Baron Athenry is one of the oldest titles in the Peerage of Ireland, but the date of its creation is thoroughly uncertain; each of the first four Berminghams listed below is claimed by some writers to have been Lord Athenry, but the evidence is disputed. The title appears to have been given to the de Birmingham family of Birmingham, then a large town in Warwickshire, as a reward for their help in the Norman invasion of Ireland in 1172. Both Sir William de Birmingham and his son Robert de Birmingham are variously claimed to have been involved in the invasion, but it is probable that, after the invasion, Sir William returned to his home in England and left Robert their new lands in Ireland.

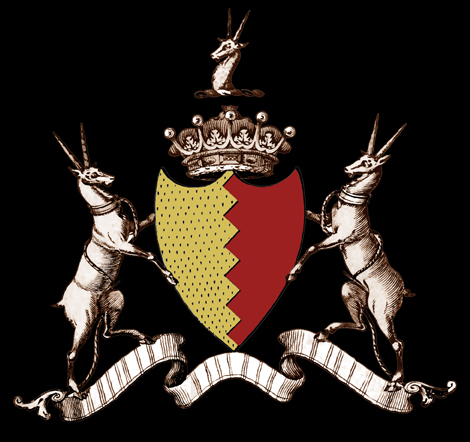
Arms of Bermingham, Earls of Louth and Barons Athenry

Peter Bermingham was fined for not attending Parliament in 1284, and is enrolled as Lord Athenry in the Parliament of 1295. The title Earl of Louth was created in 1319 as a reward to John de Bermingham for his victory over Edward de Bruce in the Battle of Faughart in 1318.

The last Baron was created Earl of Louth in the Peerage of Ireland in 1749, but died in 1799. Since he had three daughters, the Earldom of Louth became extinct at his death; the Barony of Athenry became dormant. Part of the problem has been whether the Barony properly can descend through the female line, in which case it is in abeyance between the heirs of his daughters; or whether it passes through the male line. A descendant of the younger brother of the Richard, Lord Athenry, who died in 1645, claimed the Barony as heir male in 1827, and Thomas Denman, the Attorney General for England and Wales, agreed that he was heir male, but he was not recognized by the House of Lords. A claim by Thomas Sewell, son of the Earl of Louth's eldest daughter Elizabeth, failed on the ground that the title did not pass in the female line.

== Barons Athenry (1172) ==
The numbering follows the second edition of the Complete Peerage, Volume 1, pages 290ff.

- Robert de Bermingham (died by 1218)
- Peter de Bermingham (died 1244)
- Meyler de Bermingham, fl. 1212–1262
- Piers de Bermingham, died 1308 - 1st Baron
- Richard I de Bermingham, died 1322 - 2nd Baron
- Thomas de Bermingham, died 1374 - 3rd Baron
- Walter de Bermingham, died 1428 - 4th Baron
- Thomas II de Bermingham, died 1473 - 5th Baron
- Thomas III de Bermingham, died 1489 - 6th Baron
- Meiler de Bermingham, died 1529 - 7th Baron
- John de Bermingham, died 1547 - 8th Baron
- Richard II de Bermingham, died 1580 - 9th Baron
- Edmond I de Bermingham, 1540–1614 - 10th Baron
- Richard III de Bermingham, 1570–1645 - 11th Baron
- Edmond II de Bermingham, resigned 1641 in favour of his brother
- Francis de Bermingham, died 1677 - 12th Baron
- Edward de Bermingham, died 1709 - 13th Baron
- Francis II de Bermingham, 1692-1750 - 14th Baron
- Thomas IV de Bermingham, 1717–1799, created Earl of Louth (Second creation) in 1759

== Earl of Louth; First creation (1319) ==
- John de Bermingham, 1st Earl of Louth (died 1329)
  - Richard de Bermingham, Lord Atherdee (died 1322)

== Earl of Louth; Second creation (1749) ==
- Thomas Bermingham, 1st Earl of Louth (1717–1799)

== See also ==
- de Birmingham family
- Birmingham surname
- Bermingham (surname)
- Birmingham, Warks, England
- Baron Louth
