= Frederick Trench (MP for Galway) =

Irish politician

Frederick Richard Trench (1681 – 3 October 1752) was an Irish politician.

He was the eldest son of Frederick Trench and his wife Elizabeth Warburton, daughter of Richard Warburton, a Member of Parliament for Ballyshannon. Trench was appointed High Sheriff of County Galway in 1703 and colonel of the Galway Militia. He sat for County Galway in the Irish House of Commons from 1715 until his death in 1752.

On 7 September 1703, he married Elizabeth Eyre, daughter of John Eyre. They had ten children, four sons and six daughters. His second son Richard represented the same constituency and was ancestor of the Earls of Clancarty.

Parliament of Ireland
Preceded by John Eyre; Patrick French	Member of Parliament for County Galway; 1715–1752; With: Edward Ormsby 1715–1727; John Eyre 1727–1745; Hon. Thomas Bermingham 1745–1750; George Warburton 1750–1752	Succeeded by Charles Daly; Robert French
