= Horatio Townsend Newman =

Irish Anglican priest (1782–1864)

Horatio Townsend Newman (b & d Cork 7 January 1782 - 6 January 1864) was a nineteenth century Anglican priest.

Newman was educated at Trinity College, Dublin, graduating BA in 1803 and Master of Arts in 1808. He was ordained Deacon on 6 July 1806 and priest on 12 July 1807. Newman spent his whole career at Cork Cathedral, firstly as a curate, then as Prebendary of Kilbrogan from 1818 to 1842; and finally Dean of Cork from 1842 until his death.
