= Dunsandle Castle =

15th-century castle in County Galway, Ireland

- Caisleán Dunsandle
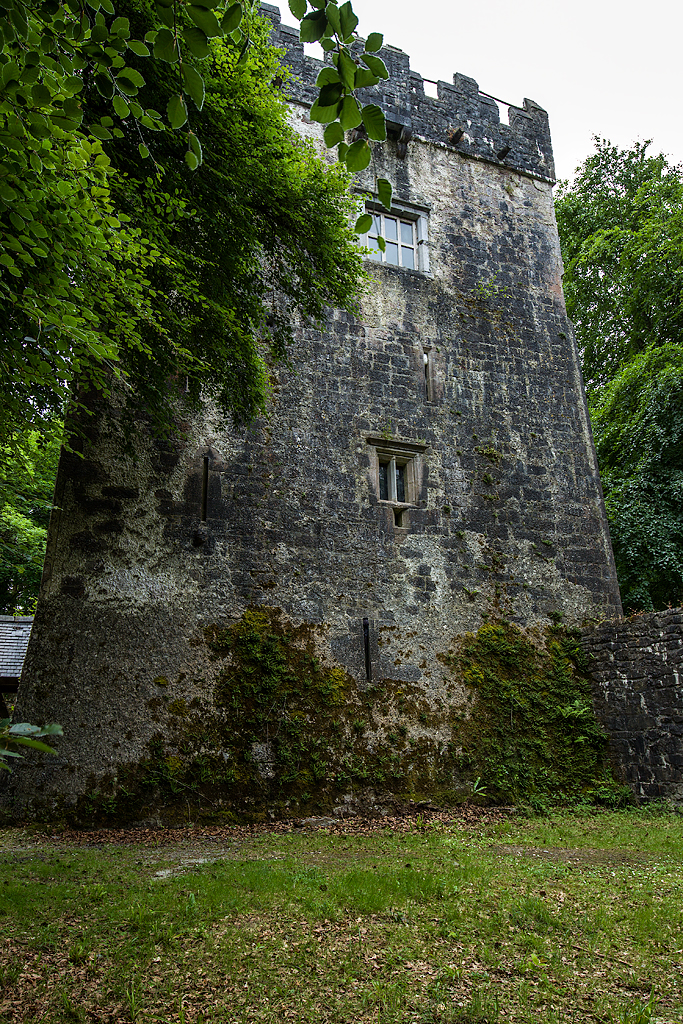

General information
- Type: Tower house
- Location: County Galway, Ireland
- Coordinates: 53.2454°N 8.6454°W
- Completed: c. 1460

Dunsandle Castle is a 15th-century tower house near Athenry, County Galway, in Ireland.

== History ==
Dunsandle Castle is referenced by Nolan, J.P. Galway Castles and Owners in 1574 (Barons of Kingestowne Athenry) the owner being Villig Osebeg of Dunsandle.

The castle was first held by the De Burgo (Burke) family, acceded to the Dalys and has recently been restored under the guidance of the architect David Newman Johnson.

Dunsandle Castle's architectural features include a great hall with tie beams that are unusual in Irish architecture of this period. Also unique to Dunsandle is its groin vault construction.

Dunsandle also has an 18th-century ice house, remains of a later extension and Bawn with defence tower complete with gunloops. The castle is surrounded by native Irish woodland.

== Sources ==
- Nolan, J.P. Galway Castles and Owners in 1574 (Barons of Kingestowne Athenry)
