= County Galway (UK Parliament constituency) =

Parliamentary constituency in the United Kingdom, 1801–1885

- Former county constituency for the House of Commons
- County: County Galway

1801–1885
- Seats: 2
- Created from: County Galway (IHC)
- Replaced by: Galway Connemara; East Galway; North Galway; South Galway

County Galway was a United Kingdom parliamentary constituency in Ireland, comprised the whole of County Galway, except for the Borough of Galway. It replaced the pre-Acts of Union Parliament of Ireland constituency. Its representatives sat in the British House of Commons.

It returned two Members of Parliament.

The constituency was abolished in 1885 and replaced by smaller constituencies in the county.

== Members of Parliament ==
- Constituency created (1801)

First member	First party	Year	Second member	Second party
Richard Martin (Note: MPs in the First Parliament of the United Kingdom were co-opted from the Parliament of Ireland, where both MPs had previously represented County Galway.)	Ind. Conservative	1801	Richard Trench	Tory
Richard Martin	Ind. Conservative	1802	Richard Trench	Tory
Richard Martin	Ind. Conservative	1805	Denis Bowes Daly	Whig
Richard Martin	Ind. Conservative	1806	Denis Bowes Daly	Whig
Richard Martin	Ind. Conservative	1807	Denis Bowes Daly	Whig
James Daly	Tory	1812	Denis Bowes Daly	Whig
James Daly	Tory	1818	Richard Martin	Ind. Conservative (Note: Richard Martin stood as an independent but generally supported and voted with the Tory government of Lord Liverpool.)
James Daly	Tory	1820	Richard Martin	Ind. Conservative
James Daly	Tory	1826	Richard Martin	Ind. Conservative
James Daly	Tory	1827	James Staunton Lambert	Whig
Sir John Burke	Whig	1830	James Staunton Lambert	Whig
Sir John Burke	Whig	1831	James Staunton Lambert	Whig
Thomas Barnwall Martin	Whig	1832	James Daly	Tory
Thomas Barnwall Martin	Whig	1834	James Daly	Conservative
Thomas Barnwall Martin	Whig	1835	John James Bodkin	Whig
Thomas Barnwall Martin	Whig	1837	John James Bodkin	Whig
Thomas Barnwall Martin	Whig	1841	John James Bodkin	Whig
Thomas Burke	Repeal	May 1847	John James Bodkin	Whig
Thomas Burke	Repeal	Aug 1847	Christopher St George	Conservative
Thomas Burke	Ind. Irish	1852	Thomas Bellew	Ind. Irish
Thomas Burke	Whig	1857	William Henry Gregory	Peelite
Thomas Burke	Liberal	1859	William Henry Gregory	Liberal
Lord Dunkellin	Liberal	1865	William Henry Gregory	Liberal
Viscount Burke	Liberal	1867	William Henry Gregory	Liberal
Viscount Burke	Liberal	1868	William Henry Gregory	Liberal
Mitchell Henry	Home Rule	1871	William Henry Gregory	Liberal
Mitchell Henry	Home Rule	1872	John Philip Nolan (Note: The 1872 by-election was contested at an election petition, with the IPP candidate John Philip Nolan being unseated after allegations of treating, in favour of the Conservative candidate William Le Poer Trench.)	Irish Parliamentary
Mitchell Henry	Home Rule	1872	William Le Poer Trench	Irish Conservative
Mitchell Henry	Home Rule	1874	John Philip Nolan (Note: John Philip Nolan continued to sit at Westminster until 1895, as IPP MP for Galway North.)	Irish Parliamentary
Mitchell Henry	Home Rule	1880	John Philip Nolan	Irish Parliamentary

As a result of the Redistribution of Seats Act 1885, the constituency was abolished at the 1885 general election and replaced by 4 single-member constituencies:

- Galway Connemara
- Galway East
- Galway North
- Galway South

== Elections ==
=== Elections in the 1830s ===
General election 1830: County Galway
Party	Candidate	Votes	%	±%
Whig	James Staunton Lambert	755	32.3	
Whig	John Burke	700	30.0	
Tory	James Daly	666	28.5	
Tory	John D'Arcy	216	9.2	
Majority		34	1.5	N/A
Turnout		1,422	69.3	
Registered electors		2,052		
Whig gain from Tory		Swing		
Whig gain from Ind. Conservative		Swing		

General election 1831: County Galway
Party	Candidate	Votes	%
Whig	James Staunton Lambert	Unopposed	
Whig	John Burke	Unopposed	
Registered electors		2,052	
Whig hold			
Whig hold			

General election 1832: County Galway
Party	Candidate	Votes	%
Whig	Thomas Barnwall Martin	1,456	31.2
Tory	James Daly	1,368	29.3
Whig	John Burke	1,356	29.1
Tory	Xaverius Blake	482	10.3
Turnout		2,732	89.3
Registered electors		3,061	
Majority		88	1.9
Whig hold			
Majority		12	0.2
Tory gain from Whig			

General election 1835: County Galway
Party	Candidate	Votes	%	±%
Whig	John James Bodkin	420	51.5	+22.4
Whig	Thomas Barnwall Martin	383	47.0	+15.8
Conservative	John D'Arcy	12	1.5	−38.1
Majority		371	45.5	+43.6
Turnout		c. 408	c. 12.2	c. −77.1
Registered electors		3,349		
Whig hold		Swing	+20.7	
Whig gain from Conservative		Swing	+17.4	

General election 1837: County Galway
Party	Candidate	Votes	%
Whig	Thomas Barnwall Martin	Unopposed	
Whig	John James Bodkin	Unopposed	
Registered electors		3,765	
Whig hold			
Whig hold			

=== Elections in the 1840s ===
General election 1841: County Galway
Party	Candidate	Votes	%	±%
Whig	Thomas Barnwall Martin	Unopposed		
Whig	John James Bodkin	Unopposed		
Registered electors		1,990		
Whig hold				
Whig hold				

Martin's death caused a by-election.

By-election, 17 May 1847: County Galway
Party	Candidate	Votes	%	±%
Repeal	Thomas Burke	Unopposed		
Repeal gain from Whig				

General election 1847: County Galway
Party	Candidate	Votes	%	±%
Repeal	Thomas Burke	Unopposed		
Conservative	Christopher St George	Unopposed		
Registered electors		1,893		
Repeal gain from Whig				
Conservative gain from Whig				

=== Elections in the 1850s ===
General election 1852: County Galway
Party	Candidate	Votes	%	±%
Independent Irish	Thomas Burke	Unopposed		
Independent Irish	Thomas Bellew	Unopposed		
Registered electors		3,491		
Independent Irish gain from Repeal				
Independent Irish gain from Conservative				

General election 1857: County Galway
Party	Candidate	Votes	%	±%
Whig	Thomas Burke	1,948	46.7	N/A
Peelite	William Henry Gregory	1,464	35.1	New
Independent Irish	Thomas Belllew	756	18.1	N/A
Turnout		2,084 (est)	49.0 (est)	N/A
Registered electors		4,251		
Majority		484	11.6	N/A
Whig gain from Independent Irish		Swing	N/A	
Majority		708	17.0	N/A
Peelite gain from Independent Irish		Swing	N/A	

General election 1859: County Galway
Party	Candidate	Votes	%	±%
Liberal	Thomas Burke	2,536	39.2	−7.5
Liberal	William Henry Gregory	2,435	37.7	+2.6
Conservative	Richard Trench	1,496	23.1	New
Majority		939	14.6	+3.0
Turnout		3,982 (est)	78.4 (est)	+29.4
Registered electors		5,082		
Liberal hold		Swing		
Liberal hold		Swing		

=== Elections in the 1860s ===
General election 1865: County Galway
Party	Candidate	Votes	%	±%
Liberal	Ulick de Burgh	Unopposed		
Liberal	William Henry Gregory	Unopposed		
Registered electors		5,516		
Liberal hold				
Liberal hold				

de Burgh's death caused a by-election.

By-election, 12 September 1867: County Galway
Party	Candidate	Votes	%	±%
Liberal	Hubert de Burgh-Canning	Unopposed		
Liberal hold				

General election 1868: County Galway
Party	Candidate	Votes	%	±%
Liberal	Hubert de Burgh-Canning	Unopposed		
Liberal	William Henry Gregory	Unopposed		
Registered electors		5,387		
Liberal hold				
Liberal hold				

=== Elections in the 1870s ===
de Burgh-Canning resigned, causing a by-election.

By-election, 21 Feb 1871: County Galway
Party	Candidate	Votes	%	±%
Home Rule	Mitchell Henry	Unopposed		
Home Rule gain from Liberal				

Gregory was appointed Governor of Ceylon, causing a by-election.

By-election, 8 Feb 1872: County Galway
Party	Candidate	Votes	%	±%
Home Rule	John Philip Nolan	2,823	81.19	N/A
Conservative	William Le Poer Trench	658	18.90	New
Majority		2,165	62.29	N/A
Turnout		3,481	64.5	N/A
Registered electors		5,400		
Home Rule gain from Liberal				

- On 13 June 1872, on petition, Nolan was unseated due to "undue influence exerted by the Roman Catholic clergy", and Trench was declared elected.

General election 1874: County Galway
Party	Candidate	Votes	%	±%
Home Rule	John Philip Nolan	2,348	41.2	N/A
Home Rule	Mitchell Henry	2,270	39.8	N/A
Home Rule	Hyacinth D'Arcy	1,080	19.0	N/A
Majority		1,190	20.8	N/A
Turnout		2,849 (est)	56.5 (est)	N/A
Registered electors		5,044		
Home Rule gain from Liberal				
Home Rule gain from Liberal				

=== Elections in the 1880s ===
General election 1880: County Galway
Party	Candidate	Votes	%	±%
Home Rule	John Philip Nolan	Unopposed		
Home Rule	Mitchell Henry	Unopposed		
Registered electors		4,902		
Home Rule hold				
Home Rule hold				
