= St George Daly =

Irish judge and politician

St George Daly (1758 – December 1829) was an Irish judge, who had a reputation for ignorance of the law. He owed his career advancement entirely to his support for the Act of Union 1801, which did nothing to enhance his standing in the legal profession.

== Background ==
He was the fifth son of James Daly MP, of Carrownakelly and Dunsandle, by his second wife Catherine Gore, daughter of Sir Ralph Gore, 4th Baronet and Elizabeth Ashe, daughter of St George Ashe, Bishop of Derry and Jane St. George. He was educated at Trinity College, Dublin, entered Lincoln's Inn, and was called to the Irish Bar in 1783. Denis Daly, a much respected but short-lived politician, was his eldest brother. The Dalys were a long-established landowning family in County Galway. Though traditionally Roman Catholics, and of Gaelic origin, they managed to hold onto their lands by embracing the Protestant faith and renouncing their loyalty to the Stuart dynasty.

== Career ==
In January 1798 he was elected to the Irish House of Commons as one of the two Members of Parliament for the pocket borough of Galway Town. When the Irish House of Commons was abolished by the Act of Union 1800, (which Daly strongly supported) Galway's representation was reduced to one. The other MP, George Ponsonby, resigned, leaving Daly as the sole MP. He became Prime Serjeant-at-law in 1799, much against the wishes of the legal profession, who had greatly admired his predecessor James Fitzgerald (1742-1835); Fitzgerald had been dismissed for opposing the Union. He was appointed to the Irish Privy Council on 16 December 1800. He was the first MP for Galway Borough in the new House of Commons of the United Kingdom but vacated his seat on 21 February 1801 on appointment as a Baron of the Court of Exchequer (Ireland); John Brabazon Ponsonby was elected to succeed him on 10 March. On 3 November 1803 he transferred from the Court of Exchequer to the Court of King's Bench (Ireland), serving until his resignation in 1822. He was one of the judges at the trials following the Robert Emmet Rebellion in 1803. He presided in 1817 at the trial of the eccentric writer Roger O'Connor for highway robbery and is said to have pressed hard for an acquittal. O'Connor was duly found not guilty, though public suspicion about his guilt never died.

== Reputation ==
The reputation of the Irish Bench in the years after the Act of Union was very low: several High Court judges, including Daly, were universally believed to owe their elevation solely to their support for the Union, and his appointment was badly received by the legal profession. It was said of Daly that, while he had been a good student, and was reasonably well-read, he had never held even a dozen briefs in his whole career, and that barristers mocked his ignorance of the law in open court. He did at least come from a family with a tradition of judicial service: his great-grandfather, the first Denis Daly, had been a judge of the Court of Common Pleas (Ireland) during the reign of James II. He was also a man of blameless life, though retiring in disposition and generally unpopular. If no lawyer, he did have a reputation for common sense.

== Family ==
He lived at Eyrecourt in County Galway. In 1803 he married his cousin Louisa, daughter of Richard Gore of Sandymount, County Wicklow and Martha Fiott, but had no children. She died in 1816

Parliament of the United Kingdom
New constituency	Member of Parliament for Galway Borough; 1801	Succeeded by John Ponsonby
