= Robert Daly (bishop) =

Irish Church of Ireland bishop

Robert Daly (10 June 1783 – 16 February 1872) was Church of Ireland Bishop of Cashel and Waterford from 1843 to 1872.

== Life ==
Daly was born at Dunsandle Castle, Loughrea, the newly built residence of his father, Denis Daly. His ancestor, Dermot Ó Daly (fl. 1574–1614) was a Roman Catholic of Gaelic descent but his grandfather and father had converted to the Protestant faith to ensure legal title on their lands. By 1800, the family were among the largest landowners in Ireland and dictated the mayoralty of Galway for some sixty years. His mother was Lady Henrietta Maxwell, only daughter of Robert Maxwell, 1st Earl of Farnham and Henrietta Cantillon, widow of the 3rd Earl of Strafford.

Daly graduated with a B.A. from Trinity College, Dublin, in 1803, was ordained deacon and then priest of the Church of Ireland, and became Rector of Powerscourt in 1814. He was leader of the Evangelical section of the church, the subject at the centre of most of his publications, which numbered over twenty-two between 1815 and his death.

Daly was passionate in his support of anti-Catholic missions: his hatred of the Irish Catholic church, and especially its priests, endured to the end of his life, although he must have known that his own family had originally been Catholics. He was one of the founders in 1818 of the controversial Irish Society for Promoting the Education of the Native Irish through the Medium of Their Own Language.

Daly also supported the setting up of Church Education Society in 1839 countering the setting up of the National School system in Ireland.

He was appointed Dean of St. Patrick's Cathedral, Dublin in 1842; and Bishop of Cashel and Waterford in 1843 and was serving in that capacity when he died in 1872.

== Select bibliography ==
- A sermon preached on ... 25 May 1815, in the Catholic Church of St. Patrick ... at the annual visitation, held by ... the Archbishop of Cashel, Dublin, 1815.
- Letters on the Subject of the Scotch Episcopal Church ... to the Right Rev. Bishop Low, Aberdeen, 1846.
- Extract on the subject of liturgical revision from the charge delivered by the ... Bishop of Cashel, Waterford, 1863.

== See also ==
- Dermot Ó Daly (fl. 1574–1614)
- Denis Daly (M.P.), 1747–1792
- James Daly, 1st Baron Dunsandle and Clanconal
- Dominick Daly, 1798–1868
