= County Galway (Parliament of Ireland constituency) =

Pre-1801 Irish constituency

- Former county constituency for the Irish House of Commons
- County: County Galway

–1801
- Replaced by: County Galway (UKHC)

County Galway was a constituency represented in the Irish House of Commons until 1800.

== History ==
In the Patriot Parliament of 1689 summoned by James II, County Galway was represented with two members. Following the Acts of Union 1800 the county was represented by the Westminster constituency of County Galway.

== Members of Parliament ==
Year	First member	Second member
1585	Francis Shaen	Thomas Lestrange
1613–1615	John Moore of Brizes	Sir William Bourke
1634–1635	Sir Richard Blake	Sir Valentine Blake
1639–1645	Sir Ulick Bourke, 1st Baronet	Sir Richard Blake
1661–1666	Sir Oliver St George, 1st Baronet	Chidley Coote

=== 1689–1801 ===
Election	First MP	Second MP
1689	Sir Ulick Burke, 3rd Bt	Sir Walter Blake, 6th Bt
1692	John Eyre	Sir Oliver St George, 1st Bt
1703	John Eyre	John French
1709	Edward Ormsby	John French
1713	John Eyre	Patrick French
1715	Edward Ormsby	Frederick Trench
1727	John Eyre	Frederick Trench
1745	Hon. Thomas Bermingham	Frederick Trench
1750	George Warburton	Frederick Trench
1753	Charles Daly	Robert French
1761	Charles Daly	Richard Trench
August 1768	Lord Dunkellin (Note: Declared not duly elected in 1768Pa)	Denis Daly
1768	William Trench	Denis Daly
1790	William Trench	Joseph Blake
1798	Hon. Richard Trench	Joseph Blake
1800	Richard Martin	Joseph Blake
1801	Succeeded by the Westminster constituency County Galway	

== Bibliography ==
- O'Hart, John (2007). The Irish and Anglo-Irish Landed Gentry: When Cromwell came to Ireland. Vol. II. Heritage Books. ISBN 0-7884-1927-7.
- Johnston-Liik, E. M. (2002). History of the Irish Parliament, 1692–1800, Publisher: Ulster Historical Foundation (28 Feb 2002), ISBN 978-1-903688-09-0
- T. W. Moody, F. X. Martin, F. J. Byrne, A New History of Ireland 1534-1691, Oxford University Press, 1978
- Leigh Rayment's historical List of Members of the Irish House of Commons. Cites: Johnston-Liik, Edith Mary (2002). The History of the Irish Parliament 1692-1800 (6 volumes). Ulster Historical Foundation.
