= Richard II de Bermingham =

Richard II de Bermingham (died 1580) was an Anglo-Irish lord.

Richard had one of the longest terms as lord, but it was during these years that Athenry came to decline. The succession crisis of the second Earl of Clanricarde and the subsequent Mac an Iarla wars, devastate his lordship, to the point where he admitted to Sir Henry Sidney that though his was the oldest Anglo-Irish lordship in Connacht, he and his people were reduced to penury; he was "as poor a baron as liveth".

Two of the worst events were the 1572 Sack of Athenry and its destruction by Aodh mac Maghnusa Ó Domhnaill in 1577. While in the 1540s there were above three hundred prosperous houses in the town, there were by the 1570s less than forty, now of quality and many of their inhabitants ready to leave.

In response to the unrest, Richard permanently shifted the location of the lordship to Dunmore, at the northern extent of his rule. The family would be based in the area henceforth, though still owning land and property in Athenry and its environs.

Richard died in 1580, but was so insignificant that his death was not reported in the annals. He married Catherine O'Kelly, and had a son Edmond, 10th Baron.

Peerage of Ireland
Preceded by John de Bermingham	Baron Athenry; 1547–1580	Succeeded by Edmond I de Bermingham
