= Denis Bowes Daly =

Irish politician

Denis Bowes Daly PC (c. 1745 – 17 December 1821) was an Irish politician.

== Biography ==
Daly was the eldest son of Hyacynth Daly of Dalystown, and his cousin Rose Daly of Raford, both of County Galway and educated privately in Dublin and at Trinity College Dublin.

After serving as High Sheriff of King's County for 1774, he was brought into the Parliament of Ireland by his cousin, Denis Daly of Dunsandle. There he served as MP for Galway Town from 1776 to 1790 and for King's County from 1790 to 1800. A constant supporter of the Ponsonby's, he voted for catholic relief in 1778 and 1793, the implicit repeal of Poynings' Law in 1782, and for commercial propositions in 1785. He was an agent for Viceroy William Fitzwilliam, 4th Earl Fitzwilliam in attempting to persuade John Beresford to accept a pension, thus leaving office without scandal. Daly strongly opposed the Acts of Union 1800, co-ordinating the factions against the government.

After the acts were passed he represented King's County (1801–1802), Galway Borough (1802–1805) and County Galway (1805–1818). He was sworn of the Privy Council of Ireland on 7 June 1806.

In 1780, he married Mary Charlotte Ponsonby, daughter of John Ponsonby and Lady Elizabeth Cavendish, and sister of William Ponsonby, 1st Baron Ponsonby. However she died a year after the marriage, after which Daly refused to leave his house for more than twelve months.

Following Daly's death in 1821, the preserved body of his wife was found in a closet at Dalystown House, which Daly frequently visited. It was also reported that Daly wore the ashes of her heart in a locket.

Parliament of the United Kingdom
New constituency	Member of Parliament for King's County; 1801–1802; With: Sir Lawrence Parsons	Succeeded by Sir Lawrence Parsons; Thomas Bernard
Preceded by John Brabazon Ponsonby	Member of Parliament for Galway Borough; 1802–1805	Succeeded by James Daly
Preceded by Richard Martin; Richard Le Poer Trench	Member of Parliament for County Galway; 1805–1818; With: Richard Martin to 1812; James Daly from 1812	Succeeded by James Daly; Richard Martin
