= James Staunton Lambert =

Irish politician (1789–1867)

James Staunton Lambert (5 March 1789 – July 1867) was an Irish Whig politician who was Member of Parliament for County Galway from 1827 to 1832.

Lambert was a descendant of John Lambert of Creg Clare. Lambert died in Budleigh Salterton in Devon.

== See also ==
- List of MPs elected in the 1830 United Kingdom general election
- List of MPs elected in the 1831 United Kingdom general election
