= Gunpowder Act =

Gunpowder Act can refer to several acts of the parliaments of Great Britain or the United Kingdom, including:

- Keeping, etc., of Gunpowder Act 1771
- Gunpowder Act 1772
- Gunpowder Act 1860

== See also ==
- Explosives Act (disambiguation)
- Observance of 5th November Act 1605, enacted in response to the Gunpowder Plot
