= 1906 North Galway by-election =

UK parliamentary by-election

The 1906 North Galway by-election was held on 28 February 1906 after the MP elected in the general election in January 1906, Thomas Higgins, died before his election declaration at the 1906 general election.

== 1906 general election ==
Higgins, originally from Monivea, who was chairman of Tuam Board of Guardians and a member of Galway County Council, was selected as the Irish Parliamentary Party candidate by the United Irish League (UIL) convention on 5 January 1906 to contest the 1906 general election. He had been President of the constituency branch of the UIL since 1900.

Taken ill on the night of the election (25 January 1906), he died as the result of a heart attack in Guy's Hotel, Tuam, at 1.30am the following morning (26 January 1906).

As was widely expected, Higgins topped the poll at the election count, which was held later on the day of his death, beating the incumbent MP, John Philip Nolan, who had stood as an Independent Nationalist. Higgins, who received 2,685 votes (Nolan took 1,064), was posthumously declared elected by the county sheriff, the returning officer.

Higgins was elected posthumously, thereby creating an immediate vacancy.

== By-election ==
The 25-year-old Richard Hazleton, a Blackrock District councillor who had unsuccessfully contested South Dublin in the 1906 election, was selected as the Irish Parliamentary Party candidate, as the only candidate nominated for the resulting by-election, and was therefore elected unopposed when nominations closed on 28 February.

== Similar by-elections ==
The remarkable circumstances surrounding the election led the Irish Independent to comment that "candidates have died before the actual election, but we doubt if ever such a case as the present has occurred before, where a candidate has died after the poll has been taken and before the result has been declared".

This circumstance occurred again to Noel Skelton in 1935, and to Sir Edward Taswell Campbell and Leslie Pym in 1945; however, all of them were candidates for re-election. Thomas Higgins is the only MP to be newly elected posthumously.
