= 1872 County Galway by-election =

UK Parliamentary by-election

The 1872 County Galway by-election was held on 8 February 1872. The by-election was held due to the resignation of the incumbent MP of the Liberal Party, William Henry Gregory, as he became Governor of Ceylon. It was won by the Home Rule candidate John Philip Nolan but this was overturned on petition.

Nolan beat his opponent, William Le Poer Trench, the third son of the Earl of Clancarty, winning by a large majority. Of the 4,686 available electors, who were chiefly Catholic, 2,823 voted for Nolan and 658 for Le Poer Trench.

Le Poer Trench appealed the result, claiming on petition that there was widespread intimidation during the election campaign. The local Catholic bishops and clergy had strongly supported Nolan, chiefly because the Clancartys were active in proselytism.

The trial of the County Galway election petition was held before Judge William Keogh, a Catholic and former MP for the pro Home-Rule Independent Irish Party. The trial started on 1 April and ended on 21 May 1872. Keogh found that Nolan had been elected by the undue influence and intimidation.

In his report stated that he found 36 persons guilty of undue influence and intimidation, including the Archbishop John MacHale, the Archbishop of Tuam, the Bishop of Clonfert, Patrick Duggan, and the Bishop of Galway, John McEvilly, and twenty-nine named priests, the majority of Catholic parish priests in the constituency. They were held to have used all influence to overthrow all free will.

A special case decided that notices put up by Le Poer Trench alerting voters to Nolan's previous involvement in treating were sufficient to inform voters that he was disqualified.

The findings were that there was an undue election as there had been treating, undue influence and that the candidate was disqualified as he had previously been guilty of corrupt practices. As a result, Captain Nolan was unseated on 13 June, the seat going to Captain Le Poer Trench.

The judgement caused an uproar; the judge was threatened with removal from the bench and his reputation never recovered.

Nolan retook the seat at the 1874 election. He remained MP after the 1885 constituency reforms as MP for Galway North until 1895.

== Result ==
Election	Political result	Candidate	Party	Votes	%	±%
County Galway by-election, 1872; Resignation of William Henry Gregory; Turnout: 3,481 (74.29%)	Home Rule gain from Liberal; Majority: 2,165 (62.29%)	John Philip Nolan	Home Rule	2,823	81.19	N/A
County Galway by-election, 1872; Resignation of William Henry Gregory; Turnout: 3,481 (74.29%)	Home Rule gain from Liberal; Majority: 2,165 (62.29%)	William Le Poer Trench	Irish Conservative	658	18.90	New
