= Explosives Act =

Explosives Act and similar titles can refer to various pieces of legislation relating to explosives, including:

- Corrosive and Explosive Substances and Offensive Weapons Act 1958 in Malaysia
- Explosives Act 1875 in the United Kingdom
- Explosives Act 1957 in Malaysia
- Explosive Substances Act 1883 in the United Kingdom
- Federal Explosives Act of 1917 in the United States

== See also ==
- Fireworks Act 2003 in the United Kingdom
- Gunpowder Act (disambiguation)
