= 1914 North Galway by-election =

UK Parliamentary by-election

The 1914 North Galway by-election was held on 21 July 1914. The by-election was held due to the incumbent Irish Parliamentary MP, Richard Hazleton, who was seeking re-election after submitting his own bankruptcy petition. It was retained by Hazleton who was unopposed.
