= Keeping, etc., of Gunpowder Act 1771 =

Act of the Parliament of Great Britain

- Act of Parliament
- Parliament of Great Britain
- Long title: An Act for reducing into One Act of Parliament the several Laws relating to the Keeping and Carriage of Gunpowder, and for more effectually preventing Mischiefs by keeping or carrying Gunpowder in too great Quantities.
- Citation: 11 Geo. 3. c. 35
- Territorial extent: Great Britain

Dates
- Royal assent: 8 May 1771
- Commencement: 1 August 1771 (Note: Section 13.)
- Repealed: 1 July 1772
Other legislation
Amends	See § Repealed enactments
Repeals/revokes	See § Repealed enactments
Repealed by	Gunpowder Act 1772
Relates to	Gunpowder Act 1772; Gunpowder Act 1860; Explosives Act 1875

Status: Repealed

Text of statute as originally enacted

The Keeping, etc., of Gunpowder Act 1771 (11 Geo. 3. c. 35) was an act of the Parliament of Great Britain that consolidated all acts relating to the keeping and transport of gunpowder.

== Background ==
Over time, statutes regulating the keeping and transport of gunpowder had grown in volume, and no regulations were made for Scotland, resulting in the desire for consolidation of such acts for Great Britain.

== Provisions ==
Section 13 of the act repealed 5 enactments, effective from 1 August 1771.

Citation	Short title	Subject	Extent of repeal
5 Geo. 1. c. 26	Keeping of Gunpowder Act 1718	An act made in the fifth year of his late Act majesty King George the First, intituled, An act for preventing the mischiefs which may happen by keeping too great quantities of gunpowder in or near the cities of London and Westminster, or the Suburbs thereof.	The whole act.
11 Geo. 1. c. 23	Keeping of Gunpowder Act 1724	An act made in the eleventh year of his said late majesty King George the First, intituled, An all for making more effectual an act passed in the fifth year of his Majesty's reign, intituled, An act for preventing the mischiefs which may happen by keeping too great quantities of gunpowder in or near the cities of London and Westminster, or the suburbs thereof.	The whole act.
5 Geo. 2.	Pilotage Act 1731	An act made in the fifth year of his act late majesty King George the Second, intituled, An act for the better regulation and government of pilots licensed by the corporation of Trinity House of Deptford Stroud, in the county of Kent; and to prevent mischiefs and annoyances upon the river of Thames below London Bridge.	As relates to the having and searching for gunpowder on board ships or vessels in the Thames at or below Blackwall.
15 Geo. 2. c. 32	Keeping of Gunpowder Act 1741	An act made in the fifteenth year of his late majesty King George the Second, intituled, An act for preventing the mischiefs which may happen by keeping dangerous quantities of gunpowder in or near the cities of London and Westminster.	The whole act.
22 Geo. 2. c. 38	Keeping, etc., of Gunpowder Act 1748	An act made in the twenty-second year of his said late majesty King George the Second, intituled, An act to prevent the mischiefs which may happen by keeping too great quantities of gunpowder in any one place, or carrying too great quantities of gunpowder together from one place to another Legacy.	The whole act.

== Subsequent developments ==
The whole act was repealed by section 31 of the Gunpowder Act 1772 (12 Geo. 3. c. 61) in the following parliamentary session, which came into force on 1 July 1772. The act replaced all the provisions of the act with the addition of regulations relating to the making of gunpowder.

The Select Committee on Temporary Laws described that act as a Consolidation Act.
