= List of acts of the Parliament of Great Britain from 1771 =

This is a complete list of acts of the Parliament of Great Britain for the year 1771.

For acts passed until 1707, see the list of acts of the Parliament of England and the list of acts of the Parliament of Scotland. See also the list of acts of the Parliament of Ireland.

For acts passed from 1801 onwards, see the list of acts of the Parliament of the United Kingdom. For acts of the devolved parliaments and assemblies in the United Kingdom, see the list of acts of the Scottish Parliament, the list of acts of the Northern Ireland Assembly, and the list of acts and measures of Senedd Cymru; see also the list of acts of the Parliament of Northern Ireland.

The number shown after each act's title is its chapter number. Acts are cited using this number, preceded by the year(s) of the reign during which the relevant parliamentary session was held; thus the Union with Ireland Act 1800 is cited as "39 & 40 Geo. 3. c. 67", meaning the 67th act passed during the session that started in the 39th year of the reign of George III and which finished in the 40th year of that reign. Note that the modern convention is to use Arabic numerals in citations (thus "41 Geo. 3" rather than "41 Geo. III"). Acts of the last session of the Parliament of Great Britain and the first session of the Parliament of the United Kingdom are both cited as "41 Geo. 3".

Acts passed by the Parliament of Great Britain did not have a short title; however, some of these acts have subsequently been given a short title by acts of the Parliament of the United Kingdom (such as the Short Titles Act 1896).

Before the Acts of Parliament (Commencement) Act 1793 came into force on 8 April 1793, acts passed by the Parliament of Great Britain were deemed to have come into effect on the first day of the session in which they were passed. Because of this, the years given in the list below may in fact be the year before a particular act was passed.

== 11 Geo. 3 ==
The fourth session of the 13th Parliament of Great Britain, which met from 13 November 1770 until 8 May 1771.

This session was also traditionally cited as 11 G. 3.

=== Public acts ===
Short title	Citation	Royal assent
Long title
Exportation etc. Act 1771 (repealed)	11 Geo. 3. c. 1	29 November 1770
An Act to continue the Prohibition of the Exportation of Corn, Grain, Meal, Flour, Bread, Biscuit, and Starch; and also of the Extraction of Low Wines and Spirits from Wheat and Wheat Flour, for a further Time; and also to prohibit the Exportation of Malt, for a limited Time: (Repealed by Statute Law Revision Act 1871 (34 & 35 Vict. c. 116))
Malt Duties Act 1771 (repealed)	11 Geo. 3. c. 2	17 December 1770
An Act for continuing and granting to His Majesty certain Duties upon Malt, Mum, Cyder, and Perry, for the Service of the Year One thousand seven hundred and seventy-one. (Repealed by Statute Law Revision Act 1871 (34 & 35 Vict. c. 116))
Supply of Seamen Act 1771 (repealed)	11 Geo. 3. c. 3	17 December 1770
An Act for the better Supply of Mariners and, Seamen to serve in His Majesty's Ships of War, and on Board Merchant Ships and other Trading Ships and Vessels. (Repealed by Statute Law Revision Act 1871 (34 & 35 Vict. c. 116))
Crown Lands (Savoy) Act 1771 (repealed)	11 Geo. 3. c. 4	17 December 1770
An Act to amend so much of an Act made in the Ninth Year of His present Majesty's Reign, (Note: Crown Suits Act 1769 (9 Geo. 3. c. 16)) intituled, "An Act to amend and render more effectual an Act made in the Twenty-first Year of the Reign of King James the first, (Note: Crown Suits, etc. Act 1623 (21 Jas. 1. c. 2)) intituled, 'An Act for the general Quiet of the Subjects against all Pretences of Concealment whatsoever,'" as relates to the prosecuting His Majesty's Right, Title, or Claim to any Messages, Lands, Tenements, or Hereditaments within the Precinct, District, or Liberty of the Savoy in the County of Middlesex, or to any the Appurtenances to the same therein mentioned. (Repealed by Statute Law Revision Act 1871 (34 & 35 Vict. c. 116))
Land Tax Act 1771 (repealed)	11 Geo. 3. c. 5	21 December 1770
An Act for granting an Aid to His Majesty by a Land-Tax, to be raised in Great Britain, for the Service of the Year One thousand seven hundred and seventy-one. (Repealed by Statute Law Revision Act 1871 (34 & 35 Vict. c. 116))
Mutiny Act 1771 (repealed)	11 Geo. 3. c. 6	21 December 1770
An Act for punishing Mutiny and Desertion, and for the better Payment of the Army and their Quarters. (Repealed by Statute Law Revision Act 1871 (34 & 35 Vict. c. 116))
Marine Mutiny Act 1771 (repealed)	11 Geo. 3. c. 7	21 December 1770
An Act for the Regulation of His Majesty's Marine Forces while on Shore. (Repealed by Statute Law Revision Act 1871 (34 & 35 Vict. c. 116))
Importation Act 1771 (repealed)	11 Geo. 3. c. 8	21 December 1770
An Act to continue, For a further Time, an Act made in the Eighth Year of His Present Majesty's Reign, intituled, (Note: Importation Act 1768 (8 Geo. 3. c. 9)) "An Act to continue and amend an Act, made in the Fifth Year of the Reign of His Present Majesty, (Note: Importation Act 1765 (5 Geo. 3. c. 1)) intituled, 'An Act for Importation of Salted Beef, Pork, Bacon, and Butter, from Ireland, for a limited Time;' and for allowing the Importation of Salted Beef, Pork, Bacon, and Butter, from the British Dominions in America, for a limited Time." (Repealed by Statute Law Revision Act 1871 (34 & 35 Vict. c. 116))
Winchester Improvement Act 1771 (repealed)	11 Geo. 3. c. 9	21 December 1770
An Act for the better paving, repairing, cleansing, lighting, and watching the Streets and other publick Passages within the City of Winchester, and also within the several Parishes of Saint Bartholomew Hyde, Saint John's in the Soke, Saint Peter's Cheesehill, Saint Swithin, and Saint Michael in the West Soke; in the Suburbs of the said City, and for preventing Nuisances and Annoyances therein; and for widening and rendering the same more commodious. (Repealed by Winchester Improvement Act 1808 (48 Geo. 3. c. ii) and Local Government Supplemental Act 1866 (29 & 30 Vict. c. 24))
Morden College, Kent Act 1771 (repealed)	11 Geo. 3. c. 10	8 March 1771
An Act for carrying into Execution an Agreement made between Peter Burrell Esquire, Surveyor General of His Majesty's Lands, and the Trustees of Morden College in the County of Kent, for enabling His Majesty, His Heirs and Successors, to grant Leases of Maidenstone Hill, in the Parish of East Greenwich in the County of Kent, to the said Trustees, upon the Terms mentioned in the said Agreement; and for empowering the said Trustees to increase the Salaries and Pensions of the Treasurer, Chaplain, and Poor Merchants, in the said College. (Repealed by Statute Law (Repeals) Act 1978 (c. 45))
Mutiny in America Act 1771 (repealed)	11 Geo. 3. c. 11	8 March 1771
An Act for further continuing Two Acts made in the Sixth (Note: Mutiny in America Act 1766 (6 Geo. 3. c. 18)) and Ninth (Note: Mutiny in America Act 1769 (9 Geo. 3. c. 18)) Years of His Majesty's Reign, for punishing Mutiny and Desertion, and for the better Payment of the Army and their Quarters in His Majesty's Dominions in America. (Repealed by Statute Law Revision Act 1871 (34 & 35 Vict. c. 116))
Saint Mary, Whitechapel (Improvement) Act 1771 (repealed)	11 Geo. 3. c. 12	8 March 1771
An Act for better paying the Streets, Squares, Lanes, Courts, Alleys, Ways, and other public Passages in that Part of Goodman's Fields which lies in the Parish of Saint Mary Matfellon, otherwise Whitechapel, in the County of Middlesex; and also Red Lion Street and White Lion Street, lying contiguous to the said Fields; and for removing and preventing Nuisances, Annoyances, and Obstructions therein. (Repealed by Whitechapel Improvement Act 1853 (16 & 17 Vict. c. cxli))
Worcester (Water Supply, etc.) Act 1771 (repealed)	11 Geo. 3. c. 13	8 March 1771
An Act to explain a Clause in an Act of the last Session of Parliament, (Note: Worcester (Improvement) Act 1770 (10 Geo. 3. c. 22)) for better supplying the City of Worcester and the Liberties thereof with Water; and for better paving and lighting the said City; and for removing and preventing, all Obstructions, and Annoyances therein. (Repealed by Worcester Water Act 1823 (4 Geo. 4. c. lxix))
Oxford (Poor Relief) Act 1771 (repealed)	11 Geo. 3. c. 14	8 March 1771
An Act for the better regulating the Poor within the City of Oxford. (Repealed by Oxford Poor Act 1854 (17 & 18 Vict. c. ccxix))
Saint Mary, Whitechapel (Improvement) (No. 2) Act 1771 (repealed)	11 Geo. 3. c. 15	8 March 1771
An Act for the better paying that Part of the High Street in the Parish of Saint Mary Matfellon, otherwise Whitechapel, which lies in the County of Middlesex, and for removing Obstructions and Annoyances therein. (Repealed by Whitechapel Improvement Act 1853 (16 & 17 Vict. c. cxli))
Liverpool Theatre Act 1771 (repealed)	11 Geo. 3. c. 16	8 March 1771
An Act to enable His Majesty to license a Playhouse in the Town of Liverpoole in the County Palatine of Lancaster. (Repealed by Statute Law Revision Act 1948 (11 & 12 Geo. 6. c. 62))
Southwark Streets Act 1771 (repealed)	11 Geo. 3. c. 17	28 March 1771
An Act to explain and amend so much of an Act of the Sixth Year of His present Majesty, (Note: Southwark Improvement Act 1766 (6 Geo. 3. c. 24)) for paving the Town and Borough of Southwark, in the County of Surrey, as relates to the Commissioners of Sewers; and for regulating the Manner of taxing Churches and other public Buildings within the Limits of the said Act. (Repealed by Southwark Improvement Act 1845 (8 & 9 Vict. c. xiii) (Note: Incorrectly cited as "1845 c. cxiii" in the Chronological Table of the Statutes.), London Government (Borough of Bermondsey) Order in Council 1901 (SR&O 1901/264) and London Government (Borough of Southwark) Order in Council 1901 (SR&O 1901/275))
Indemnity Act 1771 (repealed)	11 Geo. 3. c. 18	28 March 1771
An Act to indemnify Persons who have omitted Bill to qualify themselves for Offices and Employments, and to indemnify Justices of the Peace and others who have omitted to register their Qualifications within the Time limited by Law; and for giving further Time for those Purposes. (Repealed by Promissory Oaths Act 1871 (34 & 35 Vict. c. 48))
Oxford Improvement Act 1771 or the Oxford Mileways Act 1771	11 Geo. 3. c. 19	28 March 1771
An Act for amending certain of the Mile Ways leading to Oxford; for making a commodious Entrance through the Parish of Saint Clement; for rebuilding or repairing Magdalen Bridge; for making commodious Roads from the said Bridge through the University and City, and the Avenues leading thereto; for cleansing and lighting the Streets, Lanes, and Places, within the said University and City, and the Suburbs thereof, and the said Parish of Saint Clement; for removing Nuisances and Annoyances therefrom, and preventing the like for the future; for empowering Colleges and Corporations to alienate their Estates there; for removing, holding, and regulating Markets within the said City, and for other Purposes.
Lunacy Act 1771 (repealed)	11 Geo. 3. c. 20	28 March 1771
An Act to enable Lunaticks entitled to renew Leases, their Guardians and Committees, to accept of Surrenders of Old Leases and grant New Ones. (Repealed by Infants' Property Act 1830 (11 Geo. 4. & 1 Will. 4. c. 65))
Saint John, Wapping (Improvement) Act 1771 (repealed)	11 Geo. 3. c. 21	28 March 1771
An Act for paving Wapping Street, in the County of Middlesex, and the several Streets and Passages leading into the same, and for removing all Encroachments and Obstructions there from, and preventing the like for the future; and for opening a Passage from Hermitage Street into Nightingale Lane, and for paving such Passage, and the Earl Side of Nightingale Lane. (Repealed by London Government (Borough of Stepney) Order in Council 1901 (SR&O 1901/276))
Westminster (Streets) Act 1771 (repealed)	11 Geo. 3. c. 22	28 March 1771
An Act to amend and render more effectual several Acts made relating to paving, cleansing, and lighting, the Squares, Streets, Lanes, and other Places, within the City and Liberty of Westminster and Parts adjacent. (Repealed by St. Pancras Improvement Act 1812 (52 Geo. 3. c. lxxiv), Tothill Fields Improvement Act 1825 (6 Geo. 4. c. cxxxiv), United Parishes of St. Andrew Holborn above the Bars and St. George the Martyr Improvement Act 1832 (2 & 3 Will. 4. c. lxvi), London Government (Borough of Holborn) Order in Council 1901 (SR&O 1901/269) and London Government (City of Westminster) Order in Council 1901 (SR&O 1901/278))
Saint Botolph, Aldgate (Streets) Act 1771	11 Geo. 3. c. 23	28 March 1771
An Act for paving and regulating Rosemary Lane, from the Parish of Saint Botolph Aldgate, to Cable Street; also the said Cable Street, the Foot Path in Back Lane, Part of the Precinct of Wellclose, the Street leading from Nightingale Lane to Ratcliffe Cross, Butcher Row, and Brook Street, and the several Streets, Lanes, and Passages, opening into the same; and for removing all Obstructions and Annoyances therefrom, and preventing the like for the future.
Hackney Coaches Act 1771 (repealed)	11 Geo. 3. c. 24	12 April 1771
An Act for licensing an additional Number of Hackney Coaches, and applying the Monies arising thereby. (Repealed by London Hackney Carriage Act 1831 (1 & 2 Will. 4. c. 22))
Loans or Exchequer Bills Act 1771 (repealed)	11 Geo. 3. c. 25	12 April 1771
An Act for raising a certain Sum of Money by Loans or Exchequer Bills, for the Service of the Year One thousand seven hundred and seventy-one. (Repealed by Statute Law Revision Act 1871 (34 & 35 Vict. c. 116))
London Bridge Act 1771	11 Geo. 3. c. 26	12 April 1771
An Act for further continuing the Tolls upon London Bridge, for the Purposes therein mentioned, and for empowering the Mayor, Aldermen, and Commons, of the City of London, in Common Council assembled, in certain Cases, to grant Licences to Persons possessed of Terms for Years of and in Houses described in an Act of the Seventh Year of His present Majesty, (Note: Thames Embankment Act 1766 (7 Geo. 3. c. 37)) to build upon and enclose Part of the Ground and Soil of the Streets in the Front of their said Houses.
Tweed Fisheries Act 1771 (repealed)	11 Geo. 3. c. 27	12 April 1771
An Act for regulating and improving the Fisheries in the River Tweed, and the Rivers and Streams running into the same; and also within the Mouth or Entrance of the said River. (Repealed by River Tweed Fisheries Act 1830 (11 Geo. 4. & 1 Will. 4. c. liv))
Hackney Coachmen Act 1771 (repealed)	11 Geo. 3. c. 28	29 April 1771
An Act for punishing Offences committed by Hackney Coachmen and Chairmen, within certain Districts and Places therein mentioned, and for renewing the Registry of Carts and Carriages. (Repealed by London Hackney Carriage Act 1831 (1 & 2 Will. 4. c. 22))
City of London Sewerage Act 1771 (repealed)	11 Geo. 3. c. 29	29 April 1771
An Act for consolidating, extending, and rendering more effectual, the Powers granted by several Acts of Parliament for making, enlarging, amending, and cleansing, the Vaults, Drains, and Sewers, within the City of London and Liberties thereof, and for paving, cleansing, and lighting, the Streets, Lanes, Squares, Yards, Courts, Alleys, Passages, and Places, and preventing and removing Obstructions and Annoyances within the same. (Repealed by City of London Sewers Act 1848 (11 & 12 Vict. c. clxiii) and City of London Sewers Act 1851 (14 & 15 Vict. c. xci))
South Leith (Improvement) Act 1771 (repealed)	11 Geo. 3. c. 30	29 April 1771
An Act for cleansing and lighting the Streets of the Town of South Leith, the Territory of Saint Anthony’s, and Yard Heads thereunto adjoining, and for supplying the several Parts thereof with Fresh Water. (Repealed by Leith Municipal Government Act 1827 (7 & 8 Geo. 4. c. cxii))
White Herring Fisheries Act 1771 (repealed)	11 Geo. 3. c. 31	29 April 1771
An Act for the Encouragement of the White Herring Fishery. (Repealed by Sea Fisheries Act 1868 (31 & 32 Vict. c. 45), Statute Law Revision Act 1888 (51 & 52 Vict. c. 3), Statute Law (Repeals) Act 1993 (c. 50) and Marine and Coastal Access Act 2009 (c. 23))
Militia Act 1771 (repealed)	11 Geo. 3. c. 32	29 April 1771
An Act for defraying the Charge of the Pay and Cloathing of the Militia, in that Part of Great Britain called England, for One Year, beginning the Twenty-fifth Day of March One thousand seven hundred and seventy-one; for indemnifying the Land-holders of the Isle of Wight from the Payment of the Monies due by virtue of an Act of the Ninth Year of His present Majesty, (Note: Militia Pay Act 1769 (9 Geo. 3. c. 40)) and for other Purposes therein mentioned. (Repealed by Statute Law Revision Act 1861 (24 & 25 Vict. c. 101))
Clerkenwell (Watching, etc.) Act 1771	11 Geo. 3. c. 33	29 April 1771
An Act for paving, repairing, cleansing, lighting, and watching, the Streets, Squares, Lanes, and other Passages, within the Parish of St. John Clerkenwell, in the County of Middlesex; and for removing Obstructions and Annoyances therein.
London (Thames Embankment) Act 1771	11 Geo. 3. c. 34	8 May 1771
An Act for enabling certain Persons to enclose and embank Part of the River Thames adjoining to Durham Yard, (Note: Durham Yard was named as it was previously the location of Durham House, the London residence of the Bishops of Durham. The Adelphi Buildings were later built on the site. 51°30′36″N 0°07′21″W) Salisbury Street, (Note: Salisbury Street was located between the Strand and the River Thames, on a site now occupied by Eighty Strand. 51°30′35″N 0°07′18″W) Cecil Street, (Note: Cecil Street was located between the Strand and the River Thames, on a site now occupied by Eighty Strand. 51°30′35″N 0°07′16″W) and Beaufort Buildings, (Note: Beaufort Buildings was located near to the site now occupied by the Savoy Theatre. 51°30′37″N 0°07′15″W) in the County of Middlesex.
Keeping, etc., of Gunpowder Act 1771 (repealed)	11 Geo. 3. c. 35	8 May 1771
An Act for reducing into One Act of Parliament the several Laws relating to the Keeping and Carriage of Gunpowder, and for more effectually preventing Mischiefs by keeping or carrying Gunpowder in too great Quantities. (Repealed by the Gunpowder Act 1772 (12 Geo. 3. c. 61))
Edinburgh (Streets) Act 1771 (repealed)	11 Geo. 3. c. 36	8 May 1771
An Act for cleansing, lighting, and watching, the several Streets and other Passages on the South Side of the City of Edinburgh, and for removing Nuisances and Annoyances therefrom, and preventing the same for the future. (Repealed by Edinburgh Police Act 1848 (11 & 12 Vict. c. cxiii))
Exportation Act 1771 (repealed)	11 Geo. 3. c. 37	8 May 1771
An Act to prohibit the Exportation of Live Cattle and other Flesh Provisions from Great Britain, for a limited Time. (Repealed by Statute Law Revision Act 1871 (34 & 35 Vict. c. 116))
Greenland and Whale Fishery Act 1771 (repealed)	11 Geo. 3. c. 38	8 May 1771
An Act for the better Support and Establishment of the Greenland and Whale Fishery. (Repealed by Statute Law Revision Act 1861 (24 & 25 Vict. c. 101))
Exportation (No. 2) Act 1771 (repealed)	11 Geo. 3. c. 39	8 May 1771
An Act to amend an Act, made in the last Session of Parliament, intituled, "An Act for extending like Liberty in the Exportation of Rice from East and West Florida, to the Southward of Cape Finesterre in Europe, as granted by former Acts of Parliament to Carolina and Georgia." (Note: Exportation (No. 3) Act 1770 (10 Geo. 3. c. 31)) (Repealed by Statute Law Revision Act 1871 (34 & 35 Vict. c. 116))
Counterfeiting of Copper Coin Act 1771 (repealed)	11 Geo. 3. c. 40	8 May 1771
An Act for the more effectually preventing the counterfeiting the Copper Coin of this Realm. (Repealed by Coinage Offences Act 1832 (2 & 3 Will. 4. c. 34))
Importation (No. 2) Act 1771 (repealed)	11 Geo. 3. c. 41	8 May 1771
An Act to explain an Act, made in the Eighth Year of the Reign of His late Majesty King George the First, intituled, "An Act giving further Encouragement for the Importation of Naval Stores, and for other Purposes therein mentioned," (Note: Importation Act 1721 (8 Geo. 1. c. 12)) so far as relates to the Importation of unmanufactured Wood of the Growth and Product of America; and to explain so much of an Act, made in the Twenty-sixth Year of the Reign of His late Majesty King George the Second, intituled, "An Act for enlarging and regulating the Trade into the Levant Seas," (Note: Levant Trade Act 1753 (26 Geo. 2. c. 18)) as relates to the Importation of Raw Silk and Mohair Yarn, landed at certain Places therein mentioned. (Repealed by Customs Law Repeal Act 1825 (6 Geo. 4. c. 105))
Parliamentary Elections Act 1771 (repealed)	11 Geo. 3. c. 42	8 May 1771
An Act to explain and amend an Act made in the last Session of Parliament, intituled, "An Act to regulate the Trials of controverted Elections or Returns of Members to serve in Parliament." (Note: Parliamentary Elections Act 1770 (10 Geo. 3. c. 16)) (Repealed by Controverted Elections Act 1828 (9 Geo. 4. c. 22))
Isle of Wight (Poor Relief) Act 1771 (repealed)	11 Geo. 3. c. 43	8 May 1771
An Act for establishing a House or Houses of Industry in the Isle of Wight, for the Reception, Maintenance, and Employment, of the Poor, belonging to the several Parishes and Places within the said Island. (Repealed by Isle of Wight Guardians Act 1776 (16 Geo. 3. c. 53))
Wakefield Improvement Act 1771 (repealed)	11 Geo. 3. c. 44	8 May 1771
An Act for the better paving, repairing, and cleansing, the Streets, Lanes, Alleys, and other Publick Passages within that Part of the Town of Wakefield, in the County of York, which lies within the East End of Westgate Bridge, the South Side of Northgate Bar, the North End of Kirkgate Bridge, (except so much thereof as is repaired by the West Riding of the said County of York), and the extreme Part of the Township of Wakefield aforesaid leading from Wrengate towards East Moor; for preventing Nuisances and Annoyances therein; and for widening and rendering the same more commodious. (Repealed by Public Health Supplemental Act 1853 (No. 1) (16 & 17 Vict. c. 24))
Thames and Isis Navigation Act 1771 (repealed)	11 Geo. 3. c. 45	29 April 1771
An Act for improving and completing the Navigation of the Rivers Thames and Isis, from the City of London to the Town of Cricklade, in the County of Wilts. (Repealed by Thames Conservancy Act 1894 (57 & 58 Vict. c. clxxxvii))
Saint Luke, Old Street (Improvement) Act 1771 (repealed)	11 Geo. 3. c. 46	8 May 1771
An Act for paving and keeping in Repair the Streets, Lanes, and Passages, in the Parish of St. Luke, in the County of Middlesex; for removing Obstructions and Annoyances therein; and for widening the Passages at the West End of Chiswell Street, and at the South End of Bricklane, in the said Parish, and for other Purposes therein mentioned. (Repealed by St. Luke's Parish, Middlesex, Improvement Act 1810 (50 Geo. 3. c. cxlix))
Lottery Act 1771 (repealed)	11 Geo. 3. c. 47	8 May 1771
An Act for granting to His Majesty a certain Sum of Money, to be raised by a Lottery. (Repealed by Statute Law Revision Act 1871 (34 & 35 Vict. c. 116))
Supply, etc. Act 1771 (repealed)	11 Geo. 3. c. 48	8 May 1771
An Act for granting to His Majesty a certain Sum of Money out of the Sinking Fund, and for applying certain Monies therein mentioned for the Service of the Year One thousand seven hundred and seventy-one; and for further appropriating the Supplies, granted in this Session of Parliament, for carrying to the Aggregate Fund a Sum of Money which hath arisen by the Two-sevenths Excise; and for enabling the Commissioners for executing the Office of Treasurer of His Majesty's Exchequer, or the Lord High Treasurer for the Time being, to pay to John Dobson, Owner of the Greenland Ship Lord Molyneux, the Bounty due for the said Ship on the last Year's Fishery. (Repealed by Statute Law Revision Act 1871 (34 & 35 Vict. c. 116))
Importation (No. 3) Act 1771 (repealed)	11 Geo. 3. c. 49	8 May 1771
An Act to continue for a further Time an Act, passed in the Sixth Year of His present Majesty’s Reign, intituled, "An Act to prohibit the Importation of Foreign Wrought Silks and Velvets for a limited Time; and for preventing unlawful Combinations of Workmen employed in the Silk Manufacture." (Note: Importation, etc. Act 1766 (6 Geo. 3. c. 28)) (Repealed by Statute Law Revision Act 1871 (34 & 35 Vict. c. 116))
Importation (No. 4) Act 1771 (repealed)	11 Geo. 3. c. 50	8 May 1771
An Act for granting a Bounty upon the Importation of White Oak Staves and Heading from the British Colonies or Plantations in America. (Repealed by Statute Law Revision Act 1871 (34 & 35 Vict. c. 116))
Continuance of Certain Laws, etc. Act 1771 (repealed)	11 Geo. 3. c. 51	8 May 1771
An Act for continuing several Laws for the better Regulation of Lastage and Balastage in the River Thames; for the further Punishment of Persons going armed or disguised, in Desiance of the Laws of Customs or Excise; and for the landing of Rum or Spirits of the British Sugar Plantations before Payment of the Duties of Excise; for repealing so much of an Act, passed in the Sixth Year of the Reign of King George the First, intituled, "An Act for preventing the Carriage of excessive Loads of Meal, Malt, Bricks, and Coals, within Ten Miles of the Cities of London and Westminster," (Note: Excessive Loading of Vehicles, London and Westminster Act 1719 (6 Geo. 1. c. 6)) as relates to the Carriage of Meal, Malt, and Coals; and for authorizing the Exportation of a limited Quantity of an inferior Sort of Barley, called Bigg, from the Port of Kirkwall, in the Islands of Orkney. (Repealed by Statute Law Revision Act 1871 (34 & 35 Vict. c. 116))
Isle of Man Harbours Act 1771 (repealed)	11 Geo. 3. c. 52	8 May 1771
An Act for repairing, amending, and supporting, the several Harbours and Sea Ports in the Isle of Man. (Repealed by Isle of Man Harbours Act 1814 (54 Geo. 3. c. 143) and Isle of Man Harbours Act 1872 (35 & 36 Vict. c. 23))
Highway (Scotland) Act 1771 (repealed)	11 Geo. 3. c. 53	8 May 1771
An Act for widening the Highways in that Part of Great Britain called Scotland. (Repealed by Road Traffic Act 1930 (20 & 21 Geo. 5. c. 43))
London (Streets) Act 1771 (repealed)	11 Geo. 3. c. 54	8 May 1771
An Act for the better paying, cleansing, lighting, and watching, Haydon Square, (Note: The former Haydon Square, between the Minories and Mansell Street. Now built over. 51°30′44″N 0°04′27″W) the New Square, (Note: New Square is now incorporated into Vine Street. 51°30′43″N 0°04′34″W) Haydon-Yard, (Note: The remaining part of Haydon Yard is now Haydon Street. 51°30′43″N 0°04′29″W) Sheepy-Yard, (Note: The former Sheppy Yard, off the Minories. Now built over. 51°30′44″N 0°04′30″W) Church Street, (Note: Church Street, off the Minories, now renamed to St. Claire Street. 51°30′45″N 0°04′31″W) Little Church Street otherwise the Church Passage, Church Court, and Kenton Street, and the Passages therein or leading thereunto, in the Parish of Trinity, otherwise Holy Trinity, in the Minories, in the County of Middlesex within the Liberty of His Majesty’s Tower of London; and for other Purposes therein mentioned. (Repealed by London Government (Borough of Stepney) Order in Council 1901 (SR&O 1901/276))
Parliamentary Elections, New Shoreham Act 1771 (repealed)	11 Geo. 3. c. 55	8 May 1771
An Act to incapacitate John Burnett, Charles Hannington, Thomas Haselgrove, Ralph Moor, Thomas Parsons, Thomas Snook Junior, Thomas Hannington, John Hannington, John Robinson, William Cheeseman, George Browne, John Parsons, John Curl, Frederick Bean, William Bean, Samuel Tuppen, John Sawyers, Thomas Crowter, Thomas Pockney, Joseph Dedman, John Dean, John Whning, William Stevens. John Bawcomb, Robert Parker, John Hogsflesh, John Purse, John Dean, Thomas Jennings, John Snook Junior, Richard Tilstone, William Turner, Walter Sawyers, Charles Mitchell, John Jarmand, John Wood, Friend Baniel, William Gratwick, Nathaniel Hillman, Thomas Roberts, John Ashman, William Cooter, Thomas Frost, Michael Smith, Richard Carver, Michael Burrant, Emery Churcher, Walter Broad, Richard Stoneham, James Bennett, Clement Freeman, William Jupp, Thomas Crowter, John Barnard, James Mitchell, James Millar otherwise Miller, William Newnham, Jeffery Carver, Randall Button, James Carver, John Martin, John Dedman Senior, William Jennings, William Hards, Thomas Gear, William Rusbridge, Henry Robinson, and Henry Hannington, from voting at Elections of Members to serve in Parliament, and for the preventing Bribery and Corruption in the Election of Members to serve in Parliament, for the Borough of New Shoreham, in the County of Sussex. (Repealed by Ballot Act 1872 (35 & 36 Vict. c. 33)
Crown Lands in Meath to Vest in Gerald Fitzgerald Act 1771 (repealed)	11 Geo. 3. c. 56	8 May 1771
An Act for diverting out of the Crown, and to vest in Gerard Fitzgerald of Rathrone, in the County of Meath, in the Kingdom of Ireland, Esquire and his Heirs, the Reversion in Fee of and in several Lands in Ireland, therein mentioned. (Repealed by Statute Law (Repeals) Act 1978 (c. 45))
Hertford Roads Act 1771 (repealed)	11 Geo. 3. c. 57	17 December 1770
An Act to continue and render, more effectual an Act passed in the Ninth Year of His present Majesty, (Note: Hertford and Cambridge Roads Act 1769 (9 Geo. 3. c. 86)) for repairing the Roads leading from the Turnpike Road in Tring, in the County of Hertford, through Dunstable, Hitchin, Baldock, and Royston, to the Turnpike Road at or near Bournbridge, and from the West End of Wellbury Lane, to the Turnpike Road at the south End of Barton, in the Counties of Hertford, Bucks, Bedford, and Cambridge, so far as the same relates to the repairing the Roads in the Royston District of Roads in the said Act particularly mentioned. (Repealed by Baldock and Bourn Bridge Road Act 1833 (3 & 4 Will. 4. c. lx))
Sudbury to Bury St. Edmunds Road Act 1771 (repealed)	11 Geo. 3. c. 58	17 December 1770
An Act for enlarging the Term and Powers of an Act made in the Second Year of the Reign of His present Majesty, intituled, "An Act for repairing and widening the High Road leading from the North End of Ballingdon Bridge in Sudbury in the bounty of Suffolk, to the South Gate in Bury Saint Edmunds's in the said County." (Note: Sudbury to Bury St. Edmunds Road Act 1762 (2 Geo. 3. c. 75)) (Repealed by Sudbury and Bury St. Edmunds Road Act 1826 (7 Geo. 4. c. cxxxi))
Kentish Town (Footpath) Act 1771	11 Geo. 3. c. 59	21 December 1770
An Act to impower Charles Fitz Roy Esquire to shut up certain Foot-paths in the Parish of Saint Pancras, alias Kentish Town, in the County of Middlesex, and to oblige him to make and keep in Repair for the future a Foot-path in lieu thereof.
Selkirk Roads Act 1771 (repealed)	11 Geo. 3. c. 60	8 March 1771
An Act for enlarging the Term and Powers of an Act, made in the Eighth Year of the Reign of His present Majesty, intituled, "An Act for repairing several Roads leading through the County of Selkirk." (Note: Selkirk Roads Act 1768 (8 Geo. 3. c. 59)) (Repealed by Selkirk Roads Act 1807 (47 Geo. 3 Sess. 1. c. xxiii))
Spernal Ash to Birmingham Road Act 1771 (repealed)	11 Geo. 3. c. 61	8 March 1771
An Act for enlarging the Term and Powers of an Act made in the Seventh Year of the Reign of His present Majesty, (Note: Warwick Roads Act 1766 (7 Geo. 3. c. 77)) for repairing and widening the Road from Spernal Ash in the County of Warwick, to a Street called Digbeth in the Town of Birmingham. (Repealed by Spernal Ash and Birmingham Road Act 1828 (9 Geo. 4. c. xxxiv))
Forth and Clyde Navigation Act 1771 (repealed)	11 Geo. 3. c. 62	8 March 1771
An Act to explain, amend, and render more effectual an Act made in the Eighth Year of His present Majesty's Reign, intituled, "An Act for making and maintaining a Navigable Cut or Canal from the Firth or River of Forth, at or near the Mouth of the River of Carron in the County of Stirling, to the Firth or River of Clyde, at or near a Place called Dalmuir Burnfoot in the County of Dumbarton; and also a collateral Cut from the same to the City of Glasgow; and for making a Navigable Cut or Canal of Communication, from the Port and Harbour of Borrowstounness, to join the said Canal at or near the Place where it will fall into the Firth of Forth." (Note: Forth and Clyde Navigation Act 1768 (8 Geo. 3. c. 63)) (Repealed by Forth and Clyde Navigation Act 1841 (4 & 5 Vict. c. lv))
Middleton and Bowes Road Act 1771 (repealed)	11 Geo. 3. c. 63	8 March 1771
An Act to continue and render more effectual an Act made in the Seventeenth Year of the Reign of His late Majesty, (Note: Middleton and Bowes Road Act 1743 (17 Geo. 2. c. 22)) for repairing the Road from the End of Middleton Tyas Lane to Greetabridge, and from thence to Bowes, in the North Riding of the County of York. (Repealed by Middleton and Bowes Road Act 1814 (54 Geo. 3. c. xxxi) and Annual Turnpike Acts Continuance Act 1875 (38 & 39 Vict. c. cxciv))
Tadcaster and Otley Road Act 1771 (repealed)	11 Geo. 3. c. 64	8 March 1771
An Act to enlarge the Term and Powers of an Act made in the Twenty-sixth Year of His late Majesty, (Note: Tadcaster and Otley Road Act 1753 (26 Geo. 2. c. 64)) for repairing and widening the Road from the Town of Tadcaster through Collingham, Harewood, Arthington, and Pool, to the Town of Otley in the West Riding of the County of York. (Repealed by Tadcaster and Otley Road Act 1842 (5 & 6 Vict. c. xciii))
Knaresborough and Green Hammerton Road Act 1771 (repealed)	11 Geo. 3. c. 65	8 March 1771
An Act to enlarge the Term and Powers of an Act made in the Twenty-fifth Year of his late Majesty, (Note: Yorkshire Roads (No. 2) Act 1751 (25 Geo. 2. c. 53)) for repairing the Road from Knaresbrough in the County of York, by Longflatt Lane, Gouldsbrough Fields, (Note: Gouldsborough Fields, off the A59 east of Knaresborough. 54°00′33″N 1°24′41″W) Flaxby, (Note: Flaxby, Yorkshire. 54°00′56″N 1°23′51″W) Allerton Mauleverer, (Note: Allerton Mauleverer, Yorkshire.) and Scate Moor, (Note: Scate Moor, off the A59, west of Green Hammerton.54°00′10″N 1°19′39″W) to Greenhamerton, (Note: Green Hammerton, Yorkshire. 54°00′20″N 1°18′06″W) in the same County, and for making the same a High Carriage Road. (Repealed by Knaresborough and Green Hammerton Turnpike Road Act 1856 (19 & 20 Vict. c. xlix))
York and Boroughbridge Road Act 1771 (repealed)	11 Geo. 3. c. 66	8 March 1771
An Act to enlarge the Term and Powers of an Act made in the Twenty-third Year of the Reign of His late Majesty, (Note: York and Boroughbridge Road Act 1749 (23 Geo. 2. c. 38)) for repairing the Road from the City of York over Skipbridge, to Boroughbridge, in the County of York. (Repealed by York and Boroughbridge Road Act 1818 (58 Geo. 3. c. ii) and Annual Turnpike Acts Continuance Act 1870 (33 & 34 Vict. c. 73))
Birmingham Canal Navigation Act 1771 (repealed)	11 Geo. 3. c. 67	8 March 1771
An Act to oblige the Company of Proprietors of the Birmingham Canal Navigation, to complete the said Canal to a Field called Newhall Ring, adjoining to the Town of Birmingham in the County of Warwick, within a limited Time, and to maintain and keep the same free and open for the Passage of Boats, Barges, and other Vessels. (Repealed by Birmingham Canal Navigations Act 1835 (5 & 6 Will. 4. c. xxxiv))
Collingham to York Road Act 1771 (repealed)	11 Geo. 3. c. 68	28 March 1771
An Act for repairing and widening the Road from Collingham; through Wetherby, to the City of York. (Repealed by Road from Collingham to York Act 1826 (7 Geo. 4. c. xi))
Flint Roads Act 1771 (repealed)	11 Geo. 3. c. 69	28 March 1771
An Act for enlarging the Term and Powers granted by an Act of the Ninth Year of His present Majesty's Reign, (Note: Flint Roads Act 1769 (9 Geo. 3. c. 45)) for repairing the Road from the Turnpike Gate in the Township of Greenfield, to the North Limits of the Township of Mostyn, and from Mostyn to Henllan, and from Llanerch y Mor to Pen y Waen, in the Counties of Flint and Denbigh; and for extending the said Act to several other Roads in the said Counties and the County of Carnarvon; and for taking several Roads within the said Counties out of the Power of the Trustees appointed by Two several Acts of Parliament of the Twenty-ninth (Note: Shrewsbury and Wrexham Road Act 1756 (29 Geo. 2. c. 93)) and Thirtieth (Note: Denbigh and Carnarvon Roads Act 1757 (30 Geo. 2. c. 69)) Years of His late Majesty, and for putting the said Roads under the Direction of the Trustees appointed by the said former and this present Act. (Repealed by Flint, Holywell and Mostyn Districts of Road Act 1833 (3 & 4 Will. 4. c. xxv) and Road from Pant Evan Brook to Abergele Act 1833 (3 & 4 Will. 4. c. xxvi))
Berkshire Roads Act 1771 (repealed)	11 Geo. 3. c. 70	28 March 1771
An Act to continue and render more effectual several Acts for repairing the Highways between the Bear Inn (Note: The Black Bear Inn stood at the corner of Castle Street and Bridge Street in Reading. 51°27′13″N 0°58′26″W) in Reading, and Puntfield, (Note: Puntfield was located near the Spring Inn, on the A4 at the junction with Sulhamstead Hill, west of Theale. 51°25′21″N 1°06′20″W) in the County of Berks, and other Roads in the said Acts mentioned; and for repairing several other Roads in this Act mentioned. (Repealed by Speenhamland and Puntfield Road Act 1815 (55 Geo. 3. c. xcv), Ruscombe, Reading and Beenham Road Act 1826 (7 Geo. 4. c. lxxiii) and Annual Turnpike Acts Continuance Act 1876 (39 & 40 Vict. c. 39))
Yorkshire Roads (No. 3) Act 1771 (repealed)	11 Geo. 3. c. 71	28 March 1771
An Act for repairing and widening the Road from the Low Water Mark of the River Humber, at or near Brough Ferry, in the Parish of Elloughton, in the East Riding of the County of York to the North End of the Town of Brough, (Note: Brough, Yorkshire.) and from thence, through South Cave, (Note: South Cave, Yorkshire.) to Coney Clappers, in South Newbald Holmes, (Note: South Newbald, Yorkshire.) in the said Riding. (Repealed by Road from Brough Ferry and from Brough to Welton Act 1832 (2 & 3 Will. 4. c. xv))
Denver, etc. Drainage, Norfolk Act 1771 (repealed)	11 Geo. 3. c. 72 (Note: Given royal assent using the form of words for a private act.)	28 March 1771
An Act for draining and preserving certain Fen Lands and Low Grounds in the Parishes of Stoke Ferry, Northwold, Wretton, Wereham, West Dereham, and Roxham, in the County of Norfolk. (Repealed by Norfolk Fen Drainage Act 1814 (54 Geo. 3. c. clxxvii))
Oxford Roads Act 1771 (repealed)	11 Geo. 3. c. 73	28 March 1771
An Act for amending, widening, turning, and altering, the Road from the Bottom of Galley Hill, near the Town of Witney, to the Cross in Clanfield, in the County of Oxford. (Repealed by Witney and Clanfield Road Act 1815 (55 Geo. 3. c. xxxviii), Annual Turnpike Acts Continuance Act 1874 (37 & 38 Vict. c. 95) and Statute Law (Repeals) Act 2013 (c. 2))
Birmingham to Stratford Road Act 1771 (repealed)	11 Geo. 3. c. 74	28 March 1771
An Act to continue and render more effectual Three Acts, made in the Twelfth Year of King George the First, (Note: Birmingham to Edgehill Road Act 1725 (12 Geo. 1. c. 6)) and in the Eighteenth (Note: Birmingham to Edgehill Road Act 1744 (18 Geo. 2. c. 32)) and Thirty-first (Note: Birmingham to Edgehill Road Act 1757 (31 Geo. 2. c. 58)) Years of His late Majesty, for repairing the Roads from Birmingham, through Warwick, to Warmington; and from Birmingham, through Stratford upon Avon, to Edgehill, in the County of Warwick, so far as the same relate to the Road from Birmingham through Stratford upon Avon, to Stratford Bridge, in the said County. (Repealed by Birmingham and Stratford-upon-Avon Road Act 1821 (1 & 2 Geo. 4. c. lxxxi))
Chesterfield to Stockwith (Trent) Canal Act 1771	11 Geo. 3. c. 75	28 March 1771
An Act for making a navigable Cut or Canal from Chesterfield, in the County of Derby, through or near Worksop and Retford, to join the River Trent at or near Stockwith, in the County of Nottingham.
Yorkshire and Derby Roads Act 1771	11 Geo. 3. c. 76	28 March 1771
An Act for repairing and widening the Road leading from Penistone Bridge, in the County of York, to Grindleford Bridge, in the County of Derby; and the Roads severally leading from Bamford Woodgate, over Yorkshire Bridge, to the Guide Post on Thornhill Moor, to or near the Eighth Mile Stone on Hathersage Moor, and to the Village of Darwent, in the said County of Derby.
Glamorgan Roads Act 1771 (repealed)	11 Geo. 3. c. 77	28 March 1771
An Act for repairing and widening several Roads leading to the Town of Lantrissent; and also the Road leading from Newbridge to a Place called The Old Furnace, all in the County of Glamorgan. (Repealed by Merthyr Tydfil Road Act 1812 (52 Geo. 3. c. cxxxix) and South Wales Turnpike Trusts Act 1844 (7 & 8 Vict. c. 91))
Bedford Level Drainage Act 1771	11 Geo. 3. c. 78	28 March 1771
An Act to enable the Corporation of the Governor, Bailiffs, and Commonalty, of the Company of Conservators of the Great Level of the Fens, called Bedford Level, to complete and maintain the principal Banks and Works necessary to the well draining and preserving the North Level, Part of the said Great Level, and for laying Taxes upon the Lands within the said North Level, and on divers Lands adjoining thereto in the Manor of Crowland.
Linlithgow Roads Act 1771 (repealed)	11 Geo. 3. c. 79	28 March 1771
An Act to enlarge the Term and Powers of so much of an Act, made in the Twenty-fourth Year of the Reign of King George the Second, (Note: Edinburgh and Leith Road Act 1750 (24 Geo. 2. c. 35)) as relates to the repairing the Road from Cramond Bridge, to the Town of Queensferry, in the County of Linlithgow. (Repealed by Roads from Cramond Bridge to Queensferry and Linlithgow Act 1811 (51 Geo. 3. c. lxiii))
Hunts and Northants Roads Act 1771 (repealed)	11 Geo. 3. c. 80	12 April 1771
An Act for enlarging the Term and Powers of several Acts made for repairing and amending that Part of the Road leading from a certain Place, called the White Post, on Alconbury Hill, in the County of Huntingdon, to Wandsford Bridge, in the said County, called the North Division of the North Road, and for repairing the Road leading from Stilton, in the said County of Huntingdon, to the City of Peterborough, in the County of Northampton. (Repealed by Alconbury Hill and Norman Cross Roads (Huntingdonshire) Act 1798 (38 Geo. 3. c. xlviii))
Wiltshire Roads Act 1771	11 Geo. 3. c. 81	28 March 1771
An Act to enlarge the Term and Powers of an Act, made in the Twenty-fourth Year of King George the Second, (Note: Wiltshire Roads Act 1750 (24 Geo. 2. c. 9)) for repairing the Road leading from West Lavington to the Devizes, and from the Devizes to Seend, in the County of Wilts.
Manchester Roads Act 1771 (repealed)	11 Geo. 3. c. 82	12 April 1771
An Act to enlarge the Term contained in Two several Acts of Parliament, and to repair, widen, and amend, the Road from the Guide Post at the Westerly End of Newton Lane, within the Township of Manchester, in the County Palatine of Lancaster, to Austerlands, in the Parish of Saddleworth, in the County of York. (Repealed by Oldham Roads Act 1799 (39 Geo. 3. c. xxv))
Tadcaster and York Road Act 1771 (repealed)	11 Geo. 3. c. 83	12 April 1771
An Act to enlarge the Term and Powers of an Act, made in the Eighteenth Year of King George the Second, (Note: Yorkshire Roads (No. 2) Act 1744 (18 Geo. 2. c. 16)) to repair the Road leading from Tadcaster Bridge, (Note: Tadcaster Bridge, Tadcaster, North Yorkshire. 53°53′06″N 1°15′36″W) within the County of the City of York, to a Place near the said City, called Hobmoor Lane End. (Note: The lane to Hob Moor from the A1063 Tadcaster Road, York, at the site of York Tyburn. 53°56′47″N 1°06′06″W) (Repealed by Tadcaster Bridge and Hob Moor Lane Road Act 1833 (3 & 4 Will. 4. c. lxxxiii))
Farringdon to Burford Road Act 1771 (repealed)	11 Geo. 3. c. 84	12 April 1771
An Act for repairing, widening, turning, and altering, the Road from the Market-house, in the Town of Great Farringdon, in the County of Berks, to Burford, in the County of Oxford. (Repealed by Road from Great Faringdon to Burford (Berkshire, Oxfordshire) Act 1833 (3 & 4 Will. 4. c. lxxiii))
Peebles Road Act 1771 (repealed)	11 Geo. 3. c. 85	29 April 1771
An Act for repairing and widening the Roads from the Town of Peebles to The King's Eatedge, and to Gatehope, Knowburnfoot, and to the Top of Minchmoor, and to Lochhead, in the County of Peebles. (Repealed by Roads in Peebles Act 1809 (49 Geo. 3. c. xxxvi))
Staffordshire Roads Act 1771 (repealed)	11 Geo. 3. c. 86	29 April 1771
An Act for repairing and widening the Road from Stone to Lane End, (Note: Lane End is now part of Longton, Staffordshire.) and to the Road between Leek and Sandon, on Meir Heath, and from thence to Blythe Bridge; and also from Meir to Trentham, and from thence to Stableford Bridge, in the County of Stafford. (Repealed by Stafford Roads Act 1792 (32 Geo. 3. c. 157))
Staffordshire Roads (No. 2) Act 1771 (repealed)	11 Geo. 3. c. 87	29 April 1771
An Act for repairing and widening the Road from Shelton to the Road between Cheadle and Leek, and from Bucknall to Weston Coyney, and from the Road between Cheadle and Leek to the Turnpike Road above Frogall Bridge, and from the same Road to the Road between Blyth Marsh and Thorp, at or near Ruchill Gate, in the County of Stafford. (Repealed by Road from Shelton to Blakeley Lane Head and from Bucknall to Weston Coyney Act 1813 (53 Geo. 3. c. cxxxv) and Annual Turnpike Acts Continuance Act 1877 (40 & 41 Vict. c. 64) (Note: Incorrectly cited as "Annual Turnpike Acts Continuance Act, 1887 c 64" in the Chronological Table of the Statutes.))
Leicester Roads Act 1771 (repealed)	11 Geo. 3. c. 88	29 April 1771
An Act to continue and render more effectual Two Acts, passed in the Twelfth Year of the Reign of King George the First, (Note: Leicestershire Road Act 1725 (12 Geo. 1. c. 5)) and the Nineteenth Year of the Reign of His late Majesty, (Note: Leicester Roads Act 1745 (19 Geo. 2. c. 10)) for repairing the Road from Market Harborough to Loughborough, in the County of Leicester; and for repairing, widening, turning, and altering, the Road branching out of the aforesaid Road at a Place called Filling Gate, to a Road called The Foss Road, and from thence to the Turnpike Road leading from Melton Mowbray to the Guide Post in Saint Margaret's Field, Leicester. (Repealed by Market Harborough and Loughborough Road Act 1813 (53 Geo. 3. c. xxiii) and Roads from Market Harborough to Loughborough Act 1830 (11 Geo. 4. & 1 Will. 4. c. iii))
Bradford to Idle Canal Act 1771	11 Geo. 3. c. 89	29 April 1771
An Act for making a navigable Cut or Canal from Bradford to join the Leeds and Liverpoole Canal, at Windhill, in the Township of Idle, in the County of York.
Ayr and Lanark Roads Act 1771 (repealed)	11 Geo. 3. c. 90	29 April 1771
An Act to enlarge the Term and Powers of an Act, made in the Twenty-sixth Year of the Reign of King George the Second, (Note: Glasgow and Shotts Road Act 1753 (26 Geo. 2. c. 81)) for repairing the Roads from Livingston, by the Kirk of Shotts, to the City of Glasgow, and by the Town of Hamilton, to the Town of Strathaven; and for repairing and widening the Road leading from the Confines of the County of Air, at or near Lochgate, to the Town of Strathaven, in the County of Lanerk. (Repealed by Livingston and Glasgow Road Act 1814 (54 Geo. 3. c. ccii))
Lancaster Roads Act 1771 (repealed)	11 Geo. 3. c. 91	8 May 1771
An Act to enlarge the Term and Powers of Three Acts, passed in the Twelfth Year of King George the First, (Note: Liverpool to Prescot Road Act 1725 (12 Geo. 1. c. 21)) and the Nineteenth (Note: Lancashire Roads Act 1745 (19 Geo. 2. c. 19)) and Twenty-sixth (Note: Lancashire Roads (No. 2) Act 1753 (26 Geo. 2. c. 65)) Years of His late Majesty, for repairing the Road from Liverpool to Prescott, and other Roads in the County Palatine of Lancaster; and for amending the Road from the Causeway at Blacklow Brow to the Causeway leading from Prescott to Liverpool, and also through Lime Kiln Lane to Ranelagh House, in Liverpoole aforesaid. (Repealed by Roads from Liverpool Act 1821 (1 & 2 Geo. 4. c. xv))
Worcester and Warwick Roads Act 1771 (repealed)	11 Geo. 3. c. 92	29 April 1771
An Act for enlarging and altering the Terms and Powers of several Acts, made in the Thirteenth Year of the Reign of King George the First, (Note: Bromsgrove and Birmingham Roads Act 1726 (13 Geo. 1. c. 15)) and in the Twenty-first Year of the Reign of King George the Second, (Note: Bromsgrove to Birmingham Roads Act 1747 (21 Geo. 2. c. 22)) for repairing the Roads leading from the Town of Bromsgrove to the Town of Dudley, in the County of Worcester, and from the said Town of Bromsgrove to the Town of Birmingham, in the County of Warwick, so far as the said Acts relate to the repairing of the Roads leading from the said Town of Birmingham to the said Town of Bromsgrove. (Repealed by Bromsgrove and Birmingham Road Act 1819 (59 Geo. 3. c. xlix))
Liverpool and Preston Road Act 1771 (repealed)	11 Geo. 3. c. 93	29 April 1771
An Act for repairing and widening the Road from Patrick's Cross, within the Town of Liverpoole, in the County Palatine of Lancaster, to the Town of Preston, in the same County Palatine. (Repealed by Liverpool to Preston Road Act 1786 (26 Geo. 3. c. 126))
Sussex Roads Act 1771 (repealed)	11 Geo. 3. c. 94	29 April 1771
An Act for repairing and widening the Road from the Turnpike Road at Vinehall, in the Parish of Mountfield, in the County of Sussex, to Cripps's Corner, and from thence to Staplecross, and to the Turnpike Road near the Windmill in the Parish of Beckley, and from Staplecross to Longley’s Water Corn Mill at Kent Ditch, and from Cripps's Corner to the Town of Rye in the said County. (Repealed by Road from Vinehall to Taylor's Corner (Sussex) Act 1832 (2 & 3 Will. 4. c. lvii))
Salop and Denbigh Roads Act 1771 (repealed)	11 Geo. 3. c. 95	29 April 1771
An Act for repairing and widening the Road leading from Wem, in the County of Salop, to the Lime Rocks at Bron y Garth, and several other Roads in the Counties of Salop and Denbigh. (Repealed by Wem and Bronygarth Roads Act 1856 (19 & 20 Vict. c. ciii))
Pembroke Roads Act 1771 (repealed)	11 Geo. 3. c. 96	29 April 1771
An Act for repairing, widening, and keeping in Repair, several Roads leading from Tavernspite, to the Towns of Pembroke and Tenby, and to Hubberston Haking, in the County of Pembroke. (Repealed by Roads from Tavernspite (Pembrokeshire) Act 1808 (48 Geo. 3. c. cxxxix))
Berkshire and Wiltshire Roads Act 1771 (repealed)	11 Geo. 3. c. 97	8 May 1771
An Act for amending and widening the Road from Besselsleigh through Wantage to Hungerford, in the County of Berks, and from Wantage to Marlborough, in the County of Wilts, and from the Turnpike Road between Reading and Watlingford through Halfpenny Lane to the Old Red House upon Wantage Downs, and from thence to Lamborn, in the said County of Berks. (Repealed by Besselsleigh Road Act 1858 (21 & 22 Vict. c. xlii))
Sussex Roads (No. 2) Act 1771 (repealed)	11 Geo. 3. c. 98	28 March 1771
An Act for repairing and widening the Road from Hodges to Beadles Hill, and from thence to the Town of Cuckfield, and from Beadles Hill aforesaid to the Town of Lindfield, and from the Turnpike Road between Cuckfield and Crawley to the Town of Horsham; and also the Road from Swingate in the Parish of Burwash, to Shover Green in the Parish of Ticehurst, all in the County of Sussex. (Repealed by Sussex Roads Act 1813 (53 Geo. 3. c. ccviii) and Roads from Hodges to Cuckfield Act 1833 (3 & 4 Will. 4. c. xliv))
Sussex Roads (No. 3) Act 1771 (repealed)	11 Geo. 3. c. 99	29 April 1771
An Act for repairing and widening the Roads from Hand Cross to Corner House, and from thence to the Turnpike Road leading from Horsham to Steyning, and from Corner House aforesaid to the Maypole in the Town of Henfield, in the County of Sussex. (Repealed by Roads through Cowfold Act 1830 (11 Geo. 4. & 1 Will. 4. c. civ))

=== Private acts ===
Short title	Citation	Royal assent
Long title
Perny's Naturalization Act 1771	11 Geo. 3. c. 1 Pr.	29 November 1770
An Act for naturalizing Bernard Perny.
Lowick Inclosure Act 1771	11 Geo. 3. c. 2 Pr.	17 December 1770
An Act for dividing and enclosing the Common and Open Fields, Commonable Lands, and Waste Grounds, within the Manor and Parish of Lowick in the County of Northampton.
Crinsoz's Naturalization Act 1771	11 Geo. 3. c. 3 Pr.	17 December 1770
An Act for naturalizing Lewis Benjamin Crinsoz.
Slipton Inclosure Act 1771	11 Geo. 3. c. 4 Pr.	21 December 1770
An Act for dividing and enclosing the Common and Open Fields, Commonable Lands, and Waste Grounds, within the Manor and Parish of Slipton in the County of Northampton.
Lockington and Ayke (Yorkshire, East Riding) Inclosure Act 1771	11 Geo. 3. c. 5 Pr.	21 December 1770
An Act for dividing and enclosing the several Open Fields, Meadows, Pastures, Commons, Carrs, and other unenclosed Grounds, within the several Townships of Lockington and Ayke, in the East Riding of the County of York; and for extinguishing Thirtieth Right of Common or Average Upon certain ancient Enclosures within the said Township of Lockington.
Portman's Naturalization Act 1771	11 Geo. 3. c. 6 Pr.	21 December 1770
An Act for naturalizing Gerard Portman.
Earl Ferrers' Estate Act 1771	11 Geo. 3. c. 7 Pr.	8 March 1771
An Act for more effectually vesting the Reversion in Fee Simple of and in divers Lands and Hereditaments in the Counties of Derby, Leicester, Nottingham, and Stafford, in Washington Earl Ferrers and his Trustees, and for confirming Letters Patent granted thereof, and of certain other Lands and Hereditaments in the County of Northampton, to the said Earl, in the Third Year of His present Majesty’s Reign, and for other Purposes therein mentioned.
Rendering valid and effectual articles of agreement between William Lambton, Richard Lord Bishop of Durham and others.	11 Geo. 3. c. 8 Pr.	8 March 1771
An Act to render valid and effectual certain Articles of Agreement between William Lambton Esquire, and the Honourable and Right Reverend Richard Lord Bishop of Durham, and the other Persons therein named.
Enabling the Bishop of Hereford to exchange lands in Herefordshire.	11 Geo. 3. c. 9 Pr.	8 March 1771
An Act to enable the Bishop of Hereford to exchange certain Lands and Premises in the County of Hereford.
Viscount Midleton's Estate Act 1771	11 Geo. 3. c. 10 Pr.	8 March 1771
An Act for explaining and amending an Act, intituled, "An Act for vesting Part of the Fee Simple Estate of George late Lord Viscount Midleton of the Kingdom of Ireland, in Trustees, to be sold for paying the Debts, Legacies, and Incumbrances, mentioned in and appointed to be paid by his Will; and for executing and effectuating several Contracts entered into by him for selling and leasing divers Farms and Lands in Ireland; and for making the Exemplification of his Will Evidence in Law and Equity." (Note: Viscount Midleton's Estate Act 1766 (6 Geo. 3. c. 39 Pr.))
Delaval's Estate Act 1771	11 Geo. 3. c. 11 Pr.	8 March 1771
An Act to empower Sir Francis Blake Delaval, Knight of the Bath, or the Person or Persons claiming under a Settlement of his Family Estates, dated the Nineteenth Day of January One thousand seven hundred and forty-eight, to grant to Thomas Delaval Esquire, his Heirs and Assigns, a certain Parcel of Land and Buildings, Liberties and Privileges; and also to grant Two several Leases for Ninety-nine Years each, to or in Trust for the said Thomas Delaval, and Sir John Hussey Delaval Baronet, of certain Lands, Copperas Works, Buildings, Liberties, and Privileges, in the Manors of Hartley and Seaton Delaval in the County of Northumberland, Part of the settled Estates of the said Sir Francis Blake Delaval; and for other Purposes therein mentioned.
Essington's Estate Act 1771	11 Geo. 3. c. 12 Pr.	8 March 1771
An Act for effectuating a Conveyance of the Real Estates late of John Essington Esquire deceased, to the Purchases thereof, under a Decree or Order of the High Court of Chancery.
Aylesbury Inclosure Act 1771	11 Geo. 3. c. 13 Pr.	8 March 1771
An Act for dividing and enclosing the Open and Common Fields within the Township and Liberties of Aylesbury in the County of ucks.
Whitchurch Inclosure Act 1771	11 Geo. 3. c. 14 Pr.	8 March 1771
An Act for dividing and enclosing the Open and Common Fields, Common Meadows, Common Grounds, and Commonable Lands within the Parish of Whitchurch in the County of Bucks.
Kirkby Mallory Inclosure Act 1771	11 Geo. 3. c. 15 Pr.	8 March 1771
An Act for dividing and enclosing the Open Fields and Common Pastures in the Parish of Kirkby Mallory in the County of Leicester.
Keyham Inclosure Act 1771	11 Geo. 3. c. 16 Pr.	8 March 1771
An Act for dividing, allotting, and enclosing the Open Fields and Commonable Places in Keyham in the Parish of Rothley and County of Leicester.
Hill Croome Inclosure Act 1771	11 Geo. 3. c. 17 Pr.	8 March 1771
An Act for dividing and enclosing the Common Fields, Meadows, Commons, or Waste Lands, within the Manor and Parish of Hill Croome in the County of Worcester.
Barniker Moor Inclosure Act 1771	11 Geo. 3. c. 18 Pr.	8 March 1771
An Act for dividing and enclosing Barniker Moor, within the Manor of Nether Wyersdale in the County Palatine of Lancaster.
Fairfield (Derbyshire) Inclosure Act 1771	11 Geo. 3. c. 19 Pr.	8 March 1771
An Act for dividing and enclosing the several Open Fields, Common Pasture, Commons and Waste Grounds, within the Township, Hamlet, or Liberty of Fairfield, in the Parish of Hope and County of Derby.
Great Brickhill (Buckinghamshire) Inclosure Act 1771	11 Geo. 3. c. 20 Pr.	8 March 1771
An Act for dividing and enclosing the Open and Common Fields, Common Meadows, Common Pastures, Lammas Grounds, and other Commonable Lands and Grounds in the Parish of Great Brickhill in the County of Bucks.
Sproxton (Leicestershire) Inclosure Act 1771	11 Geo. 3. c. 21 Pr.	8 March 1771
An Act for dividing and enclosing the Open and Common Fields, Common Pastures, Common Meadows, Heath, and other Commonable Lands, in the Parish of Sproxton in the County of Leicester.
Rilston (Yorkshire, West Riding) Inclosure Act 1771	11 Geo. 3. c. 22 Pr.	8 March 1771
An Act for dividing and enclosing the several Stinted Pastures called the North Moor, Longhill Barky and Garforth Close, within the Township of Rilston in the West Riding of the County of York.
Saltby (Leicestershire) Inclosure Act 1771	11 Geo. 3. c. 23 Pr.	8 March 1771
An Act for dividing and enclosing the Open and Common Fields, Common Pastures, Common Meadows, Heath, find other Commonable Lands in the Parish of Saltby in the County of Leicester.
Lord Ducie's Name Act 1771	11 Geo. 3. c. 24 Pr.	8 March 1771
An Act to enable the Right Honourable Thomas Lord Ducie and his Issue to take the Surname of Moreton, and to bear and use the Arms of Honour of the Right Honourable Matthew Lord Ducie deceased, pursuant to the Will of the said Matthew Lord Ducie.
Samuel Pitchford's Name Act 1771	11 Geo. 3. c. 25 Pr.	8 March 1771
An Act to enable Captain Samuel Pitchford, and the Heirs Male of his Body, to take and use the Surname and bear the Arms of Sir Samuel Cornish, deceased, pursuant to his Will.
Thomas Grundy's Name Act 1771	11 Geo. 3. c. 26 Pr.	8 March 1771
An Act to enable Thomas Grundy, and his Issue Male, to take and use the Surname of Swinsen.
William Mackenzie and David and John Gravier: change of name and arms to Godfrey.	11 Geo. 3. c. 27 Pr.	8 March 1771
An Act to enable William Mackenzie, David Gravier, and John Gravier, respectively, and the Heirs Male of their respective Bodies, to take and use the Surname and Arms of Godfrey.
Making the exemplification of Francis Macartney's will evidence in all British and Irish courts.	11 Geo. 3. c. 28 Pr.	8 March 1771
An Act for making the Exemplification of the last Will and Testament of Francis Macartney Esquire deceased, Evidence in all Courts of Law and Equity in Great Britain and Ireland.
Knight's Divorce Act 1771	11 Geo. 3. c. 29 Pr.	8 March 1771
An Act to dissolve the Marriage of Henry Knight Esquire, with Catharine Lynch his now Wife, and to enable him to marry again, and for other; Purposes therein mentioned.
Renner's Naturalization Act 1771	11 Geo. 3. c. 30 Pr.	8 March 1771
An Act for naturalising Henry Renner.
Rendering valid and effectual articles of agreement of 21 July 1770, between Frances Countess Dowager of Londonderry, Philip Earl of Stanhope and others and for vesting manors and lands in Devon and Wiltshire in trustees for purposes therein mentioned.	11 Geo. 3. c. 31 Pr.	28 March 1771
An Act for rendering valid and effectual certain Articles of Agreement, bearing Date the Twenty-first Day of July One thousand seven hundred and seventy, made between Frances Countess Dowager of Londonderry, Philip Earl Stanhope, and others; and for vetting several Manors, Lands, and Hereditaments, in the Counties of Devon and Wilts, in Trustees, for the Purposes in the Act mentioned.
Rendering effectual an exchange of glebe lands belonging to the rectory of Avington (Hampshire) for other lands there belonging to the Marquis of Caernarvon.	11 Geo. 3. c. 32 Pr.	28 March 1771
An Act for rendering effectual an Exchange of certain Lands, Parcel of the Glebe of the Rectory of Avington, in the County of Southampton, for certain other Lands, in the said Parish of Avington, belonging to the Most Honourable the Marquis of Carnarvon.
Enabling Francis Charteris (formerly Wemyss), and certain others, and their heirs male, to retain, assume and sign the name of Charteris, bear its arms and hold a certain estate notwithstanding the descent to them of the honour and title of Wemyss or any other honour or title.	11 Geo. 3. c. 33 Pr.	28 March 1771
An Act to enable Francis Charteris Esquire, heretofore called Francis Wemyss, and the Heirs of his Body, and several other Persons therein named, and the Heirs of their respective Bodies, to retain, assume, and sign, the Name of Charteris, and to bear the Arms of Charteris, and to hold and enjoy the Estate therein mentioned, notwithstanding the Descent to him or them respectively of the Honour and Title of Wemyss, or any other Honour or Title whatsoever.
Establishing and confirming an exchange of a piece of inclosed land for inclosed glebe land in East Barnet (Hertfordshire), pursuant to an agreement between the parish rector Benjamin Underwood and John Pybus.	11 Geo. 3. c. 34 Pr.	28 March 1771
An Act for establishing and confirming an Exchange of a certain Piece of enclosed Land in the Parish of East Barnet, in the County of Hertford and Diocese of London, for other enclosed Land, Parcel of the Glebe of the said Parish, pursuant to an Agreement between Benjamin Underwood Clerk, Master of Arts, Rector of the said Parish of East Barnet, and John Pybus Esquire.
Exemplifying Charles Macarthy More's will and making it evidence in all Irish as well as British Courts.	11 Geo. 3. c. 35 Pr.	28 March 1771
An Act for exemplifying or enrolling the Will of Charles Macarthy More deceased, and making the same Evidence as well in Ireland as Great Britain.
Alveston (Warwickshire) Inclosure Act 1771	11 Geo. 3. c. 36 Pr.	28 March 1771
An Act for dividing and enclosing the Common fields, Common Meadows, Common Wood Grounds, and Commonable Lands, in the Parish of Alveston, in the County of Warwick.
Aston Subedge (Gloucestershire) Inclosure Act 1771	11 Geo. 3. c. 37 Pr.	28 March 1771
An Act for dividing and enclosing certain Common Fields, Common Meadows, and Commonable Waste Grounds, within the Manor and Parish of Aston Subedge, in the County Gloucester.
Myton Carr (Kingston-upon-Hull) Inclosure Act 1771	11 Geo. 3. c. 38 Pr.	28 March 1771
An Act for dividing and enclosing a certain Common Pasture called Myton Carr, in the Lordship of Myton, in the Parish of the Holy Trinity, in the Town and County of the Town of Kingston upon Hull.
East Garston (Berkshire) Inclosure Act 1771	11 Geo. 3. c. 39 Pr.	28 March 1771
An Act for dividing, and allotting the Common Fields, Downs, and all other the Commonable Lands and Waste Grounds, in the Manor and Parish of East, Garston, in the County of Berks.
Monyash (Derbyshire) Inclosure Act 1771	11 Geo. 3. c. 40 Pr.	28 March 1771
An Act for dividing and enclosing the Commons and Waste Grounds within the Manor of Monyash, in the Parish of Bakewell, in the County of Derby.
Lisset (Yorkshire, East Riding) Inclosure Act 1771	11 Geo. 3. c. 41 Pr.	28 March 1771
An Act for dividing and enclosing the several Open Arable Fields, Meadows, Pastures, Carrs, and other Open and Common Grounds, within the Township of Lisset, in the Parish of Beeforth, otherwise Beford, in the East Riding of the County of York.
Priestwood Common (Derbyshire) Inclosure Act 1771	11 Geo. 3. c. 42 Pr.	28 March 1771
An Act for dividing and enclosing Priestwood Common, in the Parishes of Mackworth, Kedleston, and Meynell Langley, or some of them, in the County of Derby.
Horncastle and West Ashby (Lincolnshire) Inclosure Act 1771	11 Geo. 3. c. 43 Pr.	28 March 1771
An Act for dividing and enclosing the Open and Common Fields, Cow Pastures, Ings, Common Meadows, and other Commonable Lands, in the Parish of West Ashby, within the Manors of Horncastle and West Ashby, in the County of Lincoln.
Kilham on the Wolds (Yorkshire) Inclosure Act 1771	11 Geo. 3. c. 44 Pr.	28 March 1771
An Act for dividing, enclosing, and allotting the several Open Fields, Lands, and Grounds, within the Township of Kilham on the Woulds, in the County of York.
Horninglow (Staffordshire) Inclosure Act 1771	11 Geo. 3. c. 45 Pr.	28 March 1771
An Act for dividing and enclosing a certain Parcel of Common and Waste Ground called the Outwoods, within the Township or Hamlet of Horninglow, in the Parish of Burton, in the County of Stafford.
Stapenhill and Winshill (Derbyshire) Inclosure Act 1771	11 Geo. 3. c. 46 Pr.	28 March 1771
An Act for dividing and enclosing several Open Fields, Common or Waste Lands, Stinted Pastures, and Commonable Grounds, within the Hamlets of Stapenhill and Winshill, in the County of Derby.
Burton-upon-Trent (Staffordshire) Inclosure Act 1771	11 Geo. 3. c. 47 Pr.	28 March 1771
An Act for dividing and enclosing the several Open Fields, Common Meadows, Stinted Pastures, Commons, and Waste Lands, in the several Hamlets of Stretton, Horninglow, Bond End, and Branston, within the Parish of Burton upon Trent, in the County of Stafford.
Hetton (Yorkshire, West Riding) Inclosure Act 1771	11 Geo. 3. c. 48 Pr.	28 March 1771
An Act for dividing and enclosing the several Pastures within the Township of Hetton, in the Parish of Burnsal, and West Riding of the County of York.
South Reston (Lincolnshire) Inclosure Act 1771	11 Geo. 3. c. 49 Pr.	28 March 1771
An Act for dividing and enclosing certain Open Common Fields and Commonable Grounds, within the Manor and Parish of South Reston, in the County of Lincoln.
Boothby Graffoe (Lincolnshire) Inclosure Act 1771	11 Geo. 3. c. 50 Pr.	28 March 1771
An Act for dividing and enclosing the Open and Common Fields, Meadows, Pastures, Heath, and Waste Grounds, within the Manor and Parish of Boothby Graffoe, in the County of Lincoln.
Scalby and Throxenby or Newby Moor (Yorkshire, North Riding) Inclosures Act 1771	11 Geo. 3. c. 51 Pr.	28 March 1771
An Act for dividing and enclosing the Open and unenclosed Fields, Lands, Commons, and Wastes, within the Manor of Scalby, in the North Riding of the County of York; and also a certain Common called Throxenby Moor, otherwise Newby Moor, within the same Riding.
Welton Inclosure Act 1771	11 Geo. 3. c. 52 Pr.	28 March 1771
An Act for dividing and enclosing certain Fields, Lands, and Waste Grounds, within the Township of Melton, in the Parish of Welton, in the East Riding of the County of York.
Donnington (Salop.) Inclosure Act 1771	11 Geo. 3. c. 53 Pr.	28 March 1771
An Act for dividing and enclosing the Common Fields, and the Common or Heath called Kilsall Heath, and other Commonable Lands, in the Parish of Donington, in the County of Salop.
Holland or Hollin Ward (Derbyshire) Inclosure Act 1771	11 Geo. 3. c. 54 Pr.	28 March 1771
An Act for dividing and enclosing a certain Common called Holland Ward, otherwise Hollin Ward, in the County of Derby.
Broadway (Worcestershire) Inclosure Act 1771	11 Geo. 3. c. 55 Pr.	28 March 1771
An Act for dividing, and enclosing the Open and Common Fields and Commonable Lands, within the Manor of Broadway, in the County of Worcester.
Tardebigge Inclosure Act 1771	11 Geo. 3. c. 56 Pr.	28 March 1771
An Act for dividing and enclosing certain Commons, Commonable Grounds, and Wastes, called Redditch Common and Webheath, situate in that Part of the Manor of Tardebigg which lies in the County of Worcester; and for other Purposes therein mentioned.
Stapleford and Bramcote (Nottinghamshire) Inclosure Act 1771	11 Geo. 3. c. 57 Pr.	28 March 1771
An Act for dividing and enclosing the Open Fields, Meadows, Commons, and Common Pastures, within the Liberties of Stapleford and Bramcote, in the County of Nottingham.
Butler's Marston (Warwickshire) Inclosure Act 1771	11 Geo. 3. c. 58 Pr.	28 March 1771
An Act for dividing and enclosing the Open and Common Fields, Common Meadows, and Commonable Lands and Grounds, in the Parish of Butler's Marston, in the County of Warwick.
Appleby (Leicestershire, Derbyshire) Inclosure Act 1771	11 Geo. 3. c. 59 Pr.	28 March 1771
An Act for dividing and enclosing the open Fields, Commons, and Waste Grounds, lying in the Parish of Appleby, in the Counties of Leicester and Derby.
Feckenham (Worcestershire) Inclosure Act 1771	11 Geo. 3. c. 60 Pr.	28 March 1771
An Act for dividing and enclosing the Open and Common Fields, Common Meadows, and Commonable Lands and Grounds, called Beanhall Fields, in the Manor and Parish of Feckenham, in the County of Worcester.
Oxenhope (Yorkshire) Inclosure Act 1771	11 Geo. 3. c. 61 Pr.	28 March 1771
An Act for dividing and enclosing the Common and Waste Grounds, within the Village, Hamlet, Township, and Manor, of Oxenhope, in the Parish of Bradford and County of York.
North Muskham, Holme, and Bathley (Nottinghamshire) Inclosures Act 1771	11 Geo. 3. c. 62 Pr.	28 March 1771
An Act for dividing and enclosing the Open Fields, Meadows, Common Pastures, and Waste Grounds, within the Townships of North Muskham, Holme, and Barthley, in the Parish of North Muskham, in the County of Nottingham.
Empowering Sir John Gibbons to close footpaths and to extinguish all claims and rights of common over lands in Stanwell (Middlesex) and to oblige him to make and maintain a footpath in lieu thereof and vest certain premises and money in trustees for the uses of the parish poor.	11 Geo. 3. c. 63 Pr. (Note: Given royal assent as a public act.)	29 April 1771
An Act to empower Sir John Gibbons to shut up the Foot Paths over certain Lands in the Parish of Stanwell, in the County of Middlesex; and to extinguish all Claims and Right of Common in and over the said Lands; and to oblige the said Sir John Gibbons to make and keep in Repair a Foot Path in lieu thereof; and to vest certain Premises and a Sum of Money in Trustees, for the Use of the Poor of the said Parish.
Naturalization of John Du Roveray, John Naville, John Eynard, David Chollett, and John Gertcken Act 1771	11 Geo. 3. c. 64 Pr.	28 March 1771
An Act for naturalizing John Peter du Roveray, John Daniel Neville, John Peter Eynard, David Chollett, and John Zacharias Gertcken.
Naturalization of Augustine Noverre Act 1771	11 Geo. 3. c. 65 Pr.	28 March 1771
An Act for naturalizing Augustin Noverre.
Empowering the Scottish court of session to sell parts and portions of the estate and barony of Carrington (Edinburgh) formerly belonging to Hugh Viscount Primrose and now Neil Earl of Rosenberry for payment of the former's debts.	11 Geo. 3. c. 66 Pr.	12 April 1771
An Act for empowering the judges of the Court of Session in Scotland, to sell certain Parts and Portions of the Estate and Barony of Carrington, in the County of Edinburgh, which formerly belonged to Hugh Lord Viscount Primrose deceased, and now to Neil Earl of Rosebery, for Payment of the Debts of the said Viscount.
John Sutton's estate in Lincolnshire: sale of part for payment of £8,000, Isabella Sutton's portion.	11 Geo. 3. c. 67 Pr.	12 April 1771
An Act for vesting certain Lands and Hereditaments, Part of the Real Estate of John Sutton Esquire, situate in the County of Lincoln, in Trust, to be sold for Payment of Eight thousand Pounds, the Portion of Isabella Sutton deceased, and for the other Purposes in the said Act mentioned.
Sheriff-Hales (Staffordshire) Inclosure Act 1771	11 Geo. 3. c. 68 Pr.	12 April 1771
An Act for dividing and enclosing Sheriffhales Common, in the County of Stafford.
Algarkirke cum Fosdyke (Lincolnshire) Inclosure Act 1771	11 Geo. 3. c. 69 Pr.	12 April 1771
An Act for dividing and enclosing the several Parcels of Fen Land, within the Parish of Algarkirke cum Fosdyke, in the Parts of Holland, in the County of Lincoln.
Swalcliffe (Oxfordshire) Inclosure Act 1771	11 Geo. 3. c. 70 Pr.	12 April 1771
An Act for dividing and enclosing the Open and Common Fields in the Parish of Swalcliffe, in the County of Oxford.
Earl of Scarborough's Estate Act 1771	11 Geo. 3. c. 71 Pr.	29 April 1771
An Act for discharging the Manor of Coldheseldon, and divers Messuages, Lands, and Hereditaments, Part of the Estate of Richard Earl of Scarbrough, from the Uses, Estates, and Trusts, declared concerning the same, by the Settlement executed previous to his Marriage with Barbara Countess of Scarbrough his Wife, and by a certain Act of Parliament which passed in the Seventh Year of His present Majesty's Reign, and for settling another Manor and other Lands and Hereditaments, of greater Value, in Lieu thereof, to the like Uses.
Sir Henry Harpur's estate in Derbyshire and Staffordshire: making leases for three lives or 99 years.	11 Geo. 3. c. 72 Pr.	29 April 1771
An Act for enabling Sir Henry Harpur Baronet to make Leases of his Estates in the Counties of Derby and Stafford, for Three Lives, or Ninety-nine Years, or such other Leases as are therein mentioned.
Sir John Shelley's and John Shelley's estates: sale of parts in Kent and Wiltshire and Kinston Farm in St. Pancras (Sussex) for payment of Sir John's daughters' portions.	11 Geo. 3. c. 73 Pr.	29 April 1771
An Act for Sale of Part of the Settled Estates of Sir John Shelley Baronet, and of the Right Honourable John Shelley his Son, in the several Counties of Kent and Wilts; and also of a Farm, called Kingsham Farm, in the Parish of Saint Pancres, in the County of Sussex; and for applying the Monies to arise by such Sale, in Discharge of the Portions of the Daughters of the said Sir John Shelley, affecting the Estates of him and his said Son, and for other Purposes.
Exchange of lands in Langham (Suffolk) between Patrick Blake and Edward Burch, the parish rector.	11 Geo. 3. c. 74 Pr.	29 April 1771
An Act to exchange Lands in Langham, in the County of Suffolk, between Patrick Blake Esquire, and Edward Burch Rector of the Parish Church of Langham aforesaid, within the Diocese of Norwich.
Joseph Bullock's estate: sale of lands and mills contained in his marriage settlement and purchase of other lands with sale proceeds.	11 Geo. 3. c. 75 Pr.	29 April 1771
An Act for vesting certain Freehold and Leasehold Mills, Lands, and Tenements, comprised in the Marriage Settlement of Joseph Bullock Esquire, in Trustees, to convey and assign the same respectively, pursuant to an Agreement for the Sale thereof, and for laying out the Money arising by such Sale, in the Purchase of other Lands and Hereditaments, to be settled to the same Uses as are mentioned in said Settlement.
Confirming a conveyance to Henry Flitcroft of estates in Yorkshire, purchased by the trustees of Charles and Fanny Goring's marriage settlement and for confirming a conveyance made by said Henry for the use of the said trustees of other estates in Surrey.	11 Geo. 3. c. 76 Pr.	29 April 1771
An Act for confirming a Conveyance to Henry Flitcroft Esquire, of certain Estates in the County of York, Purchased by the Trustees, in the Marriage Settlement of Charles Goring Esquire, and Fanny his Wife, and for confirming a Conveyance made by the said Henry Flitcroft, to the Use of the said Trustees of other Estates, in Lieu thereof, in the County of Surrey.
William and Frances Pultney's leasehold estates in Westminster: enabling surviving trustees named in their settlement to grant leases.	11 Geo. 3. c. 77 Pr.	29 April 1771
An Act to enable the surviving Trustee named in the Settlement of William Pulteney Esquire and Frances his Wife, to grant Leases of their Leasehold Estates in Westminster.
Confirming a deed dated 31 December 1770 and for more effectually enabling trustees to raise £9,000 by mortgage or sale of George and George (the younger) Smythe's estate in Gloucestershire for purposes therein mentioned.	11 Geo. 3. c. 78 Pr.	29 April 1771
An Act for confirming a Deed of Trust dated the Thirty-first of December One thousand seven hundred and seventy, and for the more effectual enabling the Trustees to raise the Sum of Nine Thousand Pounds, for the Purposes therein mentioned, by Mortgage or Sale of the Freehold Estate of George Smyth the Elder and George Smyth the Younger, Esquires, situate in the County of Gloucester, or of a competent Part thereof.
Nicholas Corsellis' estate at Wivenhoe and Elmsted (Essex): sale for payment of incumbrances.	11 Geo. 3. c. 79 Pr.	29 April 1771
An Act for vesting Part of the Estate late of Nicholas Corsellis Esquire deceased, at Wivenhoe and Elmsted, in the County of Essex, in Trustees, to be sold for raising Money to discharge Incumbrances.
Thomas and Hannah Froggatt's estate: vesting in trustees the manor of Astley and lands in Astley, Tyldesley and Bedford (Lancashire), comprised in their marriage articles, to the uses and trusts and subject to the powers, provisos and restrictions therein mentioned.	11 Geo. 3. c. 80 Pr.	29 April 1771
An Act for vesting the Manor of Astley and certain Messuages, Lands, Tenements, and Hereditaments, in Astley, Tyldesley, and Bedford, in the County of Lancaster, comprised in the Marriage Articles of Thomas Froggatt and Hannah his Wife, in Trustees, to the several Uses, upon the Trusts, and subject to the Powers, Provisoes, and Restrictions, therein mentioned.
Estates of Thomas Parkinson, Edward and Catherine Heathcote and their respective children: sale of part for payment of debts and legacies and making a partition of the remainder.	11 Geo. 3. c. 81 Pr.	29 April 1771
An Act for vesting the Settled Estates of Thomas Parkinson, Edward Heathcote, and Catharine his Wife, and their respective Children, lying in the Counties of Nottingham, Lincoln, and Chester, in Trustees, to sell a sufficient Part thereof for Payment of Debts and Legacies affecting the same; and for making a Partition of the Remainder thereof, and settling the entire Premises to the Uses therein mentioned.
Discharging from tithe lands in Sebraham or Sebergham (Cumberland) and compensating the parish curate in lieu thereof.	11 Geo. 3. c. 82 Pr.	29 April 1771
An Act for discharging from Tithe certain Lands in the Parish of Sebraham, otherwise Sebergham, in the County of Cumberland; and for making Compensation to the Curate of the said Parish for the same.
Ladus Fen (Isle of Ely, Cambridgeshire) drainage.	11 Geo. 3. c. 83 Pr.	29 April 1771
An Act for draining and preserving certain Fen Lands and Low Grounds in Ladus Fen, in the Isle of Ely.
Waverton or Wareton (Warwickshire) Inclosure Act 1771	11 Geo. 3. c. 84 Pr.	29 April 1771
An Act for dividing and enclosing the Open and Common Fields, Common Meadows, Common Pastures, and other Commonable Places, in Waverton, otherwise Wareton, in the Parish of Polesworth, in the County of Warwick.
Hampstead Norreys (Berkshire) Inclosure Act 1771	11 Geo. 3. c. 85 Pr.	29 April 1771
An Act for dividing and enclosing the several Open and Common Fields, Commonable Lands, and Waste Grounds, within the Manor of Hampstead Norreys, in the Parish of Hampstead Norreys, in the County of Berks.
Stretton on the Foss (Warwickshire) Inclosure Act 1771	11 Geo. 3. c. 86 Pr.	29 April 1771
An Act for dividing and enclosing certain Open and Common Fields, called Stretton Common Field, and certain Common or Waste Grounds, called Stretton Heath and Stretton Horse Slead, in the Parish of Stretton on the Foss, in the County of Warwick.
Knightcot and Northend (Warwickshire) Inclosure Act 1771	11 Geo. 3. c. 87 Pr.	29 April 1771
An Act for dividing and enclosing the several Open and Common Fields, Arable, Meadow, and Pasture Grounds, Lammas Grounds, and Commonable Lands, within the Hamlets and Liberties of Knightcot and Northend, in the, Parish of Burton Dassett, in the County of Warwick.
Naunton Beauchamp (Worcestershire) Inclosure Act 1771	11 Geo. 3. c. 88 Pr.	29 April 1771
An Act for dividing and enclosing the Open and Common Fields, Common Meadows, and Commonable Lands, within the Parish of Naunton Beauchamp, in the County of Worcester.
Kilby and Newton Harcourt (Leicestershire) Inclosure Act 1771	11 Geo. 3. c. 89 Pr.	29 April 1771
An Act for dividing and enclosing the Open Fields, Meadows, Common Pastures, and all other Common and Waste Lands, in the Liberties or Hamlets of Kilby and Newton Harcourt, in the Parish of Wistow and County of Leicester.
Stretton under Foss (Warwickshire) Inclosure Act 1771	11 Geo. 3. c. 90 Pr.	29 April 1771
An Act for dividing and enclosing the Open and Common Fields of Stretton under Foss, in the Parish of Monks Kirby, in the County of Warwick.
Bishop Norton Inclosure Act 1771	11 Geo. 3. c. 91 Pr.	29 April 1771
An Act for dividing and enclosing certain Open Fields, Lands, and Grounds, in the Township and Parish of Bishop Norton, in the County of Lincoln.
Long Riston and Arnold (Yorkshire) Inclosure Act 1771	11 Geo. 3. c. 92 Pr.	29 April 1771
An Act for dividing and enclosing all the Open Fields, Lands, and Grounds, at Long Riston and Arnold, in the County of York.
Pattishall (Northamptonshire) Inclosure Act 1771	11 Geo. 3. c. 93 Pr.	29 April 1771
An Act for dividing and enclosing the Open and Common Fields, Common Meadows, Common Pastures, and other Commonable Lands and Grounds, within the Parish and Liberties of Pattishall, within the Hamlets of Eascote, Astcote, and Darlescote, in the County of Northampton.
Hartford (Huntingdonshire) Inclosure Act 1771	11 Geo. 3. c. 94 Pr.	29 April 1771
An Act for dividing, allotting, and enclosing, the Open and Commonable Fields, Meadows, Pastures, Lands, and Waste Grounds, of, within, and belonging to, the Manor, Parish, and Liberties, of Hartford, in the County of Huntingdon.
Butterwick (Yorkshire, East Riding) Inclosure Act 1771	11 Geo. 3. c. 95 Pr.	29 April 1771
An Act for dividing and enclosing the Open Fields in the Township of Butterwick, in the Parish of Foxholes, in the haft Riding of the County of York.
East Barton (Northamptonshire) Inclosure Act 1771	11 Geo. 3. c. 96 Pr.	29 April 1771
An Act for dividing and enclosing the Open and Common Fields, Common Meadows, Common Pastures, Common Grounds, and Waste Grounds, in the Parish of Earls Barton, in the County of Northampton.
Wedon and Weston, or Wedon Pickney, or Loys Wedon (Northamptonshire) Inclosure Act 1771	11 Geo. 3. c. 97 Pr.	29 April 1771
An Act for dividing and enclosing the Open and Common Fields, Common Meadows, Common Pastures, Common Grounds, and Commonable Lands, within the Manor and Parish of Wedon and Weston, otherwise Wedon Pinkney, otherwise Loys Wedon, in the County of Northampton.
Watford and Murcott (Northamptonshire) Inclosure Act 1771	11 Geo. 3. c. 98 Pr.	29 April 1771
An Act for dividing and enclosing the Open and Common Fields, Common Pastures, Common Meadows, Common Grounds, and Commonable Lands, within the Parish and Liberties of Watford, and within the Hamlet and Liberties of Murcott, in the Parishes of Watford and Long Buckby, in the County of Northampton.
St. Oswald Inclosure Act 1771	11 Geo. 3. c. 99 Pr.	29 April 1771
An Act for dividing and enclosing the Moor or Common, called Elvet Moor, in the Parish of Saint Oswald, in the County Palatine of Durham; and for extinguishing all Right of Common in certain Intercommon Lands, in the said Parish.
Misterton (Nottinghamshire) Inclosure Act 1771	11 Geo. 3. c. 100 Pr.	29 April 1771
An Act for dividing and enclosing the Open Arable Fields, Meadows, Pastures, Commons, and Waste Grounds, in the Parish of Misterton, in the County of Nottingham.
Ubly (Somerset) Inclosure Act 1771	11 Geo. 3. c. 101 Pr.	29 April 1771
An Act for dividing and enclosing the Commonable Lands and Waste Grounds, within the Manor and Parish of Ubly, in the County of Somerset.
Naturalization of Jacob Justus and Theophilus Blackenhagen Act 1771	11 Geo. 3. c. 102 Pr.	29 April 1771
An Act for naturalizing Jacob Matthias Justus and Theophilus Christian Blanckenhagen.
Naturalization of Francis Harraand Act 1771	11 Geo. 3. c. 103 Pr.	29 April 1771
An Act for naturalizing Francis Harrand.
Duke of Portland's Estate Act 1771	11 Geo. 3. c. 104 Pr.	8 May 1771
An Act for vesting in Trustees, and their Heirs, several Manors, Messuages, Lands, and Hereditaments, in the County of Southampton, the Estate of the Most Noble William Henry Cavendish Duke of Portland, upon Trust, to sell the same, and to apply the Money to arise by Sale thereof, in Manner therein mentioned.
Williams' Estate Act 1771	11 Geo. 3. c. 105 Pr.	8 May 1771
An Act for vesting the Manor, Capital Messuage, Barton Farm, and Demesne Lands, of Cadhay, situate in Ottery Saint Mary, in the County of Devon, Part of the Settled Estate of Sir Booth Williams Baronet, in Trustees, to be sold, and for laying out the Money arising by such Sale in the Purchase of other Lands and Hereditaments, to be settled to the same Uses which are now subsisting with regard to the said Settled Estate.
Confirming and executing an agreement dated 23 June 1770, between Humfrey Minchin and George Clive and for vesting estates in Tipperary (Ireland) in trustees for that purpose.	11 Geo. 3. c. 106 Pr.	8 May 1771
An Act for confirming and carrying into Execution an Agreement dated the Twenty-third Day of June One thousand seven hundred and seventy, between Humphr Minchin Esquire and George Clive Esquire; and for vesting certain Estates in the County of Tipperary. in the Kingdom of Ireland, in certain Trustees and their Heirs for that Purpose.
Theobald's Estate Act 1771	11 Geo. 3. c. 107 Pr.	8 May 1771
An Act for vesting certain Messuages in the Strand, in the County of Middlesex, Part of the Settled Estate of James Theobald Esquire in Trustees, to be conveyed to James Adam Esquire, and for laying out the Purchase Money in Lands, to be settled to the Uses to which the said Settled Estate do now stand limited.
Maddocks' Estate Act 1771	11 Geo. 3. c. 108 Pr.	8 May 1771
An Act for vesting the Copyhold Estate of Richard Maddock Gentleman deceased, situate at Norwood, in the County of Middlesex, in Trustees, to be sold towards discharging the Principal Money and Interest due upon a Mortgage thereof, and of certain Freehold Estates of the said Richard Maddock, in the County of Wilts.
Preston and Stratton (Gloucestershire) Inclosure Act 1771	11 Geo. 3. c. 109 Pr.	8 May 1771
An Act for dividing and enclosing the Open Common Meadows, Commons, and Downs, in the Parishes of Preston and Stratton, in the County of Gloucester.
Boston West Inclosure Act 1771	11 Geo. 3. c. 110 Pr.	8 May 1771
An Act for dividing and enclosing the Common Fen belonging to Boston West, in the County of Lincoln.
Skirbeck Inclosure Act 1771	11 Geo. 3. c. 111 Pr.	8 May 1771
An Act for dividing and enclosing the Common Fen belonging to Skirbeck Quarter, in the Parish of Skirbeck, in the County of Lincoln.
Brampton-en-le-Morthen Inclosure Act 1771	11 Geo. 3. c. 112 Pr.	8 May 1771
An Act for dividing and enclosing the Commons and Waste Grounds within the Township of Bramptonen-le-Morthen, in the West Riding of the County of York.
Naturalization of Carsten Dirs and Jacob Glostein Act 1771	11 Geo. 3. c. 113 Pr.	8 May 1771
An Act for naturalizing Carsten Dirs and Jacob Glostein.

=== Sources ===
- "11 George III - 1770-1". The Statutes at Large. Vol. 29. Cambridge, Printed by J. Bentham. 1762. pp. 1–252 – via Internet Archive.
- "11 George III - 1770-1". The Statutes at Large. Vol. 29. 1771. pp. 1–252 – via Google Books.
- Journals of the House of Commons. Vol. 33. London: His Majesty's Stationery Office. 1804. pp. 3–406 – via Google Books.
- Journals of the House of Commons. Vol. 33. London: His Majesty's Stationery Office. 1804. pp. 3–406 – via HathiTrust.
- Chronological Table of and Index to the Statutes. Vol. 1: To the End of the Session 59 Vict. Sess. 2 (1895) (13th ed.). London: Her Majesty's Stationery Office. 1896. pp. 127–128 – via Google Books.
- "Acts of the Parliament of Great Britain from 1771". legislation.gov.uk. The National Archives.

== See also ==
- List of acts of the Parliament of Great Britain
