= Patrick Duggan (bishop) =

Irish clergyman

The Most Reverend Patrick Duggan
- Bishop of Clonfert
- Province: Tuam
- Diocese: Clonfert
- Installed: 1872
- Term ended: 1896
- Predecessor: John Derry
- Successor: John Healy

Orders
- Ordination: 1841 (Priest)
- Consecration: 14 January 1872 (Bishop)

Personal details
- Born: 10 November 1813 Cummer, County Galway, Ireland
- Died: 15 August 1896 (aged 82) Ireland
- Buried: Glasnevin Cemetery, Dublin, Ireland
- Denomination: Roman Catholic Church
- Education: Maynooth College

Patrick Duggan (10 November 1813 – 15 August 1896) was an Irish Roman Catholic clergyman who served as the Bishop of Clonfert from 1872 until his death.

Duggan was born in Cummer, County Galway in 1813. He spent his early years on his mother's family farm at Carrownageehy, Milltown, County Galway. After finishing his studies at St Jarlath's College in Tuam, he matriculated in Maynooth College in 1833 and he was ordained to the priesthood on 5 June 1841. He was appointed curate to the parish of Kilmoylan and Cummer in County Galway, and later parish priest.

He was appointed Bishop of Clonfert on 10 September and by papal brief on 2 October 1871. He was consecrated bishop on 14 January 1872.

Duggan supported the Tenant Right League and the Home Rule movement. In the 1872 Galway County by-election, Duggan organized support for Captain (later Lieutenant-Colonel) John Philip Nolan who was favourably disposed towards tenant rights.

Nolan was elected but lost his seat on the grounds of undue clerical influence, and Duggan was brought to trial with others before the Court of Common Pleas, but the case collapsed and he was acquitted.

In 1884 he was requested by Michael Cusack and others to become the patron of the planned Gaelic Athletic Association. Duggan declined due to illness, and suggested Thomas Croke, Archbishop of Cashel and Emly, in his place.

He is buried in Glasnevin Cemetery in Dublin. Duggan Park, a Gaelic Athletic Association ground in Ballinasloe, County Galway, is named after him.

== See also ==
- Dugan
