= Bryan Cusack =

Irish politician (1881–1973)

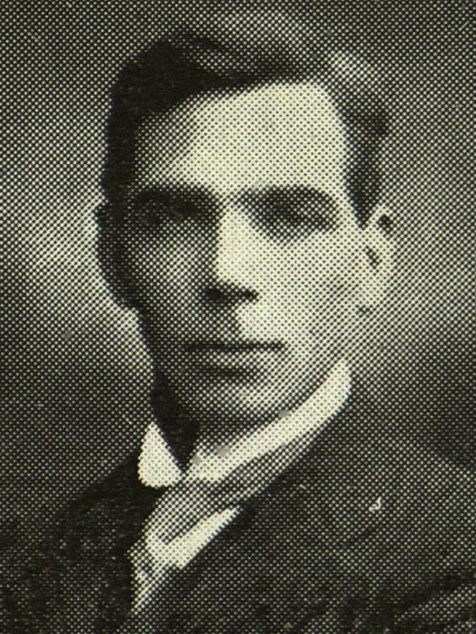
- Cusack, c. 1910s

Teachta Dála
- In office May 1921 – August 1923
- Constituency: Galway
- In office December 1918 – May 1921
- Constituency: Galway North

Personal details
- Born: Bernard Cusack; 2 August 1881 County Cavan, Ireland
- Died: 24 May 1973 (aged 91)
- Party: Sinn Féin
- Other political affiliations: Fianna Fáil
- Education: University College Galway

Bryan Cusack (2 August 1881 – 24 May 1973) was an Irish Sinn Féin politician and medical doctor.

Bernard Cusack was born in County Cavan in 1881, the son of draper Andrew Cusack and Catherine Dawson; at a young age his family moved to Granard, County Longford. In January 1916, in Dublin, he married Kathleen Keane.

He was elected as a Sinn Féin MP for Galway North at the 1918 general election. In January 1919, Sinn Féin MPs who had been elected in the Westminster elections of 1918 refused to recognise the Parliament of the United Kingdom and instead assembled at the Mansion House in Dublin as a revolutionary parliament called Dáil Éireann, though Cusack did not attend as he was in prison.

He re-elected unopposed as a Sinn Féin Teachta Dála (TD) for the Galway constituency at the 1921 general election. He opposed the Anglo-Irish Treaty and voted against it. He was re-elected as an anti-Treaty Sinn Féin TD for Galway at the 1922 general election but did not take his seat in Dáil Éireann. He did not contest the 1923 general election. He became a founder member of Fianna Fáil in 1926 and stood unsuccessfully for the party in Galway at the June 1927 general election. He did not contest any more elections and he resumed his medical career. He died in 1973 aged 91.

== See also ==
- List of members of the Oireachtas imprisoned during the Irish revolutionary period

Parliament of the United Kingdom
| Preceded by Richard Hazleton | Member of Parliament for Galway North; 1918–1922 | Constituency abolished |
Oireachtas
| New constituency | Teachta Dála for Galway North; 1918–1921 | Constituency abolished |

| Dáil | Election | Deputy (Party) | Deputy (Party) | Deputy (Party) | Deputy (Party) | Deputy (Party) | Deputy (Party) | Deputy (Party) | Deputy (Party) | Deputy (Party) |
|---|---|---|---|---|---|---|---|---|---|---|
| 2nd | 1921 | Liam Mellows (SF) | Bryan Cusack (SF) | Frank Fahy (SF) | Joseph Whelehan (SF) | Pádraic Ó Máille (SF) | George Nicolls (SF) | Patrick Hogan (SF) | 7 seats 1921–1923 | |
| 3rd | 1922 | Thomas O'Connell (Lab) | Bryan Cusack (AT-SF) | Frank Fahy (AT-SF) | Joseph Whelehan (PT-SF) | Pádraic Ó Máille (PT-SF) | George Nicolls (PT-SF) | Patrick Hogan (PT-SF) | 7 seats 1921–1923 | |
| 4th | 1923 | Thomas O'Connell (Lab) | Barney Mellows (Rep) | Frank Fahy (Rep) | Louis O'Dea (Rep) | Pádraic Ó Máille (CnaG) | George Nicolls (CnaG) | Patrick Hogan (CnaG) | Seán Broderick (CnaG) | James Cosgrave (Ind.) |
| 5th | 1927 (Jun) | Gilbert Lynch (Lab) | Thomas Powell (FF) | Frank Fahy (Note: Frank Fahy served as Ceann Comhairle from 9 March 1932.) (FF) | Seán Tubridy (FF) | Mark Killilea Snr (FF) | Martin McDonogh (CnaG) | Patrick Hogan (CnaG) | Seán Broderick (CnaG) | William Duffy (NL) |
| 6th | 1927 (Sep) | Stephen Jordan (FF) | Thomas Powell (FF) | Frank Fahy (FF) | Seán Tubridy (FF) | Mark Killilea Snr (FF) | Martin McDonogh (CnaG) | Patrick Hogan (CnaG) | Seán Broderick (CnaG) | Joseph Mongan (CnaG) |
| 7th | 1932 | Stephen Jordan (FF) | Thomas Powell (FF) | Frank Fahy (FF) | Patrick Beegan (FF) | Gerald Bartley (FF) | Fred McDonogh (CnaG) | Patrick Hogan (CnaG) | Seán Broderick (CnaG) | Joseph Mongan (CnaG) |
| 8th | 1933 | Stephen Jordan (FF) | Mark Killilea Snr (FF) | Frank Fahy (FF) | Patrick Beegan (FF) | Gerald Bartley (FF) | Séamus Keely (FF) | Patrick Hogan (CnaG) | Seán Broderick (CnaG) | Martin McDonogh (CnaG) |
| 8th | 1935 by-election | Stephen Jordan (FF) | Mark Killilea Snr (FF) | Frank Fahy (FF) | Patrick Beegan (FF) | Gerald Bartley (FF) | Séamus Keely (FF) | Patrick Hogan (CnaG) | Seán Broderick (CnaG) | Eamon Corbett (FF) |
| 8th | 1936 by-election | Stephen Jordan (FF) | Mark Killilea Snr (FF) | Frank Fahy (FF) | Patrick Beegan (FF) | Gerald Bartley (FF) | Séamus Keely (FF) | Martin Neilan (FF) | Seán Broderick (CnaG) | Eamon Corbett (FF) |
| 9th | 1937 | Constituency abolished. See Galway East and Galway West | | | | | | | | |
