= North Galway (UK Parliament constituency) =

UK parliamentary constituency in Ireland, 1885–1922

- Former county constituency for the House of Commons

1885–1922
- Seats: 1
- Created from: County Galway
- Replaced by: Galway

North Galway was a UK Parliament constituency in Ireland, returning one Member of Parliament from 1885 to 1922.

Prior to the 1885 United Kingdom general election the area was part of the County Galway constituency. From 1922, on the establishment of the Irish Free State, it was not represented in the UK Parliament.

== Boundaries ==
This constituency comprised the northern part of County Galway. The boundaries were redefined in 1918 to take account of the transfer of the district electoral division of Rosmoylan from County Galway to County Roscommon under the 1898 Local Government Act.

1885–1918: The baronies of Ballymoe, Clare and Dunmore.

1918–1922: The rural districts of Glennamaddy and Tuam.

== Members of Parliament ==
Election	Member	Party
1885	John Philip Nolan	Irish Parliamentary Party
1890	John Philip Nolan	Parnellite
1895	Denis Kilbride	Irish National Federation
1900	John Philip Nolan	Irish Parliamentary Party
1906	Thomas Higgins	Irish Parliamentary Party
1906 by-election	Richard Hazleton	Irish Parliamentary Party
1918	Bryan Cusack	Sinn Féin
1921	Constituency merged into Galway (Dáil constituency)	

== Elections ==
The elections in this constituency took place using the first past the post electoral system.

=== Elections in the 1880s ===
1885 general election: North Galway
Party	Candidate	Votes	%	±%
Irish Parliamentary	John Philip Nolan	Unopposed		
Irish Parliamentary win (new seat)				

1886 general election: North Galway
Party	Candidate	Votes	%	±%
Irish Parliamentary	John Philip Nolan	Unopposed		
Irish Parliamentary hold				

=== Elections in the 1890s ===
1892 general election: North Galway
Party	Candidate	Votes	%	±%
Irish National League	John Philip Nolan	2,040	55.3	N/A
Irish National Federation	Charles Kearns Deane Tanner	1,651	44.7	N/A
Majority		389	10.6	N/A
Turnout		3,691	44.3	N/A
Registered electors		8,328		
Irish National League gain from Irish Parliamentary		Swing	N/A	

1895 general election: North Galway
Party	Candidate	Votes	%	±%
Irish National Federation	Denis Kilbride	2,590	56.1	+11.4
Irish National League	John Philip Nolan	2,025	43.9	−11.4
Majority		565	12.2	N/A
Turnout		4,615	46.0	+1.7
Registered electors		10,034		
Irish National Federation gain from Irish National League		Swing	+11.4	

=== Elections in the 1900s ===
1900 general election: North Galway
Party	Candidate	Votes	%	±%
Irish Parliamentary	John Philip Nolan	Unopposed		
Irish Parliamentary hold				

1906 general election: North Galway
Party	Candidate	Votes	%	±%
Irish Parliamentary	Thomas Higgins	2,585	70.8	N/A
Ind. Nationalist	John Philip Nolan	1,064	29.2	N/A
Majority		1,521	41.6	N/A
Turnout		3,649	47.5	N/A
Registered electors		7,689		
Irish Parliamentary hold		Swing	N/A	

By-election, 1906: North Galway
Party	Candidate	Votes	%	±%
Irish Parliamentary	Richard Hazleton	Unopposed		
Irish Parliamentary hold				

=== Elections in the 1910s ===
January 1910 general election: North Galway
Party	Candidate	Votes	%	±%
Irish Parliamentary	Richard Hazleton	Unopposed		
Irish Parliamentary hold				

December 1910 general election: North Galway
Party	Candidate	Votes	%	±%
Irish Parliamentary	Richard Hazleton	Unopposed		
Irish Parliamentary hold				

By-election 1914: North Galway
Party	Candidate	Votes	%	±%
Irish Parliamentary	Richard Hazleton	Unopposed		
Irish Parliamentary hold				

1918 general election: Galway North
Party	Candidate	Votes	%	±%
Sinn Féin	Bryan Cusack	8,896	69.0	New
Irish Parliamentary	Thomas Sloyan	3,999	31.0	N/A
Majority		4,897	38.0	N/A
Turnout		12,885	61.3	N/A
Registered electors		21,036		
Sinn Féin gain from Irish Parliamentary		Swing	N/A	
