= Gunpowder Act 1860 =

Act of the Parliament of the United Kingdom

Gunpowder Act 1860 (Note: This short title was conferred on this act by section 3 of the Gunpowder Act Amendment Act 1862 (25 & 26 Vict. c. 98).)
- Act of Parliament
- Parliament of the United Kingdom
- Long title: An Act to amend the Law concerning the making, keeping, and Carriage of Gunpowder and Compositions of an explosive Nature, and concerning the Manufacture, Sale, and Use of Fireworks.
- Citation: 23 & 24 Vict. c. 139
- Introduced by: Sir George Lewis MP (Commons)
- Territorial extent: United Kingdom

Dates
- Royal assent: 28 August 1860
- Commencement: 31 August 1861 (Note: Section 1.)
- Repealed: 1 January 1876
Other legislation
Repeals/revokes	Fireworks Act 1697; Fireworks Act 1731; Gunpowder Act 1772
Amended by	Gunpowder Act Amendment Act 1862
Repealed by	Explosives Act 1875
Relates to	Keeping, etc., of Gunpowder Act 1771; Gunpowder Act 1772; Explosives Act 1875

Status: Repealed

Text of statute as originally enacted

The Gunpowder Act 1860 (23 & 24 Vict. c. 139), also known as the Gunpowder and Fireworks Act 1860, was an act of the Parliament of the United Kingdom that amended the law relating to the making, keeping and transport of gunpowder.

== Passage ==
Leave to bring in the Gunpowder, &c. Bill to the House of Commons was granted to the home secretary, Sir George Lewis MP and the under-secretary of state for the home department, George Clive MP on 2 July 1860.

The bill had its first reading in the House of Commons on 3 July 1860, presented by the home secretary, Sir George Lewis MP. The bill had its second reading in the House of Commons on 19 July 1860 and was committed to a committee of the whole house, which met and reported on 19 July 1860, with amendments. The amended bill was re-committed to a committee of the whole house, which met on 25 July 1860 and reported on 26 July 1860, with amendments. The amended bill had its third reading in the House of Commons on 28 July 1860 and passed, without amendments.

The bill had its first reading in the House of Lords on 30 July 1860. The bill had its second reading in the House of Lords on 9 August 1860 and was committed to a committee of the whole house, which upon the motion of the Lord President of the Council, Granville Leveson-Gower, 2nd Earl Granville, was directed to meet with urgency. The committee met on 16 August 1860 and reported on 17 August 1860, with amendments. The amended bill had its third reading in the House of Lords on 20 August 1860 and passed, with amendments.

The amended bill was considered and agreed to by the House of Commons on 23 August 1860.

The bill was granted royal assent on 28 August 1860.

== Provisions ==
=== Repealed enactments ===
Section 1 of the act repealed 3 enactments, listed in that section, effective from 31 August 1861, except for any offences or penalties incurred done under those enactments before repeal.

Citation	Short title	Extent of repeal
9 & 10 Will. 3. c. 7	Fireworks Act 1697	The whole act.
5 Geo. 2. c. 12 (I)	Fireworks Act 1731	The whole act.
12 Geo. 3. c. 61	Gunpowder Act 1772	The whole act.

== Subsequent developments ==
On 2 October 1874, two barges carrying gunpowder ignited and exploded in the Macclesfield Canal, which became known as the Macclesfield Bridge Disaster. Four people were killed and the bridge was destroyed. The disaster led to efforts to reform explosives law in the United Kingdom.

The whole act was repealed by section 122 of, and the fourth schedule to, the Explosives Act 1875 (38 & 39 Vict. c. 17), which came into force on 1 January 1876.
