= Explosives Act 1875 =

Act of the Parliament of the United Kingdom

Explosives Act 1875 (Note: Section 1.)
- Act of Parliament
- Parliament of the United Kingdom
- Long title: An Act to amend the Law with respect to manufacturing, keeping, selling, carrying, and importing Gunpowder, Nitro–glycerine, and other Explosive Substances.
- Citation: 38 & 39 Vict. c. 17
- Introduced by: R. A. Cross MP (Commons); Frederick Lygon, 6th Earl Beauchamp (Lords)
- Territorial extent: United Kingdom

Dates
- Royal assent: 14 June 1875
- Commencement: 1 January 1876 (Note: Section 2.)
Other legislation
| Amends | See § Repealed enactments |
| Repeals/revokes | See § Repealed enactments |
| Amended by | Statute Law Revision Act 1883; Summary Jurisdiction Act 1884; Interpretation Act 1889; Statute Law Revision (No. 2) Act 1893; Merchant Shipping Act 1894; Statute Law Revision Act 1898; Forgery Act 1913; Explosives Act 1923; Local Government Act 1933; Local Government (Scotland) Act 1947; Fireworks Act 1951; Police Act 1964; Police (Scotland) Act 1967; Courts Act 1971; Explosives Acts 1875 and 1923 etc. (Repeals and Modifications) Regulations 1974; Explosives (Age of Purchase etc.) Act 1976; Statute Law (Repeals) Act 1977; Explosives Act 1875 (Exemptions) Regulations 1979; Explosives Act 1875 etc. (Metrication and Miscellaneous Amendment) Regulations 1984; Statute Law (Repeals) Act 1986; Dangerous Substances in Harbour Areas Regulations 1987; Prevention of Terrorism (Temporary Provisions) Act 1989; Packaging of Explosives for Carriage Regulations 1991; Statute Law (Repeals) Act 1993; Local Government (Wales) Act 1994; Local Government etc. (Scotland) Act 1994; Merchant Shipping Act 1995; Northern Ireland (Emergency Provisions) Act 1996; Carriage of Dangerous Goods by Rail Regulations 1996; Police Act 1997; Fireworks Act 2003; Fire and Rescue Services Act 2004; Serious Organised Crime and Police Act 2005; Manufacture and Storage of Explosives Regulations 2005; Manufacture and Storage of Explosives Regulations (Northern Ireland) 2006; Health and Safety (Offences) Act 2008; Legislative Reform (Health and Safety Executive) Order 2008; Manufacture and Storage of Explosives (Amendment) Regulations (Northern Ireland) 2009; Pyrotechnic Articles (Safety) Regulations 2010; Crime and Courts Act 2013; Energy Act 2013; Explosives Regulations 2014; Acetylene Safety (England and Wales and Scotland) Regulations 2014; Pyrotechnic Articles (Safety) Regulations 2015 |
| Relates to | Gunpowder Act 1772 |

Status: Amended

History of passage through Parliament

Records of Parliamentary debate relating to the statute from Hansard

Text of statute as originally enacted

Revised text of statute as amended

Text of the Explosives Act 1875 as in force today (including any amendments) within the United Kingdom, from legislation.gov.uk.

The Explosives Act 1875 (38 & 39 Vict. c. 17) is an act of the Parliament of the United Kingdom that consolidated and amended statutes relating to explosives.

== Background ==
On 2 October 1874, a barge carrying gunpowder ignited and exploded near the Macclesfield Bridge on the Regent's Canal in London, which became known as the Macclesfield Bridge disaster. Four people were killed and the bridge was destroyed. The disaster led to efforts to reform explosives law in the United Kingdom.

== Passage ==
Leave to bring in the Explosive Substances Bill was granted to the Home Secretary, R. A. Cross MP, Sir Henry Selwin-Ibbetson MP, and William Henry Smith MP on 25 February 1875. The bill had its first reading in the House of Commons on 25 February 1875, presented by the home secretary, R. A. Cross MP. During debate, the home secretary described the key changes of the Bill, including:

- Requiring manufacturers to submit plans to the Home Secretary before seeking local licensing
- Introducing registration requirements for retailers
- Creating a tiered system for storage amounts:
  - Retailers: Up to 200 lbs
  - Personal use: Up to 30 lbs (no registration needed)
  - Consumer stores: 2 cwt to 2 tons
- Establishing government inspectors
- Granting factory owners more power to remove people causing safety risks

The bill had its second reading in the House of Commons on 16 March 1875 and was committed to a committee of the whole house, which met on 5 April 1875, 8 April 1875 and 12 April 1875. During debate, a proposed amendment by John Philip Nolan to change "grand jury cess" to "poor rates" for Ireland was defeated.

The consideration of the Bill was adjourned after the debate on 19 April 1875, and the committee met again on 23 April 1875, with amendments. The committee was discharged and the Bill was re-committed to a committee of the whole house on 27 April 1875 in respect of amended clause 110 of the Bill, which met and reported immediately on 27 April 1875, with amendments. The amended bill had its third reading in the House of Commons on 28 April 1875 and passed, without amendments.

The bill had its first reading in the House of Lords on 29 April 1875. The bill had its second reading in the House of Lords on 3 May 1875, introduced by Frederick Lygon, 6th Earl Beauchamp, and was committed to a committee of the whole house, which met and reported on 7 May 1875, with amendments. The amended bill had its third reading in the House of Lords on 13 May 1875 and passed, with amendments.

The amended bill was considered and agreed to by the House of Commons on 21 May 1875.

The bill was granted royal assent on 14 June 1875.

== Provisions ==
=== Repealed enactments ===
Section 122 of the act repealed 6 enactments, listed in fourth and fifth schedules to the act. Section 122 preserved existing securities, rates and charges and protected all pre-existing rights, actions and proceedings from being affected by the repeal.

| Citation | Short title | Title | Extent of repeal |
|---|---|---|---|
| 23 & 24 Vict. c. 139 | Gunpowder Act 1860 | An Act to amend the law concerning the making, keeping, and carriage of gunpowder and compositions of an explosive nature, and concerning the manufacture, sale, and use of fireworks. | The whole act. |
| 24 & 25 Vict. c. 130 | Gunpowder and Fireworks Act 1861 | An Act for amending an Act passed in the last session of Parliament to amend the law concerning the making, keeping, and carriage of gunpowder and compositions of an explosive nature, and concerning the manufacture, sale, and use of fireworks. | The whole act. |
| 25 & 26 Vict. c. 98 | Gunpowder Act Amendment Act 1862 | An Act for the amendment of an Act of the session of the twenty-third and twenty-fourth years of the reign of Her present Majesty, chapter one hundred and thirty-nine, intituled An Act to amend the law concerning the making, keeping, and carriage of gunpowder and compositions of an explosive nature, and concerning the manufacture, sale, and use of fireworks, and of an Act amending the last-mentioned Act. | The whole act. |
| 29 & 30 Vict. c. 69 | Carriage and Deposit of dangerous Goods Act 1866 | An Act for the amendment of the law with respect to the carriage and deposit of dangerous goods. | The whole act. |
| 32 & 33 Vict. c. 113 | Nitro Glycerine Act 1869 | An Act to prohibit for a limited time the importation and to restrict and regulate the carriage of nitro-glycerine. | The whole act. |
| 26 & 27 Vict. c. 65 | Volunteer Act 1863 | The Volunteer Act, 1863 | Section twenty-six from "all exemptions contained in the Gunpowder Act, 1860," inclusive, to the end of the section. |

== Subsequent developments ==
Courtenay Ilbert described the act as a Consolidation Act, given that the act, which amended the law with respect to explosives, also consolidated various enactments relating to that particular branch of law.

Section 42 of the act was repealed by section 745 of, and the twenty-second schedule to, the Merchant Shipping Act 1894 (57 & 58 Vict. c. 60), which came into force on 1 January 1895.

Section 99 of the act was repealed by section 1(1) of, and part XI of schedule 1 to, the Statute Law (Repeals) Act 1977, which came into force on 16 June 1977.

The act was partly repealed when the Manufacture and Storage of Explosives Regulations 2005 (SI 2005/1082) was brought into being but the inspection and licensing remained much the same.

According to the astronomer and broadcaster Patrick Moore, the act had a negative effect upon the development of rocketry in Britain:

The situation in the early part of 1975 was that many hundreds of satellites had been launched, mainly by Russia and America but also by a few other nations: Japan, China, Italy, France and Britain. It is sad to have to put Britain at the tail-end of the list, but we are still suffering from the after-effects of the restrictions imposed by the Explosives Act of 1875, which so effectively stopped the rocket pioneers here from carrying out practical experiments in the vital early period when von Braun and his colleagues were hard at work, first at their Rocket Flying Field near Berlin and then at Peenemünde.

— Patrick Moore, The Next Fifty Years in Space (1976)

== Bibliography ==
- Pellew, Jill H. (1974). "The Home Office and the Explosives Act of 1875". Victorian Studies. 18 (2). Indiana University Press: 175–194. ISSN 0042-5222. JSTOR 3826363.
- Leggett, Zach (2022). "Things That go 'Boom'… or Not? Defining Explosive Substances and Pyrotechnic Effects in Under the Explosive Substances Act 1883: R v Margelis [2021] EWCA Crim 1215". The Journal of Criminal Law. 86 (1): 46–50. doi:10.1177/00220183221079112. ISSN 0022-0183.
