= Richard Hazleton =

Irish nationalist politician

Member of Parliament for North Galway
- In office 28 February 1906 – 14 December 1918
- Preceded by: Thomas Higgins
- Succeeded by: Bryan Cusack

Member of Parliament for North Louth
- In office December 1910 – February 1911
- Preceded by: Tim Healy
- Succeeded by: Augustine Roche

Personal details
- Born: 5 December 1879
- Died: 26 January 1943 (aged 63)
- Party: Irish Parliamentary Party

Richard Hazleton (5 December 1879 – 26 January 1943) was an Irish nationalist politician of the Irish Parliamentary Party. He was Member of Parliament (MP) for North Galway from 1906 to 1918, taking his seat in the House of Commons of the United Kingdom of Great Britain and Ireland.

== Early life ==
He was born at Gresham Buildings, Dollymount, Dublin, on 5 December 1879, the son of Thomas Hazleton, a draper originally from Dungannon, County Tyrone, and Bridget Rose Ryan. He was educated at Blackrock College.

== Political career ==
He was one of the founders of the Young Ireland Branch of the United Irish League, which included Tom Kettle, Rory O'Connor and James Creed Meredith. He was seen as one of the Irish Party's most promising young members.

In 1901, he was elected a member of Blackrock Urban District Council and Rathdown Board of Guardians.

At the 1906 general election, the 25-year-old Hazelton contested the South Dublin constituency, where he lost by a wide margin to the Unionist Walter Long, a former Chief Secretary for Ireland. However, Thomas Higgins, the nationalist candidate in North Galway, had died the night before counting of the votes commenced and was elected posthumously, thereby creating an immediate vacancy. Hazelton was the only candidate nominated for the resulting by-election, and was therefore elected unopposed when nominations closed on 28 February.

At the next general election, in January 1910, Hazelton was returned unopposed in North Galway, but also stood in North Louth, where he narrowly failed to unseat the sitting MP Tim Healy, of the All-for-Ireland League. However, at the December 1910 election, he was again returned unopposed in North Galway, but also stood again in North Louth. This time he defeated Tim Healy in a bitter contest, by 2,509 votes to 2,021, but the North Louth result was subsequently overturned on petition, the reason cited being corrupt and defamatory conduct.

On 24 May 1914, he resigned his seat in Parliament, citing health and financial reasons. On 21 July 1914, he was re-elected to the same constituency in a by-election, in which he was the only candidate – a comeback to Parliament for the same constituency after 28 days.

He was honorary secretary to the Irish Parliamentary Party from 1907 to 1918.

He lost his seat in the 1918 general election, when he came to within a few hundred votes of retaining the Louth seat for the Irish Party.

He later emigrated to England In the 1923 British general election, he unsuccessfully stood as a candidate for the Liberal Party in the Rotherhithe constituency.

He worked as an engineer and, in 1925 was secretary to the Society of Technical Engineers. From 1928 until his death, he served as general secretary of the Institution of Production Engineers.

He was briefly engaged to the singer Margaret Burke Sheridan.

He died, after an operation, in London. He was buried in St Mary's Catholic Cemetery, Kensal Green.

Parliament of the United Kingdom
Preceded by Thomas Higgins	Member of Parliament for North Galway; 1906 – 1918	Succeeded by Bryan Cusack
Preceded by Tim Healy	Member of Parliament for North Louth; 1910 – 1911	Succeeded by Augustine Roche
