= Thomas Higgins (Irish politician) =

Irish politician

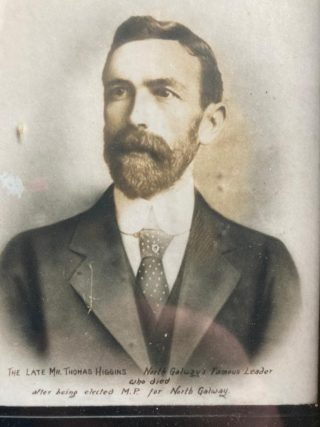
- Portrait of Thomas Higgins

Member of Parliament for North Galway
- In office 26 January 1906^{[a]}
- Preceded by: John Philip Nolan
- Succeeded by: Richard Hazleton

Personal details
- Born: Thomas Higgins; 27 November 1865 Moylough, County Galway
- Died: 26 January 1906 (aged 40) Tuam, County Galway
- Party: Irish Parliamentary Party
- a. Died prior to declaration of result.

Thomas Higgins (27 November 1865 − 26 January 1906) was an Irish nationalist politician, auctioneer and farmer, who as member of the Irish Parliamentary Party was posthumously declared elected Member of Parliament of the House of Commons of the United Kingdom of Great Britain and Ireland in 1906.

Higgins was born in Moylough, the son of Martin Higgins, a shopkeeper, and Catherine Kelly.

He was chairman of Tuam Board of Guardians and a member of Galway County Council, was selected as the Irish Parliamentary Party candidate by the United Irish League (UIL) convention on 5 January 1906 to contest the 1906 general election. He had been President of the constituency branch of the UIL since 1900.

Taken ill on the night of the election, 25 January 1906, he died as the result of a heart attack in Guy's Hotel, Tuam, at 1.30am the following morning.

As was widely expected, Higgins topped the poll at the election count, which was held later on the day of his death, beating the incumbent MP, John Philip Nolan, who had stood as an Independent Nationalist. Higgins, who received 2,685 votes (Nolan took 1,064), was posthumously declared elected by the county sheriff, the returning officer.

The remarkable circumstances surrounding the election led the Irish Independent to comment that "candidates have died before the actual election, but we doubt if ever such a case as the present has occurred before, where a candidate has died after the poll has been taken and before the result has been declared".

This circumstance of a candidate winning a seat posthumously occurred again to Noel Skelton in 1935, and to Sir Edward Taswell Campbell and Leslie Pym in 1945; however, all of them were candidates for re-election. Thomas Higgins is the only MP to be newly elected posthumously.

Higgins, who was married, was 40 when he died.

== See also ==
- List of United Kingdom MPs with the shortest service

Parliament of the United Kingdom
Preceded by John Philip Nolan	MP for North Galway; 26 January 1906 posthumously	Succeeded by Richard Hazleton
