= Fireworks Act 2003 =

British statute

Fireworks Act 2003 (Note: Section 19(1).)
- Act of Parliament
- Parliament of the United Kingdom
- Long title: An Act to make provision about fireworks and other explosives
- Citation: 2003 c. 22
- Territorial extent: England and Wales; Scotland; (Note: Section 19(2).)

Dates
- Royal assent: 18 September 2003
- Commencement: Various (Note: Section 18.)
Other legislation
Amends	Explosives Act 1875; Health and Safety at Work etc. Act 1974; Road Traffic Act 1974; Roads (Scotland) Act 1984; Explosives Act 1875 etc. (Metrication and Miscellaneous Amendment) Regulations 1984; Consumer Protection Act 1987; Criminal Justice and Police Act 2001; Enterprise Act 2002
Repeals/revokes	Explosives (Age of Purchase &c.) Act 1976
Amended by	Police, Public Order and Criminal Justice (Scotland) Act 2006; Legislative Reform (Health and Safety Executive) Order 2008; Explosives Regulations 2014; Consumer Rights Act 2015; Criminal Justice (Scotland) Act 2016

Status: Amended

Text of statute as originally enacted

Revised text of statute as amended

The Fireworks Act 2003 (c. 22) is an act of the Parliament of the United Kingdom, granted royal assent on 18 September 2003.

== Provisions ==
It was the first such act since the Fireworks Act 1951 (14 & 15 Geo. 6. c. 58) and Fireworks Act 1964 and is notable as the enabling legislation for the Fireworks Regulations 2004. It wholly or partly repealed six acts from between 1974 and 2001 and amended a sentence of the Explosives Act 1875, with the latter's provision (section 80) against throwing or discharging a firework in a street or public place remaining in force until the present day.

== Fireworks Regulations 2004 ==
Fireworks Regulations 2004
- Statutory Instrument
- Parliament of the United Kingdom
- Citation: SI 2004/1836

Dates
- Made: 14 July 2004
- Laid before Parliament: 16 July 2004
- Commencement: 7 August 2004
Other legislation
Repeals/revokes	Fireworks Regulations 2003
Made under	Consumer Protection Act 1987; Fireworks Act 2003

Text of statute as originally enacted

Text of the Fireworks Regulations 2004 as in force today (including any amendments) within the United Kingdom, from legislation.gov.uk.

The Fireworks Regulations 2004 (SI 2004/1836) impose restrictions on the importation, supply and possession of fireworks in England, Wales and Scotland. The regulations were made under the act. In particular, the regulations introduced the following measures:

- a ban on the use of fireworks late at night (after 11 pm) – except for New Year's Eve, the night of Diwali and the first day of Chinese New Year – where fireworks may be used until 1 am (on Guy Fawkes Night fireworks may be used until 12 midnight);
- a ban on the possession of category 4 fireworks by non-professionals;
- a ban on persons under the age of 18 possessing fireworks in public places;
- a ban on the sale of fireworks outside certain "traditional" or minority-cultural periods (such as those listed in the first bullet), unless suppliers are licensed; and,
- a requirement that importers of fireworks notify HM Revenue and Customs of the storage destination of their imports - the intention being to prevent illegal distribution and dangerous storage.

Some of these regulations are not applicable to Scotland, and none of them applies in Northern Ireland, which has its own, stricter regulations in place. The regulations revoked the Fireworks Regulations 2003 (SI 2003/3085) which introduced, as emergency measures, prohibitions on the possession of fireworks by those under the age of 18 and the possession of category 4 fireworks by non-professionals. UK emergency regulations are usually temporary in nature – lasting no more than one year after the date of coming into force.

The Department for Business and Trade (DBT) is responsible for fireworks policy.

== Further developments ==
The first person to be charged under the act in Scotland was in 2004.

== Criticism ==
The act and regulations have been criticised by multiple MPs, MSPs, and MSs for not being strict enough.
