= Gunpowder Act 1772 =

Act of the Parliament of Great Britain

- Act of Parliament
- Parliament of Great Britain
- Long title: An Act to regulate the Making, Keeping, and Carriage of Gunpowder within Great Britain, and to repeal the Laws heretofore made for any of those Purposes.
- Citation: 12 Geo. 3. c. 61
- Territorial extent: Great Britain

Dates
- Royal assent: 3 June 1772
- Commencement: 1 July 1772 (Note: Section 31.)
- Repealed: 31 August 1861

Other legislation
- Repeals/revokes: Keeping, etc., of Gunpowder Act 1771
- Amended by: Gunpowder in Mersey Act 1851
- Repealed by: Gunpowder Act 1860
- Relates to: Keeping, etc., of Gunpowder Act 1771; Gunpowder Act 1860; Explosives Act 1875

Status: Repealed

Text of statute as originally enacted

The Gunpowder Act 1772 (12 Geo. 3. c. 61) was an act of the Parliament of Great Britain that consolidated all acts relating to the making, keeping and transport of gunpowder.

== Background ==
In 1771, the Keeping, etc., of Gunpowder Act 1771 (11 Geo. 3. c. 35) was passed, which consolidated all laws relating to the keeping and transport of gunpowder.

== Provisions ==
Section 31 of the act repealed the Keeping, etc., of Gunpowder Act 1771 (11 Geo. 3 c. 35), as well as "all other statutes relating to the keeping and carriage of gunpowder", effective from 1 July 1772.

== Subsequent developments ==
The Select Committee on Temporary Laws described this act as a Consolidation Act.

The whole act was repealed by section 1 of the Gunpowder Act 1860 (23 & 24 Vict. c. 139), except as to any offence or penalty incurred, which would remain as if the act had not been repealed.
