= Explosives Act 1957 =

Federal Legislative Council of the Federation of Malaya
- Long title: An Act relating to the manufacture, use, sale, storage, transport, import and export of explosives.
- Citation: Act 207 (Originally enacted as Ordinance No. 40 of 1957)
- Territorial extent: Throughout Malaysia
- Passed by: Federal Legislative Council
- Passed: 11 July 1957
- Assented to: 3 August 1957 (Rulers of the Malay States); 8 August 1957 (High Commissioner of Malaya)
- Effective: Peninsular Malaysia — 15 February 1961 [L.N. 44/1961] Sabah and Sarawak — 1 September 1977 [P.U. (A) 260/1977]

Legislative history
- First reading: 10 July 1957
- Second reading: 11 July 1957
- Third reading: 11 July 1957

Repeals
- The Explosive Substances Enactment [F.M.S. Cap. 49] The Explosives Enactment [F.M.S. Cap. 200] The Explosives Enactment [Johore Enactment No. 56] Enactment No. 35 (Explosives) [Kedah Enactment No. 3 of 1333] The Arms and Explosives Enactment 1938 [Kelantan Enactment No. 4 of 1938] The Explosives Enactment [Perlis Enactment No. 6 of 1356] The Explosives Enactment 1356 [Trengganu No. 47 of 1356] The Arms and Explosives Ordinance [S.S. Cap. 196] The Explosives Substances Ordinance [S.S. Cap. 197] The Firearms and Explosives Ordinance [Sabah No. 17 of 1956] The Arms and Explosives Ordinance [Sarawak Cap. 135]

Amended by
- Pending Laws Validation (Explosives Ordinance 1957) Order, 1961 [L.N. 44/1961] Police Act 1967 (definitions of “Chief Police Officer”, “gazetted police officer”), 13(1), 14, 15(1), 16(1), (4) [Act 41/1967] Explosives (Amendment) Act 1974 [Act A267] Malayan Currency (Ringgit) Act 1975 [Act 160] Arms and Explosives (Extension) Order 1977 [P.U. (A) 260/1977]
- Status: In force

The Explosives Act 1957 (Malay: Akta Bahan Letupan 1957), is a Malaysian law on the manufacture, use, sale, storage, transport, import and export of explosives.

== Structure ==
The Explosives Act 1957, in its current form (1 January 2006), consists of 3 Parts containing 28 sections and 1 schedule (including 5 amendments).

- Section 1: Short title
- Section 2: Interpretation
- Section 3: Extension of definition of explosive to other explosive substances
- Section 4: Power to prohibit the manufacture, possession or importation of specially dangerous explosives
- Section 5: Dangerous acts
- Section 6: Penalty for causing explosion likely to endanger life or property
- Section 7: Penalty for attempt to cause explosion, or for making or keeping explosive with intent to endanger life or property
- Section 8: Penalty for making or possessing explosives under suspicious circumstances
- Section 9: Search for explosives under warrant
- Section 10: Search warrant against persons
- Section 11: Entry and search by Magistrate, etc.
- Section 12: Power to stop and search for explosive in the street
- Section 13: Entry on place where explosive is used
- Section 14: Production of licence and accounting for explosives
- Section 15: Arrest without warrant
- Section 16: Abetment and attempt
- Section 17: Forfeiture of explosives
- Section 18: Seizure and sale of vessels
- Section 19: Rewards to informers
- Section 20: Liability of principal for offences committed by agent, etc.
- Section 21: Where licensee under disability
- Section 22: Presumptions
- Section 23: Notice of accidents
- Section 24: Enquiry into accidents
- Section 25: Minister may authorize magazines or hulks
- Section 26: Regulations
- Section 27: Non-application in respect of Government, etc.
- Section 28: Repeal and saving
- Schedule
