= William Le Poer Trench =

Anglo-Irish politician and British army officer

Colonel The Hon. William Le Poer Trench CVO, JP (17 June 1837 – 16 September 1920) was an Anglo-Irish politician and British army officer.

He was the third son of William Trench, 3rd Earl of Clancarty and Lady Sarah Juliana Butler.

He married Harriet Maria Georgina Martins, daughter of Sir William Martins, on 21 April 1864.

He fought in the Second Opium War between 1857 and 1858, commanding a ladder company at the capture of Guangzhou and Nankow, and was mentioned in despatches. He gained the rank of Colonel in the service of the Royal Engineers.

The 1868 Ordnance Survey 6 inch map of Middlesex (sheet VI) credits him with surveying the county between 1863 and 1866.

Between 1872 and 1874, he was Member of Parliament (MP) for County Galway, having unseated the elected MP, John Philip Nolan, on petition; the case was one of the most controversial Irish cases of its time and permanently damaged the reputation of the judge, William Keogh.

In the 1878 Kelly's Directory for Surrey he is listed as being resident at The Grove, Church Road, Upper Norwood.

He held the office of Justice of the Peace for Westminster, London, Buckinghamshire, and Middlesex. He was made a Commander of the Royal Victorian Order in 1912.

Parliament of the United Kingdom
Preceded by William Henry Gregory; Mitchell Henry	Member of Parliament for County Galway; 1872–1874; With: Mitchell Henry	Succeeded by John Philip Nolan; Mitchell Henry
