= John Philip Nolan =

Irish politician

Lieutenant-Colonel John Philip Nolan (1838 – 30 January 1912) was an Irish nationalist landowner and Member of Parliament (MP) in the House of Commons of the United Kingdom of Great Britain and Ireland and as member of the Irish Parliamentary Party represented County Galway (1872–1885) and Galway North (1885–1895), (1900–1906).

He was the eldest son of John Nolan, Justice of the Peace, of Ballinderry, Tuam, and Mary Anne, Walter Nolan, of Loughboy. He received his education at Clongowes Wood College, Stonyhurst, Trinity College Dublin, the Staff College and Woolwich. He entered the British Royal Artillery in 1857 and served throughout the 1868 Expedition to Abyssinia. As adjutant to Colonel Milward, he was present at the capture of Amba Mariam (then known as Magdala) and was mentioned in despatches. He was awarded the Abyssinian War Medal and retired from the Army with the rank of lieutenant-colonel in 1881.

Nolan became involved in the nascent home rule campaign of the Home Rule League. On 8 February 1872 Nolan was elected MP for County Galway in a by-election, defeating by a large majority the Conservative William Le Poer Trench. Of the 4,686 available electors, who were chiefly Catholic, 2,823 voted for Nolan and 658 for Trench.

Trench appealed the result, claiming on petition that there was widespread intimidation during the election campaign. The local Catholic bishops and clergy had strongly supported Nolan, chiefly because the family of his opponent, a Captain Trench, was active in proselytism. The trial of the County Galway Election Petition began, before Judge William Keogh, on 1 April and ended on 21 May 1872.

Judge Keogh found that Capt. Nolan had been elected by the undue influence and intimidation and in his report stated that he found 36 persons guilty of undue influence and intimidation, including John MacHale, the Archbishop of Tuam, the Bishop of Clonfert, Patrick Duggan, and the Bishop of Galway, John McEvilly, and twenty nine named priests, such intimidation being in some cases exercised in the very churches. As a result, Captain Nolan was unseated on 13 June, the seat going to Captain Trench. The judgement caused an uproar; the judge was threatened with removal from the bench and his reputation never recovered.

Nolan retook the seat at the 1874 election. He remained MP after the 1885 constituency reforms as MP for Galway North until 1895.

When the Irish Parliamentary Party split over Charles Stewart Parnell's long-term family relationship with Katharine O'Shea, the separated wife of a fellow MP, Nolan sided with his deposed leader and seconded the motion to retain Parnell as chairman at the ill-fated party meeting in Committee Room 15 of the House of Commons. He went on to become whip of the pro-Parnellite rump of the split party, the Irish National League. He lost the Galway North seat to an Anti-Parnellite, Denis Kilbride, in 1895 and stood unsuccessfully as a Parnellite for Louth South in 1896. He was re-elected unopposed at Galway North after the reunification of the Parliamentary Party in 1900. But at the National Convention of 8 January 1902 he was expelled from the United Irish League on the ground of his 'harsh and unparalleled oppression of his Mweenish tenantry'. In 1906 he stood as an independent Nationalist and lost the Galway North seat for the last time.

== Writings ==
- "Galway Castles and Owners in 1574", Journal of the Galway Archaeological and Historical Society 1:2 (1900–1901), pp. 109–123
- “The Castles of Clare Barony. The thirty-four De Burgo Castles in the Barony of Clare”, Journal of the Galway Archaeological and Historical Society 1:1 (1900–1901), pp. 11–48

Parliament of the United Kingdom
Preceded by William Henry Gregory; Mitchell Henry	Member of Parliament for County Galway; 1872; With: Mitchell Henry	Succeeded by Mitchell Henry; William Le Poer Trench
Preceded by William Le Poer Trench; Mitchell Henry	Member of Parliament for County Galway; 1874–1885; With: Mitchell Henry	constituency abolished
New constituency	Member of Parliament for Galway North; 1885–1895	Succeeded by Denis Kilbride
Preceded by Denis Kilbride	Member of Parliament for Galway North; 1900–1906	Succeeded by Thomas Higgins
