= Bonar Law =

Prime Minister of the United Kingdom from 1922 to 1923

The Right Honourable Bonar Law
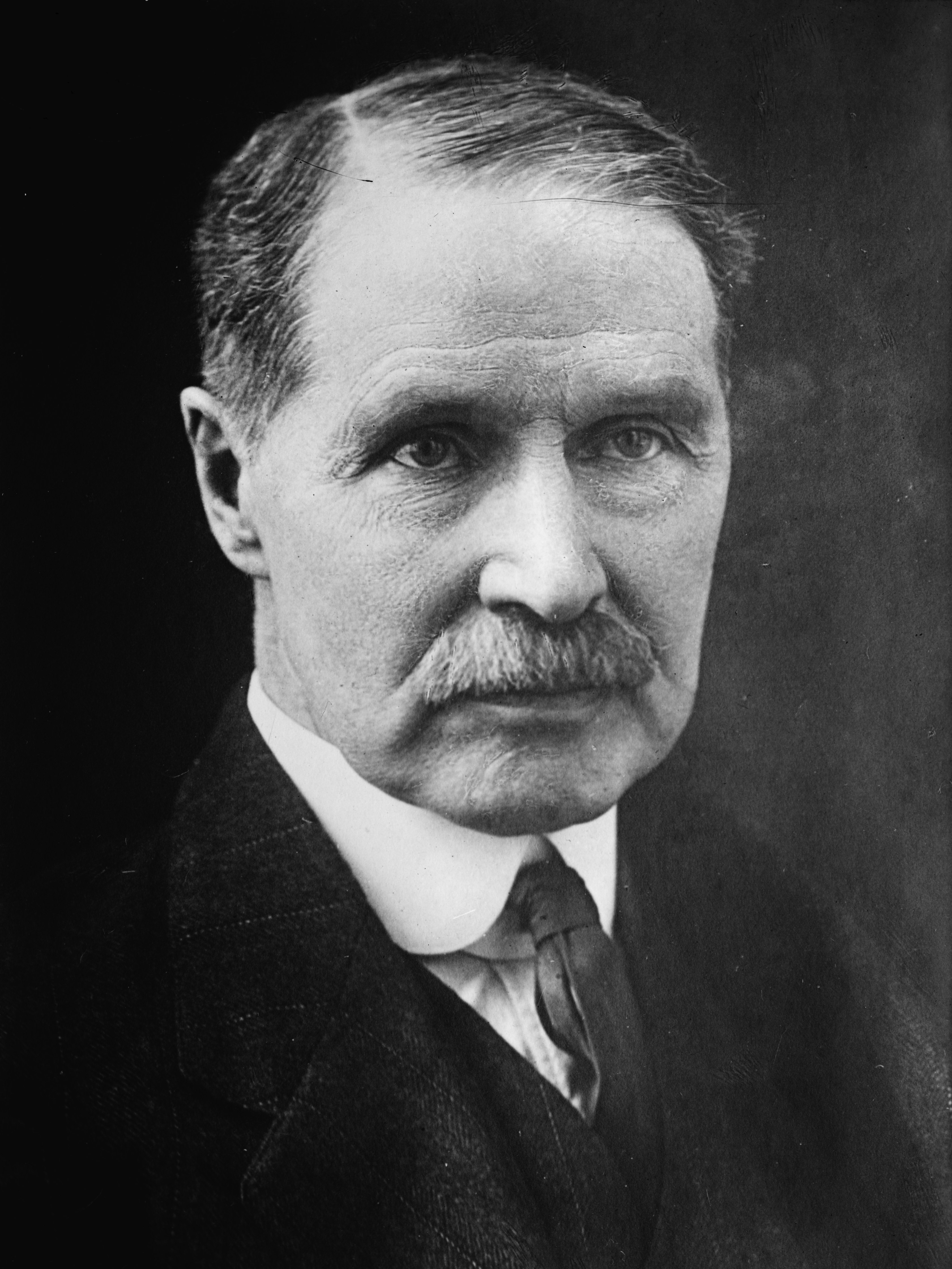
- Law in 1923

Prime Minister of the United Kingdom
- In office 23 October 1922 – 20 May 1923
- Monarch: George V
- Preceded by: David Lloyd George
- Succeeded by: Stanley Baldwin
Senior positions
Leader of the Conservative Party
In office 23 October 1922 – 28 May 1923
Chairman	Sir George Younger, Bt
Preceded by	Austen Chamberlain
Succeeded by	Stanley Baldwin
In office 13 November 1911 – 21 March 1921
Chairman	Arthur Steel-Maitland; Sir George Younger, Bt
Preceded by	Arthur Balfour
Succeeded by	Austen Chamberlain
Leader of the Opposition
In office 13 November 1911 – 25 May 1915
Monarch	George V
Prime Minister	H. H. Asquith
Preceded by	Arthur Balfour
Succeeded by	Sir Edward Carson^{[a]}
Ministerial offices
Leader of the House of Commons
In office 23 October 1922 – 20 May 1923
Prime Minister	Himself
Preceded by	Austen Chamberlain
Succeeded by	Stanley Baldwin
In office 10 December 1916 – 23 March 1921
Prime Minister	David Lloyd George
Preceded by	H. H. Asquith
Succeeded by	Austen Chamberlain
Lord Keeper of the Privy Seal
In office 10 January 1919 – 1 April 1921
Prime Minister	David Lloyd George
Preceded by	The Earl of Crawford
Succeeded by	Austen Chamberlain
Chancellor of the Exchequer
In office 10 December 1916 – 10 January 1919
Prime Minister	David Lloyd George
Preceded by	Reginald McKenna
Succeeded by	Austen Chamberlain
Secretary of State for the Colonies
In office 25 May 1915 – 10 December 1916
Prime Minister	H. H. Asquith
Preceded by	Lewis Harcourt
Succeeded by	Walter Long
Parliamentary Secretary to the Board of Trade
In office 11 July 1902 – 5 December 1905
Prime Minister	Arthur Balfour
Preceded by	The Earl of Dudley
Succeeded by	Hudson Kearley

Member of Parliament
- In office 28 March 1911 – 30 October 1923
- Preceded by: Thomas Myles Sandys
- Succeeded by: William Alexander
- Constituency: Bootle (1911–1918); Glasgow Central (1918–1923)
- In office 16 May 1906 – 20 December 1910
- Preceded by: Frederick Rutherfoord Harris
- Succeeded by: Frederick Hall
- Constituency: Dulwich
- In office 25 October 1900 – 13 January 1906
- Preceded by: Andrew Dryburgh Provand
- Succeeded by: George Nicoll Barnes
- Constituency: Glasgow Blackfriars

Personal details
- Born: Andrew Bonar Law; 16 September 1858 Kingston, Colony of New Brunswick^{[b]}
- Died: 30 October 1923 (aged 65) London, Middlesex, England
- Resting place: Westminster Abbey
- Party: Conservative
- Other political affiliations: Unionist
- Spouse: Annie Robley (m. 1891; died 1909)
- Children: 6, including Richard
- Education: The High School of Glasgow
- Profession: Iron merchant
- a. Office vacant from 25 May 1915 to 19 October 1915; b. Now Rexton, New Brunswick, Canada.

Andrew Bonar Law (/ˌbɒnə ˈlɔː/; 16 September 1858 – 30 October 1923) was a British Conservative politician who was Prime Minister of the United Kingdom from 1922 to 1923. He was the first prime minister born outside of Britain or Ireland, and the shortest-serving British prime minister of the 20th century.

Law was born in the British colony of New Brunswick (now a Canadian province). He was of Scottish and Ulster Scots descent and moved to Scotland in 1870. He left school aged sixteen to work in the iron industry, becoming a wealthy man by the age of thirty. He entered the House of Commons at the 1900 general election at age 42, relatively late in life for a front-rank politician; he was made a junior minister, Parliamentary Secretary to the Board of Trade, in 1902. Law joined the Shadow Cabinet in opposition after the 1906 general election. In 1911, he was appointed a Privy Councillor, before standing for the vacant party leadership. Despite never having served in the Cabinet and trailing third after Walter Long and Austen Chamberlain, Law became leader when the two front-runners withdrew rather than risk a draw splitting the party.

As Leader of the Conservative Party and Leader of the Opposition, Law focused his attentions in favour of tariff reform and against Irish Home Rule. His campaigning helped turn Liberal attempts to pass the Third Home Rule Bill into a three-year struggle eventually halted by the start of World War I, with much argument over the status of the six counties in Ulster which would later become Northern Ireland, four of which were predominantly Protestant.

Law first held Cabinet office as Secretary of State for the Colonies in H. H. Asquith's Coalition Government (May 1915 – December 1916). Upon Asquith's fall from power he declined to form a government, instead becoming Chancellor of the Exchequer in David Lloyd George's Coalition Government. He resigned on grounds of ill health early in 1921. In October 1922, with Lloyd George's Coalition having become unpopular with the Conservatives, he wrote a letter to the press giving only lukewarm support to the Government's actions over Chanak. After Conservative MPs voted to end the Coalition, he again became party leader and, this time, prime minister. Bonar Law won a clear majority at the 1922 general election, and his brief premiership saw negotiation with the United States over Britain's war loans. Seriously ill with throat cancer, Law resigned in May 1923, and died later that year. He was the fourth shortest-serving prime minister of the United Kingdom (211 days in office).

== Early life and education ==
Andrew Bonar Law was born on 16 September 1858 in Kingston (now Five Rivers), New Brunswick, to the Reverend James Law, a minister of the Free Church of Scotland, and his wife Eliza Kidston Law. He was of Scottish and Irish (mainly Ulster Scots) ancestry. At the time of his birth, New Brunswick was still a separate colony, as the Canadian Confederation was not formed until 1867.

His mother originally wanted to name him after Robert Murray McCheyne, a preacher she greatly admired, but as his older brother was already called Robert, he was instead named after Andrew Bonar, a biographer of McCheyne. Throughout his life he was always called Bonar by his family and close friends, never Andrew. He originally signed his name as A. B. Law, changing to A. Bonar Law in his thirties. He was referred to as Bonar Law by the public.

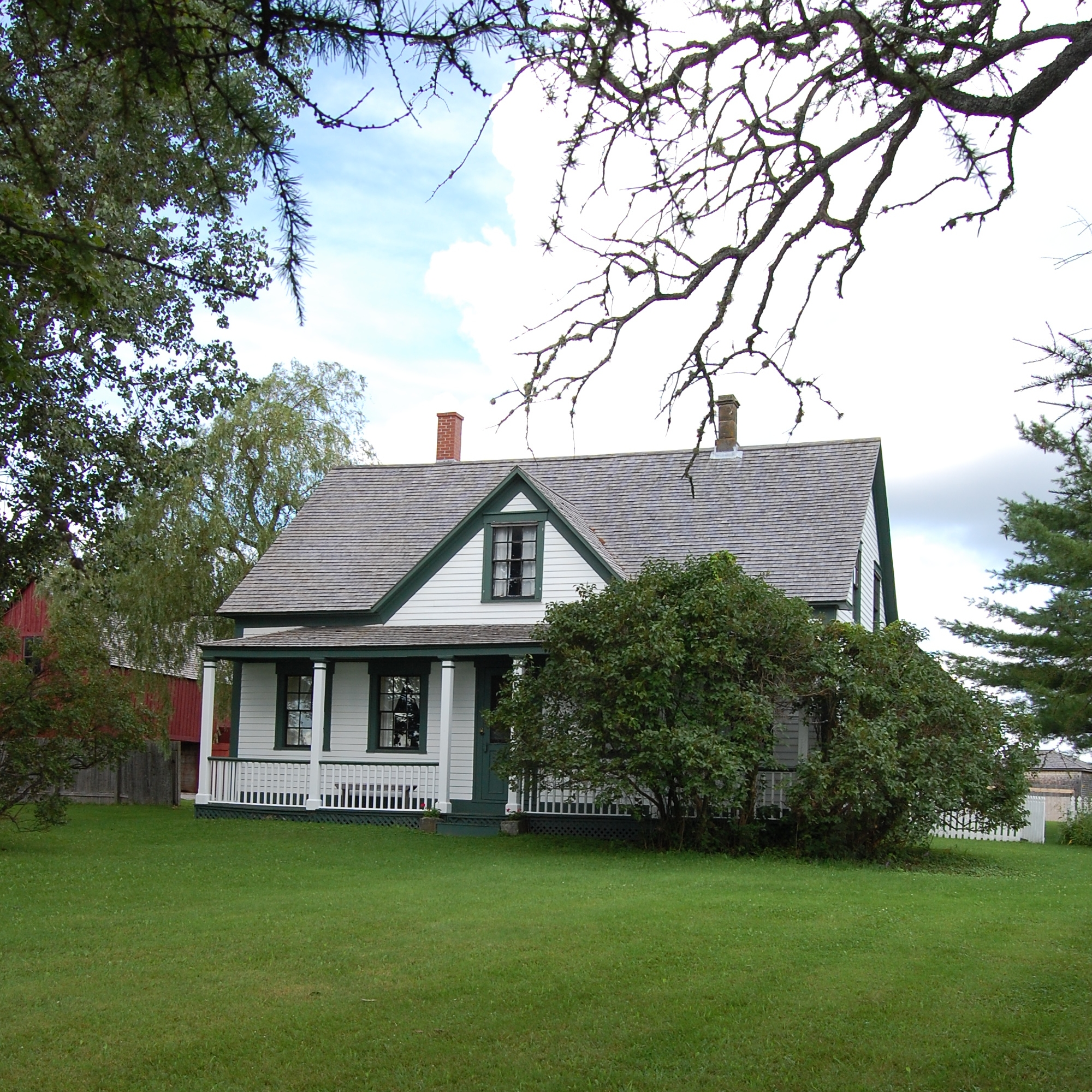
Bonar Law's home in New Brunswick where he lived until the age of twelve. The house overlooks the Richibucto River

James Law was the minister for several isolated townships, and had to travel between them by horse, boat and on foot. To supplement the family income, he bought a small farm on the Richibucto River, which Bonar helped tend along with his brothers Robert, William and John, and his sister Mary. Studying at the local village school, Law did well at his studies, and it is here that he was first noted for his excellent memory. After Eliza Law died in 1861, her sister Janet travelled to New Brunswick from her home in Scotland to look after the Law children. When James Law remarried in 1870, his new wife took over Janet's duties, and Janet decided to return home to Scotland. She suggested that Bonar Law should go with her, as the Kidston family were wealthier and better connected than the Laws, and Bonar would have a more privileged upbringing. Both James and Bonar accepted this, Bonar's father then accompanied him on his move to his aunt's. Bonar would never return to Kingston.

Law went to live at Janet's house in Helensburgh, near Glasgow. Her brothers Charles, Richard and William were partners in the family merchant bank Kidston & Sons, and as only one of them had married (and produced no heir) it was generally accepted that Law would inherit the firm, or at least play a role in its management when he was older. Immediately upon arriving from Kingston, Law began attending Gilbertfield House School, a preparatory school in Hamilton. In 1873, aged fourteen, he transferred to the High School of Glasgow, where with his good memory he showed a talent for languages, excelling in Greek, German and French. During this period, he first began to play chess – he would carry a board on the train between Helensburgh and Glasgow, challenging other commuters to matches. He eventually became a very good amateur player, and competed with internationally renowned chess masters. Despite his good academic record, it became obvious at Glasgow that he was better suited to business than to university, and when he was sixteen, Law left school to become a clerk at Kidston & Sons.

== Business career ==
At Kidston & Sons, Law received a nominal salary, on the understanding that he would gain a "commercial education" from working there that would serve him well as a businessman. In 1885 the Kidston brothers decided to retire, and agreed to merge the firm with the Clydesdale Bank.

The merger would have left Law without a job and with poor career-prospects, but the retiring brothers found him a job with William Jacks, an iron merchant who had started pursuing a parliamentary career. The Kidston brothers lent Law the money to buy a partnership in Jacks' firm, and with Jacks himself no longer playing an active part in the company, Law effectively became the managing partner. Working long hours (and insisting that his employees did likewise), Law turned the firm into one of the most profitable iron merchants in the Glaswegian and Scottish markets.

During this period Law became a "self-improver"; despite his lack of formal university education, Law sought to test his intellect, attending lectures given at Glasgow University and joining the Glasgow Parliamentary Debating Association, which adhered as closely as possible to the layout of the real Parliament of the United Kingdom. This helped Law hone the skills that served him so well in the political arena.

By the time he was thirty, Law had established himself as a successful businessman. He had time to devote to more leisurely pursuits. He remained an avid chess player, whom Andrew Harley called "a strong player, touching first-class amateur level, which he had attained by practice at the Glasgow Club in earlier days". Law also worked with the Parliamentary Debating Association, and took up golf, tennis and walking. In 1888 he moved out of the Kidston household and set up his own home at Seabank, with his sister Mary (who had earlier come over from Canada) acting as the housekeeper.

In 1890, Law met Annie Pitcairn Robley, the 24-year-old daughter of a Glaswegian merchant, Harrington Robley. They quickly fell in love, and married on 24 March 1891. Little is known of Law's wife, as most of her letters have been lost. It is known that she was much liked in both Glasgow and London, and that her death in 1909 hit Law hard; despite his relatively young age and prosperous career, he never remarried. The couple had six children: James Kidston (1893–1917), Isabel Harrington (1895–1969), Charles John (1897–1917), Harrington (1899–1958), Richard Kidston (1901–1980), and Catherine Edith (1905–1992).

Law's second son, Charlie, a lieutenant in the King's Own Scottish Borderers, was killed at the Second Battle of Gaza in April 1917. His eldest son, James, a captain in the Royal Fusiliers, was shot down and killed on 21 September 1917. The deaths made Law even more melancholy and depressed than before. The youngest son, Richard, later served as a Conservative MP and minister. Isabel married Sir Frederick Sykes (in the early years of World War I, she had been engaged for a time to the Australian war correspondent Keith Murdoch) and Catherine married, firstly, Kent Colwell and, much later, in 1961, The 1st Baron Archibald.

== Entry into politics ==
In 1897, Law was asked to become the Conservative Party candidate for the parliamentary seat of Glasgow Bridgeton. Soon after he was offered another seat, this one in Glasgow Blackfriars and Hutchesontown, which he took instead of Glasgow Bridgeton. Blackfriars was not a seat with high prospects attached; a working-class area, it had returned Liberal Party MPs since it was created in 1884, and the incumbent, Andrew Provand, was highly popular. Although the election was not due until 1902, the events of the Second Boer War forced the Conservative government to call a general election in 1900, later known as the khaki election. The campaign was unpleasant for both sides, with anti- and pro-war campaigners fighting vociferously, but Law distinguished himself with his oratory and wit. When the results came in on 4 October, Law was returned to Parliament with a majority of 1,000, overturning Provand's majority of 381. He immediately ended his active work at Jacks and Company (although he retained his directorship) and moved to London.

Law initially became frustrated with the slow speed of Parliament compared to the rapid pace of the Glasgow iron market, and Austen Chamberlain recalled him saying to Chamberlain that "it was very well for men who, like myself had been able to enter the House of Commons young to adapt to a Parliamentary career, but if he had known what the House of Commons was he would never had entered at this stage". He soon learnt to be patient, however, and on 18 February 1901 made his maiden speech. Replying to anti-Boer War MPs, including David Lloyd George, Law used his excellent memory to quote sections of Hansard back to the opposition. These sections contained their previous speeches which supported and commended the policies which they now denounced. Although lasting only fifteen minutes and not a crowd- or press-pleaser (like the maiden speeches of F. E. Smith or Winston Churchill), his speech attracted the attention of the Conservative Party leaders.

== Tariff reform ==
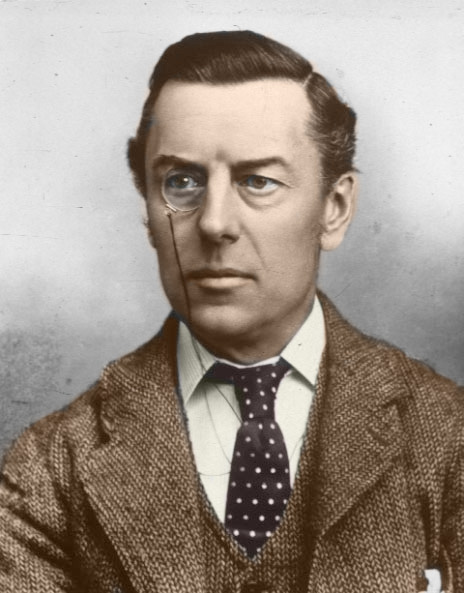
Joseph Chamberlain

Law's chance to make his mark came with the issue of tariff reform. To cover the costs of the Second Boer War, Lord Salisbury's Chancellor of the Exchequer (Michael Hicks Beach) suggested introducing import taxes or tariffs on foreign metal, flour and grain coming into Britain. Such tariffs had previously existed in Britain, but the last of these had been abolished in the 1870s because of the free trade movement. A duty was now introduced on imported corn. The issue became "explosive", dividing the British political world, and continued even after Salisbury retired and was replaced as prime minister by his nephew, Arthur Balfour.

Law took advantage of this, making his first major speech on 22 April 1902, in which he argued that while he felt a general tariff was unnecessary, an imperial customs union (which would put tariffs on items from outside the British Empire, instead of on every nation but Britain) was a good idea, particularly since other nations such as (Germany) and the United States had increasingly high tariffs. Using his business experience, he made a "plausible case" that there was no proof that tariffs led to increases in the cost of living, as the Liberals had argued. Again his memory came into good use – when William Harcourt accused Law of misquoting him, Law was able to precisely give the place in Hansard where Harcourt's speech was to be found.

As a result of Law's proven experience in business matters and his skill as an economic spokesman for the government, Balfour offered him the position of Parliamentary Secretary to the Board of Trade when he formed his government, which Law accepted, and he was formally appointed on 11 August 1902.

As Parliamentary Secretary his job was to assist the President of the Board of Trade, Gerald Balfour. At the time the tariff reform controversy was brewing, led by the Colonial Secretary Joseph Chamberlain, an ardent tariff reformer who "declared war" on free trade, and who persuaded the Cabinet that the Empire should be exempted from the new corn duty. After returning from a speaking tour of South Africa in 1903, Chamberlain found that the new Chancellor of the Exchequer (C. T. Ritchie) had instead abolished Hicks Beach's corn duty altogether in his budget. Angered by this, Chamberlain spoke at the Birmingham Town Hall on 15 May without the government's permission, arguing for an Empire-wide system of tariffs which would protect Imperial economies, forge the British Empire into one political entity and allow them to compete with other world powers.

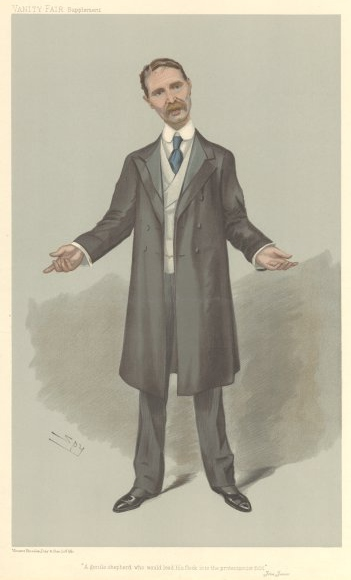
Bonar Law caricatured by Spy for Vanity Fair, 1905

The speech and its ideas split the Conservative Party and its coalition ally the Liberal Unionist Party into two wings – the Free Fooders, who supported free trade, and the Tariff Reformers, who supported Chamberlain's tariff reforms. Law was a dedicated Tariff Reformer, but whereas Chamberlain dreamed of a new golden age for Britain, Law focused on more mundane and practical goals, such as a reduction in unemployment. L. S. Amery said that to Law, the tariff reform programme was "a question of trade figures and not national and Imperial policy of expansion and consolidation of which trade was merely the economic factor". Keith Laybourn attributes Law's interest in tariff reform not only to the sound business practice that it represented but also that because of his place of birth "he was attracted by the Imperial tariff preference arrangements advocated by Joseph Chamberlain". Law's constituents in Blackfriars were not overly enthusiastic about tariff reform – Glasgow was a poor area at the time that had benefited from free trade.

In parliament, Law worked exceedingly hard at pushing for tariff reform, regularly speaking in the House of Commons and defeating legendary debaters such as Winston Churchill, Charles Dilke and H. H. Asquith, former home secretary and later prime minister. His speeches at the time were known for their clarity and common sense; Sir Ian Malcolm said that he made "the involved seem intelligible", and L. S. Amery said his arguments were "like the hammering of a skilled riveter, every blow hitting the nail on the head". Despite Law's efforts to forge consensus within the Conservatives, Balfour was unable to hold the two sides of his party together, and resigned as prime minister in December 1905, allowing the Liberals to form a government.

=== In opposition ===
The new prime minister, the Liberal Henry Campbell-Bannerman, immediately dissolved Parliament. Despite strong campaigning and a visit by Arthur Balfour, Law lost his seat in the ensuing general election. In total the Conservative Party and Liberal Unionists lost 246 seats, leaving them with only 156 members of parliament, the majority of them tariff reformers. Despite his loss, Law was at this stage such an asset to the Conservatives that an immediate effort was made to get him back into Parliament. The retirement of Frederick Rutherfoord Harris, MP for the safe Conservative seat of Dulwich, offered him a chance. Law was returned to Parliament in the ensuing by-election, increasing the Conservative majority to 1,279.

The party was struck a blow in July 1906, when two days after a celebration of his seventieth birthday, Joseph Chamberlain suffered a stroke and was forced to retire from public life. He was succeeded as leader of the tariff reformers by his son Austen Chamberlain, who despite previous experience as Chancellor of the Exchequer and enthusiasm for tariff reform was not as skilled a speaker as Law. As a result, Law joined Balfour's Shadow Cabinet as the principal spokesman for tariff reform. The death of Law's wife on 31 October 1909 led him to work even harder, treating his political career not only as a job but as a coping strategy for his loneliness.

==== The People's Budget and the House of Lords ====
Campbell-Bannerman resigned as prime minister in April 1908 and was replaced by H. H. Asquith. In 1909, he and his Chancellor of the Exchequer David Lloyd George introduced the People's Budget, which sought through increased direct and indirect taxes to redistribute wealth and fund social reform programmes. By parliamentary convention, financial and budget bills are not challenged by the House of Lords. But in this case, the predominantly Conservative and Liberal Unionist Lords rejected the bill on 30 April, setting off a constitutional crisis.

The Liberals called a general election for January 1910, and Law spent most of the preceding months campaigning up and down the country for other Unionist candidates and MPs, sure that his Dulwich seat was safe. He obtained an increased majority of 2,418. The overall result was more confused: the Conservatives gained 116 seats, bringing their total to 273, but this was still less than the Liberal caucus, and produced a hung parliament, as neither had a majority of the seats (the Irish Parliamentary Party, the Labour Party and the All-for-Ireland League took more than 120 seats in total). The Liberals remained in office with the support of the Irish Parliamentary Party. The Budget passed through the House of Commons a second time, and – as it now had an electoral mandate – was then approved by the House of Lords without a division.

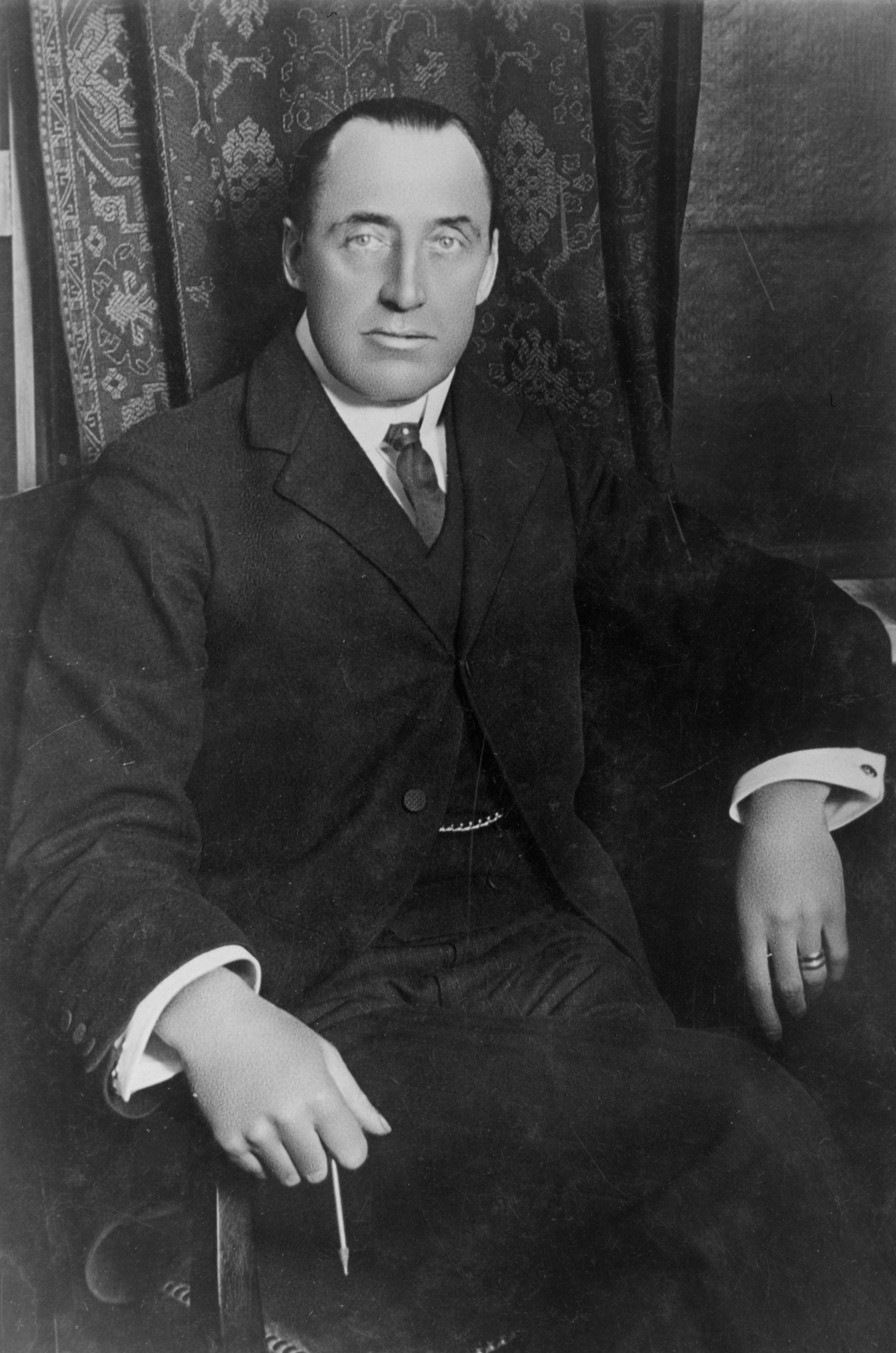
Edward Carson, who along with Law was one of the few non-representatives to be aware of the "Truce of God"

However, the crisis over the Budget had highlighted a long-standing constitutional question: should the House of Lords be able to overturn bills passed by the House of Commons? The Liberal government introduced a bill in February 1910 which would prevent the House of Lords vetoing finance bills, and would force them to pass any bill which had been passed by the Commons in three sessions of Parliament.

This was immediately opposed by the Unionists, and both parties spent the next several months in a running battle over the bill. The Conservatives were led by Arthur Balfour and Lord Lansdowne, who headed the Conservatives in the House of Lords, while Law spent the time concentrating on the continuing problem of tariff reform. The lack of progress had convinced some senior Unionists that it would be a good idea to scrap tariff reform altogether. Law disagreed, successfully arguing that tariff reform "was the first constructive work of the [Conservative Party]" and that to scrap it would "split the Party from top to bottom".

With this success, Law returned to the constitutional crisis surrounding the House of Lords. The death of King Edward VII on 6 May 1910 prompted the leaders of the major political parties to meet secretly in a "Truce of God" to discuss the Lords. The meetings were kept almost entirely secret: apart from the party representatives, the only people aware were F. E. Smith, J. L. Garvin, Edward Carson and Law. The group met about twenty times at Buckingham Palace between June and November 1910, with the Unionists represented by Arthur Balfour, Lord Cawdor, Lord Lansdowne and Austen Chamberlain. The proposal presented at the conference by David Lloyd George was a coalition government with members of both major parties in the Cabinet and a programme involving Home Rule, Poor Law reforms, imperial reorganisation and possibly tariff reforms. The Home Rule proposal would have made the United Kingdom a federation, with "Home Rule All Round" for Scotland, Ireland, and England and Wales. In the end the plans fell through: Balfour told Lloyd George on 2 November that the proposal would not work, and the conference was dissolved a few days later.

==== December 1910 general election ====
With the failure to establish a political consensus after the January 1910 general election, the Liberals called a second general election in December. The Conservative leadership decided that a good test of the popularity of the tariff reform programme would be to have a prominent tariff reformer stand for election in a disputed seat. They considered Law a prime candidate, and after debating it for a month he guardedly agreed, enthusiastic about the idea but worried about the effect of a defeat on the Party. Law was selected as the candidate for Manchester North West, and became drawn into party debates about how strong a tariff reform policy should be put in their manifesto. Law personally felt that duties on foodstuffs should be excluded, something agreed to by Alexander Acland-Hood, Edward Carson and others at a meeting of the Constitutional Club on 8 November 1910, but they failed to reach a consensus and the idea of including or excluding food duties continued to be something that divided the party.

During the constitutional talks the Conservatives had demanded that, if the Lords' veto were removed, Irish Home Rule should only be permitted if approved by a UK-wide referendum. In response Lord Crewe, Liberal Leader in the Lords, had suggested sarcastically that tariff reform – a policy of questionable popularity because of the likelihood of increased prices on imported food – should also be submitted to a referendum. Arthur Balfour now announced to a crowd of 10,000 at the Royal Albert Hall that after the coming election, a Conservative Government would indeed submit tariff reform to a referendum, something he described as "Bonar Law's proposal" or the "Referendum Pledge". The suggestion was no more Law's than it was any of the dozens of Conservatives who had suggested this to Balfour, and his comment was simply an attempt to "pass the buck" and avoid the anger of Austen Chamberlain, who was furious that such an announcement had been made without consulting him or the party. While Law had written a letter to Balfour suggesting that a referendum would attract wealthy Conservatives, he said that "declaration would do no good with [the working class] and might damp enthusiasm of best workers".

Parliament was dissolved on 28 November, with the election to take place and polling to end by 19 December. The Conservative and Liberal parties were equal in strength, and with the continued support of the Irish Nationalists the Liberal Party remained in government. Law called his campaign in Manchester North West the hardest of his career; his opponent, George Kemp, was a war hero who had fought in the Second Boer War and a former Conservative who had joined the Liberal party because of his disagreement with tariff reform.

In the end, Law narrowly lost, with 5,114 votes to Kemp's 5,559, but the election turned him into a "genuine [Conservative] hero", and he later said that the defeat did "more for him in the party than a hundred victories". In 1911, with the Conservative Party unable to afford him being out of Parliament, Law was elected in a March 1911 by-election for the safe Conservative seat of Bootle. The Liberal attempt to curb the veto power of the House of Lords was now backed by a threat, if necessary, to create hundreds of Liberal peers. Law favoured surrender on pragmatic grounds, as a Unionist-dominated House of Lords would retain some ability to delay Liberal attempts to introduce Irish Home Rule, Welsh Disestablishment or electoral reforms gerrymandered to help the Liberal Party. In August 1911 enough Unionist peers abstained or voted in favour of the Liberal bill for it to pass as the Parliament Act 1911, ending that particular dispute.

== Leader of the Conservative Party ==
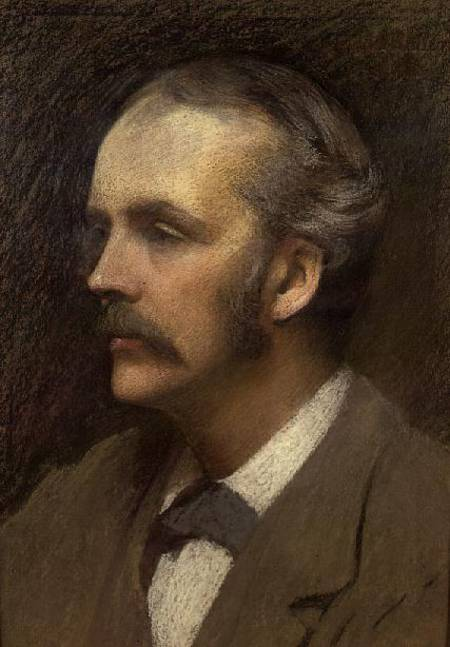
Arthur Balfour, who preceded Law as Leader of the Conservative Party

On the coronation of George V on 22 June 1911, Law was appointed as a Privy Councillor on the recommendation of the Prime Minister H. H. Asquith and Arthur Balfour. This was evidence of his seniority and importance within the Conservative Party. Balfour had become increasingly unpopular as Leader of the Conservative Party since the 1906 general election; tariff reformers saw his leadership as the reason for their electoral losses, and the "free fooders" had been alienated by Balfour's attempts to tame the zeal of the tariff reform faction. Balfour refused all suggestions of party reorganisation, until a meeting of senior Conservatives led by Lord Salisbury after the December 1910 electoral defeat issued an ultimatum demanding a review of party structure.

The defeat on the House of Lords issue turned a wing of the Conservative Party led by Henry Page Croft and his Reveille Movement, against Balfour. Leo Maxse began a Balfour Must Go campaign in his newspaper, the National Review, and by July 1911 Balfour was contemplating resignation. Law himself had no problem with Balfour's leadership, and along with Edward Carson attempted to regain support for him. By November 1911 it was accepted that Balfour was likely to resign, with the main competitors for the leadership being Law, Carson, Walter Long and Austen Chamberlain. When the elections began, Long and Chamberlain were the frontrunners; Chamberlain commanded the support of many tariff reformers, and Long that of the Irish Unionists. Carson immediately announced that he would not stand, and Law eventually announced that he would run for Leader, the day before Balfour resigned on 7 November.

At the beginning of the election Law held the support of no more than 40 of the 270 members of parliament; the remaining 230 were divided between Long and Chamberlain. Although Long believed he had the most MPs, his support was largely amongst backbenchers, and most of the whips and frontbenchers preferred Chamberlain.

With Long and Chamberlain almost neck-and-neck they called a meeting on 9 November to discuss the possibility of a deadlock. Chamberlain suggested that he would withdraw if this became a strong possibility, assuming Long did the same. Long, now concerned that his weak health would not allow him to survive the stress of party leadership, agreed. Both withdrew on 10 November, and on 13 November 232 MPs assembled at the Carlton Club, and Law was nominated as leader by Long and Chamberlain. With the unanimous support of the MPs, Law became Leader of the Conservative Party despite never having sat in Cabinet. Law's biographer, Robert Blake, wrote that he was an unusual choice to lead the Conservatives as a Presbyterian Canadian-Scots businessman had just become the leader of "the Party of Old England, the Party of the Anglican Church and the country squire, the party of broad acres and hereditary titles".

As leader, Law first "rejuvenated the party machine", selecting newer, younger and more popular whips and secretaries, elevating F. E. Smith and Lord Robert Cecil to the Shadow Cabinet and using his business acumen to reorganise the party, resulting in better relations with the press and local branches, along with the raising of a £671,000 "war chest" for the next general election: almost double that available at the previous one.

On 12 February 1912, he finally unified the two Unionist parties (Conservatives and Liberal Unionists) into the awkwardly named National Unionist Association of Conservative and Liberal-Unionist Organisations. From then on all were referred to as "Unionists" until the ratification of the Anglo-Irish Treaty in 1922, after which they became Conservatives again (though the name "Unionist" continued in use in Scotland and Northern Ireland).

In Parliament, Law introduced the so-called "new style" of speaking, with harsh, accusatory rhetoric, which dominates British politics to this day. This was as a counter to Arthur Balfour, known for his "masterly witticisms", because the party felt they needed a warrior-like figure. Law did not particularly enjoy his tougher manner, and at the State Opening of Parliament in February 1912 apologised directly to Asquith for his coming speech, saying, "I am afraid I shall have to show myself very vicious, Mr Asquith, this session. I hope you will understand." Law's "warrior king" figure helped unify the divided Conservatives into a single body, with him as the leader.

=== Social policy ===
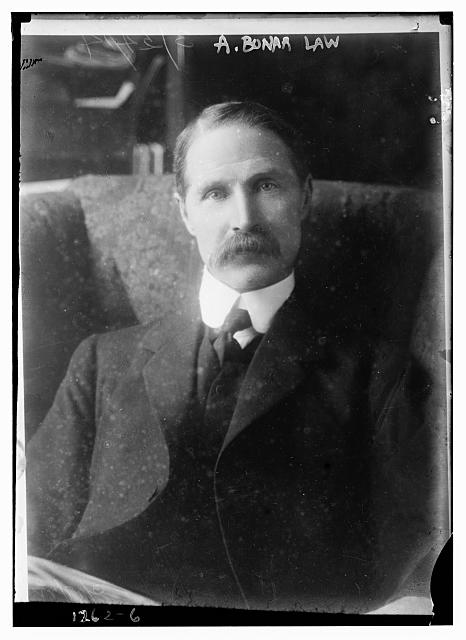
Andrew Bonar Law

During his early time as Conservative leader, the party's social policy was the most complicated and difficult to agree. In his opening speech as leader he said that the party would be one of principle, and would not be reactionary, instead sticking to their guns and holding firm policies. Despite this he left women's suffrage alone, leaving the party unwhipped and saying that "the less part we take in this question the better". In terms of social reform (legislation to improve the conditions of the poor and working classes) Law was similarly unenthusiastic, believing that the area was a Liberal one, in which they could not successfully compete. His response to a request by Lord Balcarres for a social programme was simply "As the [Liberal Party] refuse to formulate their policy in advance we should be equally absolved". His refusal to get drawn in may have actually strengthened his hold over Conservative MPs, many of whom were similarly uninterested in social reform.

In his first public speech as leader at the Royal Albert Hall on 26 January 1912 he listed his three biggest concerns: an attack on the Liberal government for failing to submit Home Rule to a referendum; tariff reform; and the Conservative refusal to let the Ulster Unionists be "trampled upon" by an unfair Home Rule bill. Both tariff reform and Ulster dominated his political work, with Austen Chamberlain saying that Law "once said to me that he cared intensely for only two things: Tariff Reform and Ulster; all the rest was only part of the game".

=== More tariff reform ===
After further review with members of his party, Law changed his initial beliefs on tariff reform and accepted the full package, including duties on foodstuffs. On 29 February 1912 the entire Conservative parliamentary body (i.e. both MPs and peers) met at Lansdowne House, with Lord Lansdowne chairing. Lansdowne argued that although the electorate might prefer the Conservative Party if they dropped food duties from their tariff reform plan, it would open them to accusations of bad faith and "poltroonery". Law endorsed Lansdowne's argument, pointing out that any attempt to avoid food duties would cause an internal party struggle and could only aid the Liberals, and that Canada, the most economically important colony and a major exporter of foodstuffs, would never agree to tariffs without British support of food duties.

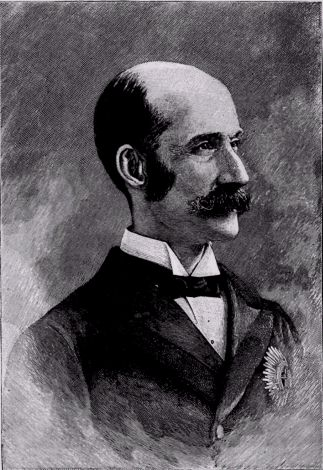
Lord Lansdowne, Law's primary speaker for the repeal of the Referendum Pledge

Lord Salisbury, who opposed food duties, wrote to Law several weeks later suggesting they separate foodstuffs from tariff reform for the referendum. If the electorate liked food duties, they would vote for the entire package; if not, they did not have to. Law replied arguing that it would be impossible to do so effectively, and that with the increasing costs of defence and social programmes it would be impossible to raise the necessary capital except by comprehensive tariff reform. He argued that a failure to offer the entire tariff reform package would split the Conservative Party down the middle, offending the tariff reform faction, and that if such a split took place "I could not possibly continue as leader".

Law postponed withdrawing the tariff reform "Referendum Pledge" because of the visit of Robert Borden, the newly elected Conservative prime minister of Canada, to London planned for July 1912. Meeting with Borden on his arrival, Law got him to agree to make a statement about the necessity of Imperial tariff reform, promising reciprocal agreements and saying that failure by London to agree tariff reform would result in an "irresistible pressure" for Canada to make a treaty with another nation, most obviously the United States.

Law decided that the November party conference was the perfect time to announce the withdrawal of the Referendum Pledge, and that Lord Lansdowne should do it, because he had been leader in the House of Lords when the pledge was made and because of his relatively low profile during the original tariff reform dispute. When the conference opened the British political world was febrile; on 12 November the opposition had narrowly defeated the government on an amendment to the Home Rule Bill, and the next evening, amidst hysterical shouting from the opposition, Asquith attempted to introduce a motion reversing the previous vote. As the MPs filed out at the end of the day, Winston Churchill began taunting the opposition, and in his anger Ronald McNeil hurled a copy of Standing Orders of the House at Churchill, hitting him on the head. Law refused to condemn the events, and it seems apparent that while he had played no part in organising them, they had been planned by the party whips. As party leader, he was most likely aware of the plans even if he did not actively participate.

The conference was opened on 14 November 1912 by Lord Farquhar, who immediately introduced Lord Lansdowne. Lansdowne revoked the Referendum Pledge, saying that as the government had failed to submit Home Rule to a referendum, the offer that tariff reform would also be submitted was null and void. Lansdowne promised that when the Unionists took office they would "do so with a free hand to deal with tariffs as they saw fit". Law then rose to speak, and in line with his agreement to let Lansdowne speak for tariff reform mentioned it only briefly when he said "I concur in every word which has fallen from Lord Lansdowne". He instead promised a reversal of several Liberal policies when the Unionists came to power, including the disestablishment of the Welsh Church, land taxes, and Irish Home Rule. The crowd "cheered themselves hoarse" at Law's speech.

However, the reaction from the party outside the conference hall was not a positive one. Law had not consulted the local constituency branches about his plan, and several important constituency leaders led by Archibald Salvidge and Lord Derby planned for a meeting of the Lancashire party, the centre of discontent, on 21 December. Law was preoccupied with the problem of Irish Home Rule and was unable to give the discontent his full attention. He continued to believe that his approach to the problem of tariff reform was the correct one, and wrote to John Strachey on 16 November saying that "it was a case of a choice of two evils, and all that one could do was to take the lesser of the two, and that I am sure we have done". Speaking to Edward Carson, F.E. Smith, Austen Chamberlain and Lord Balcarres in December after two weeks of receiving negative letters from party members about the change, Law outlined that he would not be averse to a return to the previous policy considering the negative feelings from the party, but felt that this would require the resignation of both himself and Lansdowne.

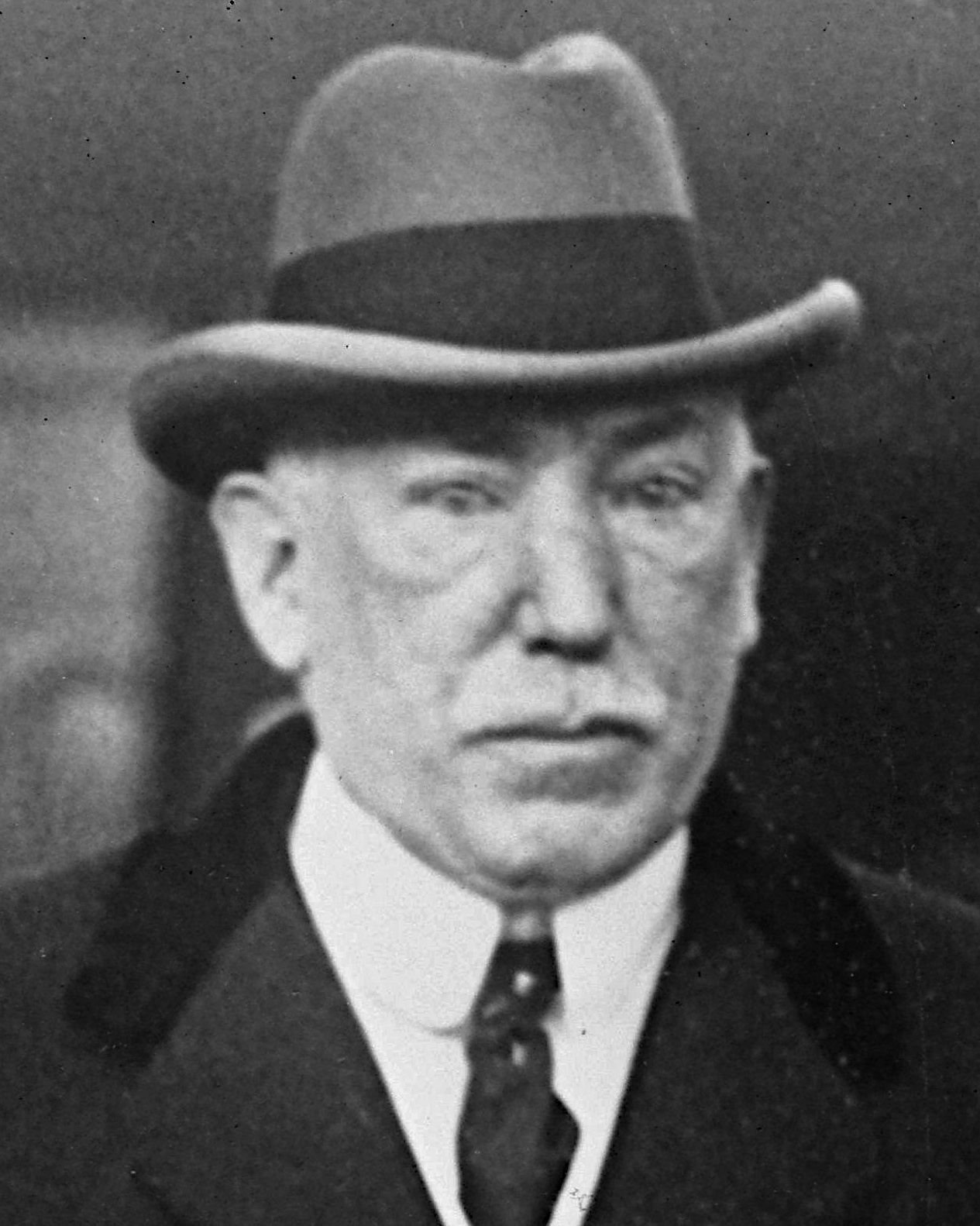
James Craig, who helped draft the January Memorandum

Law again wrote to Strachey saying that he continued to feel this policy was the correct one, and only regretted that the issue was splitting the party at a time when unity was needed to fight the Home Rule problem. At the meeting of the Lancashire party the group under Derby condemned Law's actions and called for a three-week party recess before deciding what to do about the repeal of the Referendum Pledge. This was an obvious ultimatum to Law, giving him a three-week period to change his mind. Law believed that Derby was "unprincipled and treacherous", particularly since he then circulated a questionnaire among Lancashire party members with leading questions such as "do you think the abandonment of the referendum will do harm?" Law met the Lancashire party on 2 January 1913 and ordered that they must replace any food tariff based resolutions with a vote of confidence in him as a leader, and that any alternative would result in his resignation.

After a chance meeting at which Edward Carson learnt of Law and Lansdowne's acceptance of possible resignation, he was spurred to ask Edward Goulding to beg Law and Lansdowne to compromise over the policy and remain as leaders. The compromise, known as the January Memorial, was agreed by Carson, James Craig, Law and Lansdowne at Law's house between 6–8 January 1913, affirming the support of the signatories for Law and his policies, and noting that his resignation was not wanted.

Within two days 231 of the 280 Conservative MPs had signed it; 27 frontbenchers had not been invited, neither had five who were not in London, seven who were ill, the Speaker and a few others who could not be found – only eight MPs actively refused to sign. Law's official response took the form of an open letter published on 13 January 1913, in which Law offered a compromise that food duties would not be placed before Parliament to vote on until after a second, approving election took place.

=== Irish Home Rule ===
The January and December elections in 1910 destroyed the large Liberal majority, meaning they relied on the Irish Nationalists to maintain a government. As a result, they were forced to consider Home Rule, and with the passing of the Parliament Act 1911 which replaced the Lords' veto with a two-year power of delay on most issues, the Conservative Party became aware that unless they could dissolve Parliament or sabotage the Home Rule Bill, introduced in 1912, it would most likely become law by 1914.

As the child of an Ulster family who had spent much time in the area (his father had moved back there several years after Law moved to Scotland), Law believed the gap between Ulster Unionism and Irish Nationalism could never be crossed. Despite this he said little about Home Rule until the passing of the Parliament Act in 1911, calling it the "Home Rule in Disguise Act" and saying it was an attempt to change parliamentary procedures so as to allow Home Rule "through the back door".

After the act's passage, he made a speech in the Commons saying if the Liberals wished to pass a Home Rule Bill they should submit it to the electorate by calling a general election. His elevation to the leadership of the Conservative Party allowed him a platform to voice his opinion to the public, and his speeches (culminating with the January 1912 speech at the Royal Albert Hall) were centred on Home Rule as much as they were around tariff reform. In contrast to Balfour's "milk and water" opposition to Home Rule, Law presented a "fire and blood" opposition to Home Rule that at times seemed to suggest that he was willing to contemplate a civil war to stop Home Rule. Law stated he would not stop "from any action ... we think necessary to defeat one of the most ignoble conspiracies ... ever formed against the liberties of free-born men." As the Conservative Party was badly divided by the tariff issue, Law had decided to make opposition for Home Rule his signature issue as the best way of unifying the Conservative Party. Right from the start, Law presented his anti-Home Rule stance more in terms of protecting Protestant majority Ulster from being ruled by a Parliament in Dublin that would be dominated by Catholics than in terms of preserving the Union, much to the chagrin of many Unionists.

Law was supported by Sir Edward Carson, leader of the Ulster Unionists. Although Law sympathised with the Ulster Unionists politically he did not agree with the religious intolerance shown to Catholics. The passions unleashed by the Home Rule debate frequently threatened to get out of hand. In January 1912, when Winston Churchill planned to deliver a speech in favour of Home Rule in at the Ulster Hall in Belfast, the Ulster Unionist Council (UUC) threatened to use violence if necessary to stop Churchill from speaking. The legal scholar A. V. Dicey, himself an opponent of Home Rule, wrote in a letter to Law that the threats of violence were "the worst mistake" that undermined "the whole moral strength" of the Unionist movement. But as Carson admitted in a letter to Law, the situation in Belfast was beyond his control as many UUC members were also members of the Orange Order, and the prospect of Churchill's visit to Belfast had angered so many of his followers that he felt he had to threaten violence as the best possible way of stopping the planned speech instead of leaving it to his followers who might otherwise riot. As it was, Churchill agreed to cancel his speech in response to warnings that the police would not be able to guarantee his security. Besides for his concerns about the violence, Dicey was also worried about the way in which Law was more interested about stopping Home Rule from being imposed on Ulster, instead of all of Ireland, which seemed to imply he was willing to accept the partition of Ireland. Many Irish Unionists outside of Ulster felt abandoned by Law, who seemed to care only about Ulster.

==== Third Home Rule Bill ====
The 1912 session of Parliament opened on 14 February with a stated intent by the Liberal Party in the King's Speech to introduce a new Home Rule Bill. The bill was to be introduced on 11 April, and four days before that Law travelled to Ulster for a tour of the area. The pinnacle of this was a meeting on 9 April in the grounds of the Royal Agricultural Society near Balmoral (an area of Belfast), attended by seventy Unionist MPs and the Primate of All Ireland, and topped by "perhaps the largest Union Jack ever made" – 48 feet by 25 feet on a flagpole 90 feet high.

At the meeting both Law and Carson swore to the crowd that "never under any circumstances will we submit to Home Rule". However, the Parliament Act and the government majority made such a victory against the Bill unlikely unless the government could be brought down or Parliament dissolved. A second problem was that not all Unionists opposed Home Rule to the same degree; some hardcore Unionists would oppose any attempt at Home Rule, others thought it inevitable that the Bill would pass and were simply trying to get the best deal possible for Ulster. The spectre of civil war was also raised – the Ulstermen began to form paramilitary groups such as the Ulster Volunteers, and there was a strong possibility that if it came to fighting the British Army would have to be sent in to support the underfunded and understaffed Royal Irish Constabulary.

The argument of Law and the Unionists between 1912 and 1914 was based on three complaints. Firstly, Ulster would never accept forced Home Rule, and made up a quarter of Ireland; if the Liberals wanted to force this issue, military force would be the only way. Law thundered that "Do you plan to hurl the full majesty and power of the law, supported on the bayonets of the British Army, against a million Ulstermen marching under the Union Flag and singing 'God Save The King'? Would the Army hold? Would the British people – would the Crown – stand for such a slaughter?" A second complaint was that the government had so far refused to submit it to a general election, as Law had been suggesting since 1910. Law warned that "you will not carry this Bill without submitting it to the people of this country, and, if you make the attempt, you will succeed only in breaking our Parliamentary machine". The third complaint was that the Liberals had still not honoured the preamble of the Parliament Act 1911, which promised "to substitute for the House of Lords as it at present exists a Second Chamber constituted on a popular instead of a hereditary basis". The Unionist argument was that the Liberals were trying to make a massive constitutional change while the constitution was suspended. In May 1912, Law was told by the Conservative whip Lord Balcarres that outside of Ireland "the electors are apathetic" about Home Rule, suggesting that he should de-emphasis the topic.

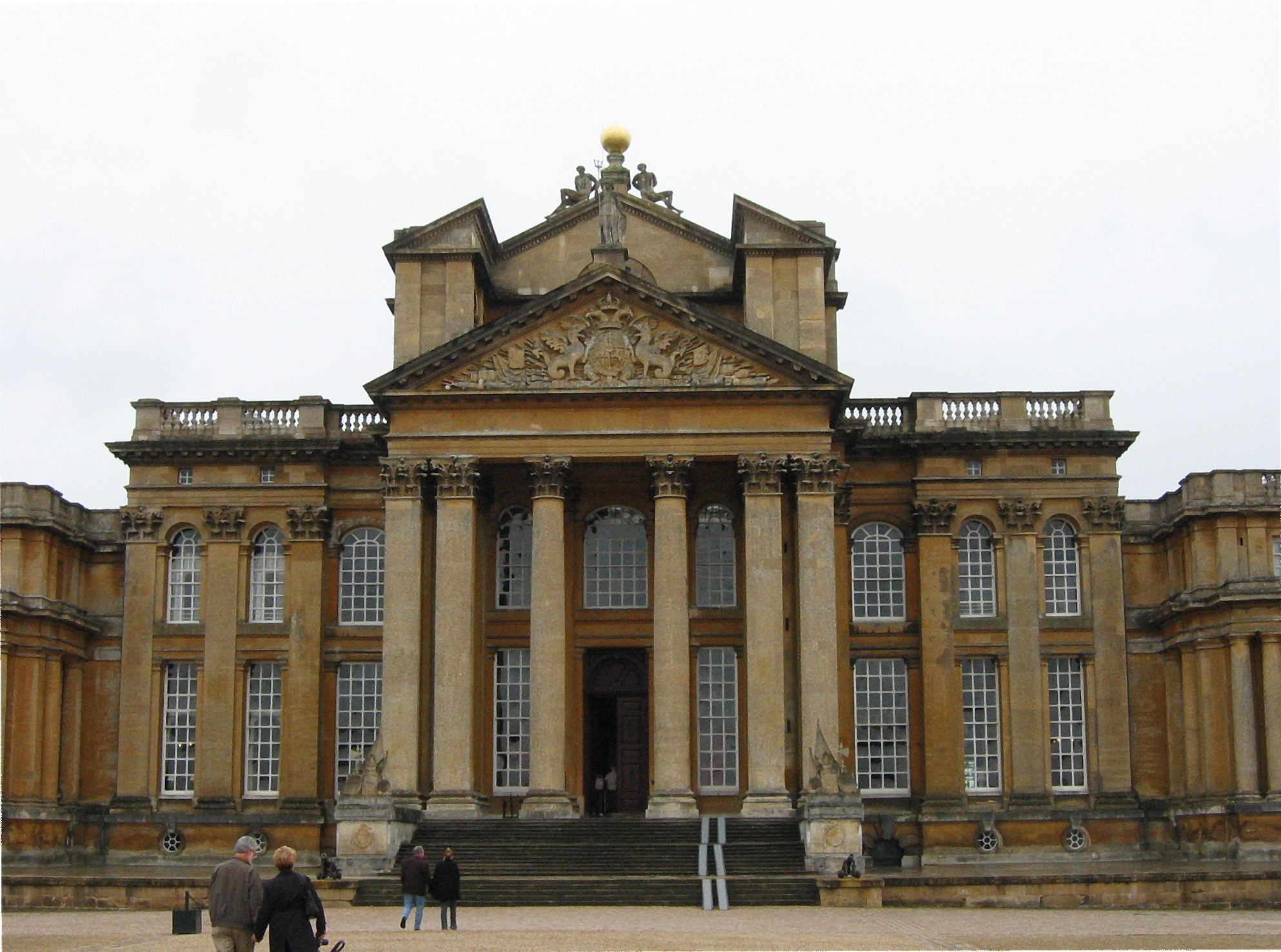
Blenheim Palace, where the anti-Home Rule factions held their meeting on 27 July 1912

In July 1912, Asquith travelled to Dublin (the first sitting prime minister to do so in over a century) to make a speech, ridiculing Unionist demands for a referendum on the issue via an election and calling their campaign "purely destructive in its objects, anarchic and chaotic in its methods". In response the Unionists had a meeting on 27 July at Blenheim Palace, the birthplace of Winston Churchill, one of Asquith's ministers. More than 13,000 people attended, including over 40 peers. In Law's speech he said "I said so to [the Liberals] and I say so now, with the full sense of the responsibility which attaches to my position, that if the attempt be made under present conditions, I can imagine no length of resistance to which Ulster will go, in which I shall not be ready to support them, and in which they will not be supported by the overwhelming majority of the British people". Law added that if Asquith continued with the Home Rule bill, the government would be "lighting the fires of civil war". This speech was more known and criticised than any others; it implied both he and the British people would support the Ulstermen in anything, including armed rebellion.

Despite the conflict and fierce resistance, the Bill continued its passage through Parliament. It moved to its second reading on 9 June, and the Committee stage on 11 June, where it became fraught in controversy after a young Liberal named Thomas Agar-Robartes proposed an amendment excluding four of the Ulster counties (Londonderry, Down, Antrim, and Armagh) from the Irish Parliament. This put Law in a delicate situation, since he had previously said that he would support a system allowing each county to remain "outside the Irish Parliament", at the same time saying that he would not support any amendment that did not have Ulster's full co-operation. If he accepted the amendment, he would be seen as abandoning the Irish Unionists, but on the other hand if the amendment was carried it might disrupt the government by causing a split between the Liberals and Irish Nationalists, bringing down the government and thus forcing an election.

If Unionists wished to win the ensuing election they would have to show they were willing to compromise. In the end the amendment failed, but with the Liberal majority reduced by 40, and when a compromise amendment was proposed by another Liberal MP the government Whips were forced to trawl for votes. Law saw this as a victory, as it highlighted the split in the government. Edward Carson tabled another amendment on 1 January 1913 which would exclude all nine Ulster counties, more to test government resolve than anything else. While it failed, it allowed the Unionists to portray themselves as the party of compromise and the Liberals as stubborn and recalcitrant.

The Unionists in Ulster were committed to independence from any Irish Home Rule. They secretly authorised a Commission of Five to write a constitution for "a provisional Government of Ulster ... to come into operation on the day of the passage of any Home Rule Bill, to remain in force until Ulster shall again resume unimpaired citizenship in the United Kingdom".

On 28 September 1912, Carson led 237,638 of his followers in signing a Solemn League and Covenant saying that Ulster would refuse to recognise the authority of any Parliament of Ireland arising from Home Rule. The "Ulster Covenant", as the Solemn League and Covenant was popularly called, recalled the National Covenant signed by the Scots in 1638 to resist King Charles I who was viewed by Scots Presbyterians as a crypto-Catholic, and was widely seen as a sectarian document that promoted a "Protestant crusade". The Conservative MP Alfred Cripps wrote in a letter to Law that English Catholics like himself were opposed to Home Rule, but he was troubled by the way that Law seemed to be using the issue as "an occasion to attack their religion". In his reply of 7 October 1912, Law wrote he was opposed to religious bigotry and claimed that, as far he could tell, no "responsible" Unionist leader in Ireland had attacked the Roman Catholic Church. In fact, the Conservative MP Lord Hugh Cecil had in the summer of 1912 given anti-Home Rule speeches in Ireland where he shouted "To Hell with the Pope!", and was not censured by Law. When Parliament resumed in October after the summer recess, the Home Rule Bill was passed by the Commons. As expected, the House of Lords rejected it 326 to 69, and under the provisions of the Parliament Act it could only be passed if it was passed twice more by the Commons in successive Parliaments. In December 1912, the chairmen of the Conservative Party, Arthur Steel-Maitland, wrote to Law that the Home Rule issue did not command much attention in England, and asked that he move away from the topic which he asserted was damaging the image of the Conservatives.

==== Second passage ====
The end of 1912 saw the end of a year of political struggle for Law. As well as the problem of Home Rule, there were internal party struggles; supporters of the Church of England or military reform lambasted Law for not paying attention to their causes, and tariff reformers argued with him over his previous compromise on food duties. Despite this, most Conservatives realised that as a fighting leader, Law could not be bettered. The results of by-elections throughout 1913 continued to favour them, but progress on the Home Rule Bill was less encouraging; on 7 July it was again passed by the Commons, and again rejected by the Lords on 15 July. In response, the UUC created a paramilitary group, the Ulster Volunteer Force (UVF), to fight against the British government if necessary to stop Home Rule. The Conservative politician Lord Hythe, wrote to Law to suggest the Conservatives needed to present a constructive alternative to Home Rule and he had the "duty to tell these Ulstermen" that there was no need for the UVF. Another Tory peer, Lord Sailsbury, wrote to Law that as much as he was opposed to Home Rule that: "I cannot support political lawlessness and I shall either disenfranchise myself or vote Liberal ... rather than encourage armed resistance in Ulster." Lord Balcarres wrote to Law that much of the Conservative caucus were "deeply confused and uncertain" and the "policies of reckless defiance" were unpopular with the party membership in England. Balcarres wrote he was "much alarmed lest some sporadic outbreak by Orangemen should ... alienate English sympathies". Lord Lansdowne advised Law to be "extremely careful in our relations with Carson and his friends" and find a way of stopping F. E. Smith's "habit of expressing rather violent sentiments in the guise of messages from the Unionist party". Balfour wrote to Law that he had "much misgiving upon the general loosening of the ordinary ties of social obligation ... I do most strongly feel that nothing can be more demoralising to a society than that some of its ... most loyal members should deliberately organise themselves for the purpose of offering ... armed resistance to persons ... representing lawful authority."

During the debate on the Home Rule bill, Carson submitted an amendment that would exclude the 9 counties of Ulster from the jurisdiction of the proposed Parliament that would govern from Dublin, which was defeated by the Liberal MPs. However, Carson's amendment which would lead to the partition of Ireland caused much alarm with Irish Unionists outside of Ulster and led many to write letters from Law seeking assurances that he would not abandon them for the sake of saving Ulster from Home Rule. Carson told Law that he favoured a compromise under which Home Rule would be granted to southern Ireland, but not Ulster, and at the same time some sort of home rule be granted to Wales and Scotland as well. Law himself in a letter to a friend stated that the British public was "so sick of the whole Irish question" that the majority would probably agree to a compromise of a Home Rule for Ireland sans Ulster.

Parliament rose for the summer recess on 15 August, and Law and the Unionists spent the summer trying to convince the King to voice an opinion on the issue. Their first suggestion was that he should withhold the royal assent on it, something that horrified Law's constitutional law adviser A. V. Dicey. The second was more reasonable – they argued that the Liberals had put the King in an impossible position by asking him to ratify a bill that would infuriate half of the population. His only option was to write a memo to Asquith saying this and requesting that the problem of home rule be put to the electorate via a general election. After thinking on this, the King agreed, and handed a note to Asquith on 11 August requesting either an election or an all-party conference.

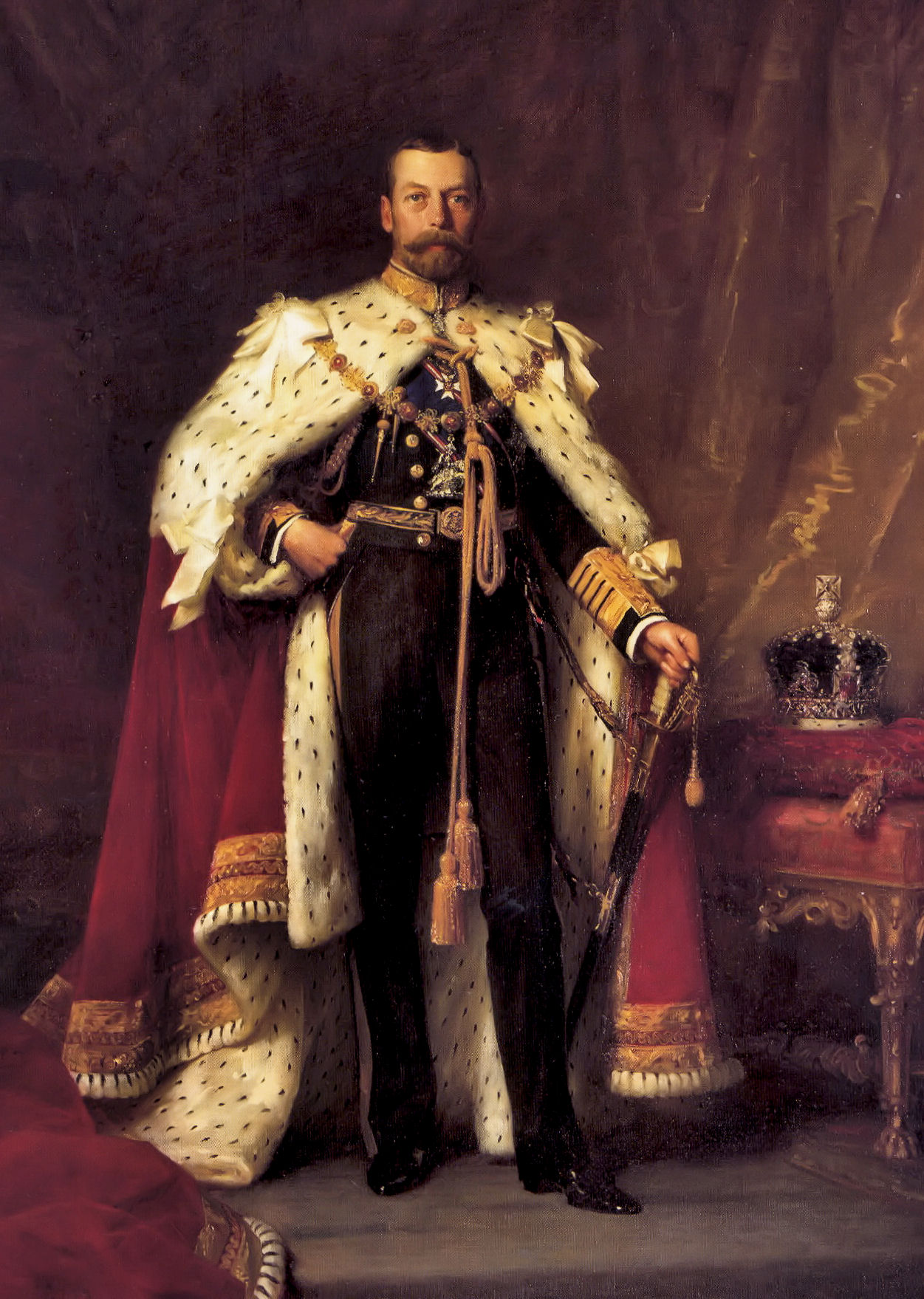
King George V, who, after pressure from the Unionists, requested that the Liberals put Home Rule to the test of a general election

Asquith responded with two notes, the first countering the Unionist claim that it would be acceptable for the King to dismiss Parliament or withhold assent of the Bill to force an election, and the second arguing that a Home Rule election would not prove anything, since a Unionist victory would only be due to other problems and scandals and would not assure supporters of the current government that Home Rule was truly opposed.

King George pressed for a compromise, summoning various political leaders to Balmoral Castle individually for talks. Law arrived on 13 September, and again pointed out to the King his belief that if the Government continued to refuse an election fought over Home Rule and instead forced it on Ulster, the Ulstermen would not accept it and any attempts to enforce it would not be obeyed by the British Army.

By early October, the King was pressuring the British political world for an all-party conference. Fending this off, Law instead met with senior party members to discuss developments. Law, Balfour, Smith and Long discussed the matter, all except Long favouring a compromise with the Liberals. Long represented the anti-Home Rule elements in Southern Ireland, and from this moment onwards Southern and Northern attitudes towards Home Rule began to diverge. Law then met with Edward Carson, and afterwards expressed the opinion that "the men of Ulster do desire a settlement on the basis of leaving Ulster out, and Carson thinks such an arrangement could be carried out without any serious attack from the Unionists in the South".

On 8 October, Asquith wrote to Law suggesting an informal meeting of the two party leaders, which Law accepted. The two met at Cherkley Court, the home of Law's ally Sir Max Aitken MP (later Lord Beaverbrook), on 14 October. The meeting lasted an hour, and Law told Asquith that he would continue to try to have Parliament dissolved, and that in any ensuing election the Unionists would accept the result even if it went against them. Law later expressed his fear to Lansdowne that Asquith would persuade the Irish Nationalists to accept Home Rule with the exclusion of four Ulster counties with Protestant/unionist majorities. Carson would not accept this, requiring six of nine ulster counties to be excluded (i.e., four with unionist majorities plus two majority nationalist, leaving the three Ulster counties with large nationalist majorities, leading to an overall unionist majority in the six); such a move might split the Unionists. Law knew that Asquith was unlikely to consent to a general election, since he would almost certainly lose it, and that any attempt to pass the Home Rule Bill "without reference to the electorate" would lead to civil disturbance. As such, Asquith was stuck "between a rock and a hard place" and was sure to negotiate.

Asquith and Law met for a second private meeting on 6 November, at which Asquith raised three possibilities. The first, suggested by Sir Edward Grey, consisted of "Home Rule within Home Rule" – Home Rule covering Ulster, but with partial autonomy for Ulster. The second was that Ulster would be excluded from Home Rule for a number of years before becoming part of it, and the third was that Ulster would be excluded from Home Rule for as long as it liked, with the opportunity of joining when it wished. Law made it clear to Asquith that the first two options were unacceptable, but the third might be accepted in some circles.

The leaders then discussed the geographical definition of the area to be excluded from Home Rule; Ulster formally consists of nine counties, of which only four had a clear unionist majority, three a clear nationalist majority and two a small nationalist majority – however, overall a practical problem was that the nine counties of Ulster were majority nationalist. Carson always referred to nine counties of Ulster, but Law told Asquith that if an appropriate settlement could be made with a smaller number, Carson "would see his people and probably, though I could not give any promise to that effect, try to induce them to accept it".

The third meeting was on 10 December and Law, raging because Asquith had not yet presented a concrete way to exclude Ulster, made little progress. Law brushed aside Asquith's suggestions and insisted that only the exclusion of Ulster was worth considering. He later wrote that "My feeling, however, is that Asquith has no hope whatsoever of making such an arrangement and that his present idea is simply to let things drift in the meantime ... I do not understand why he took the trouble of seeing me at all. The only explanation I can give is that I think he is in a funk about the whole position and thought that meeting me might keep the thing open at least".

With the failure of these talks, Law accepted that a compromise was unlikely, and from January 1914 he returned to the position that the Unionists were "opposed utterly to Home Rule". The campaign was sufficient to bring the noted organiser Lord Milner back into politics to support the Unionists, and he immediately asked L. S. Amery to write a British Covenant saying that the signers would, if the Home Rule Bill passed, "feel justified in taking or supporting any action that may be effective to prevent it being put into operation, and more particularly to prevent the armed forces of the Crown being used to deprive the people of Ulster of their rights as citizens of the United Kingdom". The Covenant was announced at a massive rally in Hyde Park on 4 April 1914, with hundreds of thousands assembling to hear Milner, Long and Carson speak. By the middle of the summer Long claimed more than 2,000,000 people had signed the Covenant.

Law's critics, including George Dangerfield, condemned his actions in assuring the Ulster Unionists of Conservative Party support in their armed resistance to Home Rule, as unconstitutional, verging on promoting a civil war. Law's supporters argued that he was acting constitutionally by forcing the Liberal government into calling the election it had been avoiding, to obtain a mandate for their reforms.

==== Army (Annual) Act ====
Law was not directly involved in the British Covenant campaign as he was focusing on a practical way to defeat the Home Rule Bill. His first attempt was via the Army (Annual) Act, something that "violated a basic and ancient principle of the constitution". Every year since the Glorious Revolution, the Act had fixed the maximum number of soldiers in the British Army; rejecting it would technically make the Army an illegal institution.

Lord Selborne had written to Law in 1912 to point out that vetoing or significantly amending the Act in the House of Lords would force the government to resign, and such a course of action was also suggested by others in 1913–14. Law believed that subjecting Ulstermen to a Dublin-based government they did not recognise was itself constitutionally damaging, and that amending the Army (Annual) Act to prevent the use of force in Ulster (he never suggested vetoing it) would not violate the constitution any more than the actions the government had already undertaken.

By 12 March he had established that, should the Home Rule Bill be passed under the Parliament Act 1911, the Army (Annual) Act should be amended in the Lords to stipulate that the Army could not "be used in Ulster to prevent or interfere with any step which may thereafter be taken in Ulster to organise resistance to the enforcement of the Home Rule Act in Ulster nor to suppress any such resistance until and unless the present Parliament has been dissolved and a period of three months shall have lapsed after the meeting of a new Parliament". The Shadow Cabinet consulted legal experts, who agreed wholeheartedly with Law's suggestion. Although several members expressed dissent, the Shadow Cabinet decided "provisionally to agree to amendment of army act. but to leave details and decisions as to the moment of acting to Lansdowne and Law". In the end no amendment to the Army Act was offered, though; many backbenchers and party loyalists became agitated by the scheme and wrote to him that it was unacceptable – Ian Malcolm, a fanatical Ulster supporter, told Law that amending the Army Act would drive him out of the Party.

== World War I ==
On 30 July 1914, on the eve of World War I, Law met with Asquith and agreed to temporarily suspend the issue of Home Rule to avoid domestic discontent during wartime. By the following day both leaders had convinced their parties to agree to this move. On 3 August, Law promised openly in Commons that his Conservative Party would give "unhesitating support" to the government's war policy. On 4 August, Germany rejected British demands for a withdrawal from Belgium, and Britain declared war.

Over the coming months, the Liberal, Labour and Conservative whips worked out a truce suspending confrontational politics until either 1 January 1915 or until the end of the War. On 4 August, both Asquith and Law made speeches together at the Middlesex Guildhall, and uncomfortably socialised with each other's parties. On 6 August, the Conservatives learnt that Asquith planned to put the Home Rule Bill on the statute books; Law wrote an angry letter to Asquith, the response of which was that Asquith could either pass the bill immediately, suspending it for the duration of the conflict, or make it law with a six-month delay and with a three-year exclusion for Ulster. Law responded with a speech in the Commons, saying that "the Government have treated us abominably ... but we are in the middle of a great struggle. Until that struggle [is] over, so far as we are concerned, in everything connected with it there would be no parties, there would openly be a nation. In regard to this debate I have made protest as well as I could, but when I have finished we shall take no further part in the discussion". The entire Party then left the Commons silently, and although a strong protest (Asquith later admitted that "it was unique in my or I think anybody's experience") the bill was still passed, although with a suspension for the duration of the War.

The Conservatives soon began to get annoyed that they were unable to criticise the Government, and took this into Parliament; rather than criticising policy, they would attack individual ministers, including the Lord Chancellor (who they considered "far too enamoured of German culture") and the Home Secretary, who was "too tender to aliens". By Christmas 1914 they were anxious about the war; it was not, in their opinion, going well, and yet they were restricted to serving on committees and making recruitment speeches. At about the same time, Law and David Lloyd George met to discuss the possibility of a coalition government. Law was supportive of the idea in some ways, seeing it as a probability that "a coalition government would come in time".

=== Coalition government ===
==== Background and information ====
The crisis which forced a coalition was twofold; first the Shell Crisis of 1915, and then the resignation of Lord Fisher, the First Sea Lord. The Shell Crisis was a shortage of artillery shells on the Western Front. It indicated a failure to fully organise British industry. Asquith tried to ward off the criticism the day before the debate, praising his government's efforts and saying that "I do not believe that any army has ever either entered upon a campaign or been maintained during a campaign with better or more adequate equipment". The Conservatives, whose sources of information included officers such as Sir John French, were not put off, and instead became furious.

Over the next few days, the Conservative backbenchers threatened to break the truce and mount an attack on the government over the munitions situation. Law forced them to back down on 12 May, but on the 14th an article appeared in The Times blaming the British failure at the Battle of Aubers Ridge on the lack of munitions. This again stirred up the backbenchers, who were only just kept in line. The Shadow Cabinet took a similar line; things could not go on as they were. The crisis was only halted with the resignation of Lord Fisher. Fisher had opposed Winston Churchill over the Gallipoli Campaign, and felt that he could not continue in government if the two would be in conflict. Law knew that this would push the Conservative back bench over the edge, and met with David Lloyd George on 17 May to discuss Fisher's resignation. Lloyd George decided that "the only way to preserve a united front was to arrange for more complete cooperation between parties in the direction of the War". Lloyd George reported the meeting to Asquith, who agreed that a coalition was inescapable. He and Law agreed to form a coalition government.

Law's next job, therefore, was to assist the Liberal Party in creating a new government. In their discussions on 17 May, both Law and Lloyd George had agreed that Lord Kitchener should not remain in the War Office, and removing him became top priority. The press began a campaign supporting Kitchener on 21 May, and the popular feeling that this raised convinced Law, Lloyd George and Asquith that Kitchener could not be removed. To keep him and at the same time remove the munitions supply from his grasp to prevent a repeat of the "shells crisis" the Ministry of Munitions was created, with Lloyd George becoming Minister of Munitions.

Law eventually accepted the post of Colonial Secretary, an unimportant post in wartime; Asquith had made it clear that he would not allow a Conservative minister to head the Exchequer, and that with Kitchener (whom he considered a Conservative) in the War Office, he would not allow another Conservative to hold a similarly important position. Fearing for the integrity of the coalition, Law accepted this position. Outside of Law's position, other Conservatives also gained positions in the new administration; Arthur Balfour became First Lord of the Admiralty, Austen Chamberlain became Secretary of State for India and Edward Carson became Attorney General.

==== Colonial Secretary ====
During Law's time as Colonial Secretary, the three main issues were the question of manpower for the British Army, the crisis in Ireland and the Gallipoli campaign. Gallipoli took priority, as seen by Asquith's restructuring of his War Council into a Dardanelles Committee. Members included Kitchener, Law, Churchill, Lloyd George and Lansdowne, with the make-up divided between political parties to defuse tension and provide criticism of policy. The main discussion was on the possibility of reinforcing the forces already landed, something Law disagreed with. With Asquith and the Army in support, however, he felt that he was ill-equipped to combat the proposal. Five more divisions were landed, but faced heavy casualties for little gain. As a result, Law led a strong resistance to the idea at the next Committee meeting on 18 August. The idea only avoided being scrapped thanks to the French promise to send forces in early September, and the arguing became an immense strain on the government.

Law entered the coalition government as Colonial Secretary in May 1915, his first Cabinet post, and, following the resignation of Prime Minister and Liberal Party Leader Asquith in December 1916, was invited by King George V to form a government, but he deferred to Lloyd George, Secretary of State for War and former Minister of Munitions, who he believed was better placed to lead a coalition ministry. He served in Lloyd George's War Cabinet, first as Chancellor of the Exchequer and Leader of the House of Commons.

While chancellor, he raised the stamp duty on cheques from one penny to twopence in 1918. His promotion reflected the great mutual trust between the two leaders and made for a well co-ordinated political partnership; their coalition was re-elected by a landslide following the Armistice. Law's two eldest sons were both killed whilst fighting in the war. In the 1918 general election, Law returned to Glasgow and was elected as member for Glasgow Central.

== Post-war and prime minister ==
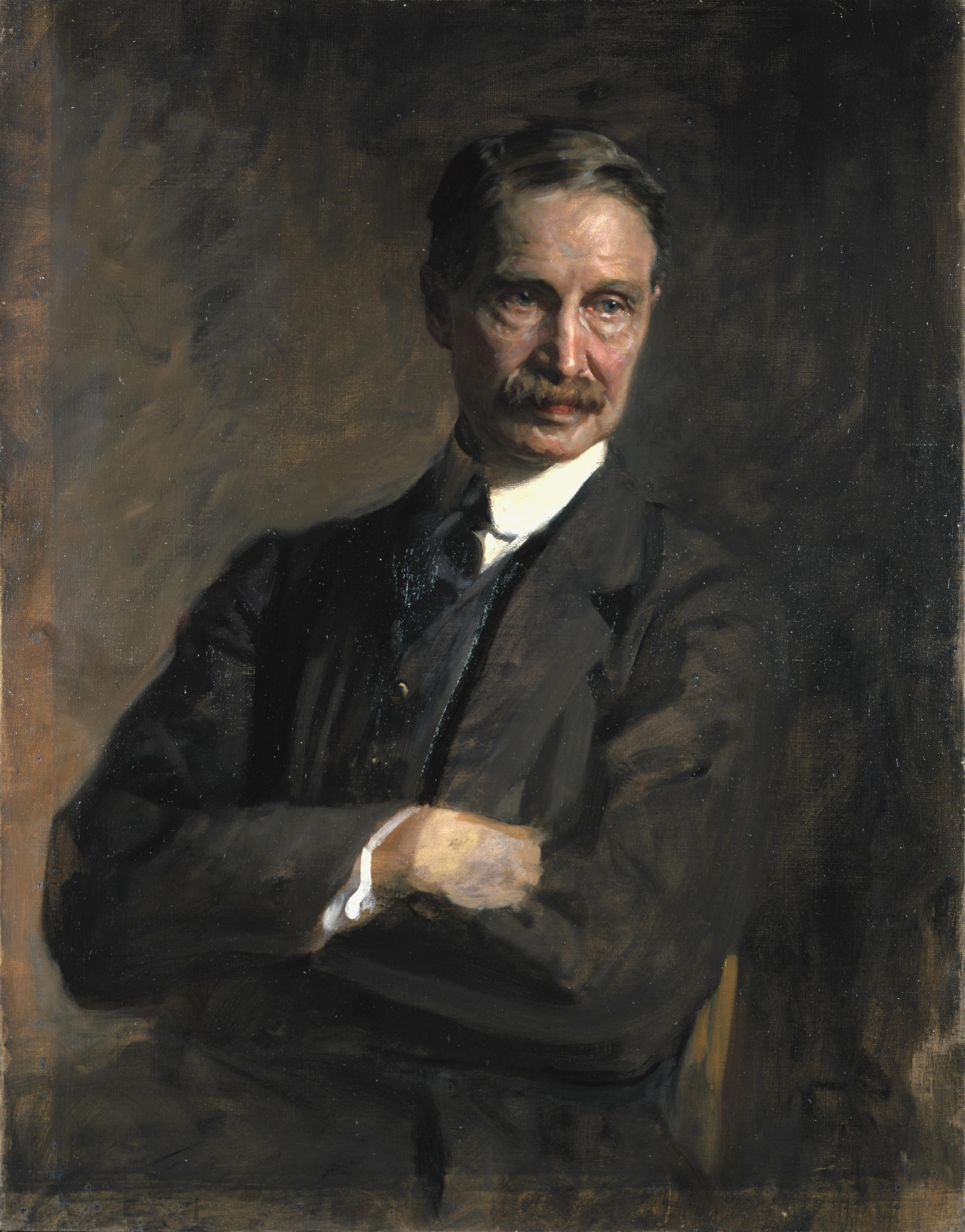
Andrew Bonar Law by James Guthrie (1924)

At war's end, Law gave up the Exchequer for the less demanding sinecure office of Lord Privy Seal but remained Leader of the Commons. Concerning the violence occurring in Ireland, Law felt the continued, strong military efforts (coercion) should be the government's only policy. In January 1921 he stated that 10 years of quiet was the most that could be hoped for in Ireland and that "the Irish were an inferior race." In 1921, ill health forced his resignation as Conservative leader and Leader of the Commons in favour of Austen Chamberlain. His departure weakened the hardliners in the cabinet who were opposed to negotiating with the Irish Republican Army, and the Anglo-Irish War ended in the summer.

By 1921–22, the coalition had become embroiled in an air of moral and financial corruption (e.g. the sale of honours). Besides the recent Irish Treaty and Edwin Montagu's moves towards greater self-government for India, both of which dismayed rank-and-file Conservative opinion, the government's willingness to intervene against the Bolshevik regime in Russia also seemed out of step with the new and more pacifist mood. A sharp slump in 1921 and a wave of strikes in the coal and railway industries also added to the government's unpopularity, as did the apparent failure of the Genoa Conference, which ended in an apparent rapprochement between Germany and Soviet Russia. In other words, it was no longer the case that Lloyd George was an electoral asset to the Conservative Party.

Lloyd George, Birkenhead and Winston Churchill (still distrusted by many Conservatives) wished to use armed force against Turkey (the Chanak Crisis), but had to back down when offered support only by New Zealand and Newfoundland, and not Canada, Australia or the Union of South Africa; Law wrote to The Times in support of the government, but stating that Britain could not "act as the policeman for the world".

At a meeting at the Carlton Club, Conservative backbenchers, led by the President of the Board of Trade Stanley Baldwin and influenced by the recent Newport by-election, which was won from the Liberals by a Conservative, voted to end the Lloyd George Coalition and fight the next election as an independent party. Austen Chamberlain resigned as Party Leader, Lloyd George resigned as prime minister and Law took both jobs on 23 October 1922.

Many leading Conservatives (e.g. Birkenhead, Arthur Balfour, Austen Chamberlain, Robert Horne) were not members of the new Cabinet, which Birkenhead contemptuously referred to as "the Second Eleven". Although the Coalition Conservatives numbered no more than thirty, they hoped to dominate any future Coalition government in the same way that the similarly sized Peelite group had dominated the Coalition Government of 1852–1855 – an analogy much used at the time.

Parliament was immediately dissolved, and a General Election ensued. Besides the two Conservative factions, the Labour Party were fighting as a major national party for the first time and indeed became the main Opposition after the election; the Liberals were still split into Asquith and Lloyd George factions, with many Lloyd George Liberals still unopposed by Conservative candidates (including Churchill, who was defeated at Dundee nonetheless). Despite the confused political arena the Conservatives were re-elected with a comfortable majority.

Questions were raised about whether the elderly Conservative Party Treasurer, Lord Farquhar, had passed on to Lloyd George (who during his premiership had amassed a large fund, largely from the sale of honours) any money intended for the Conservative Party. The Coalition Conservatives also hoped to obtain Conservative Party money from Farquhar. Bonar Law found Farquhar too "gaga" to properly explain what had happened, and dismissed him.

One of the questions which taxed Law's brief government was that of inter-Allied war debts. Britain owed money to the US, and in turn was owed four times as much money by France, Italy and the other Allied powers, although under the Lloyd George government Balfour had promised that Britain would collect no more money from other Allies than she was required to repay the United States; the debt was hard to repay as trade (exports were needed to earn foreign currency) had not returned to prewar levels.

On a trip to the United States, Stanley Baldwin, the inexperienced Chancellor of the Exchequer, agreed to repay £40 million per annum to the United States rather than the £25 million which the British government had thought feasible, and on his return announced the deal to the press when his ship docked at Southampton, before the Cabinet had had a chance to consider it. Law contemplated resignation, and after being talked out of it by senior ministers vented his feelings in an anonymous letter to The Times.

== Resignation and death ==
Law was soon diagnosed with terminal throat cancer and, no longer physically able to speak in Parliament, resigned on 20 May 1923. King George V sent for Baldwin, whom Law is rumoured to have favoured over Lord Curzon. However Law did not offer any advice to the King. Law died later that same year in London at the age of 65.

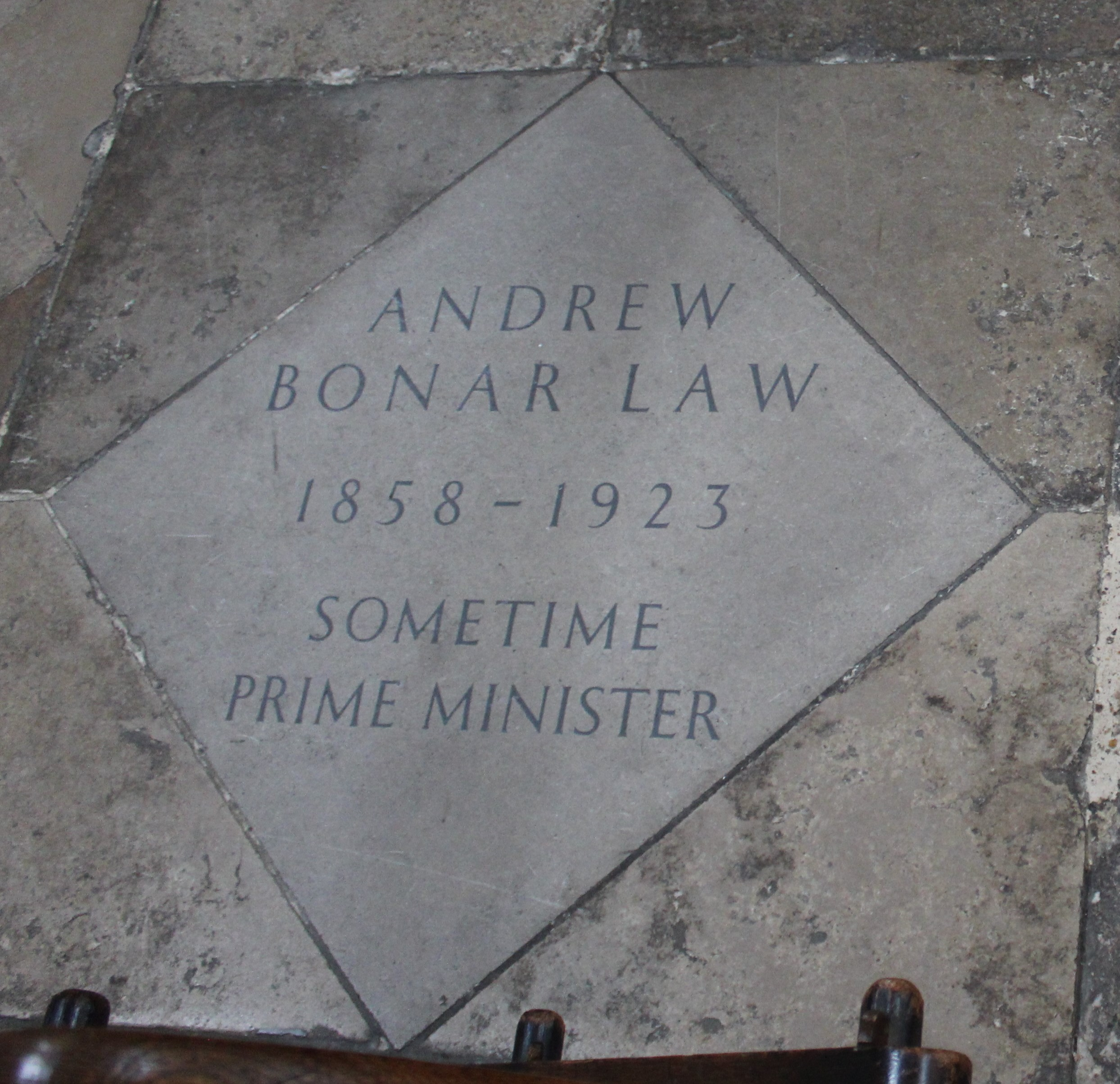
Bonar Law's grave in Westminster Abbey

His funeral was held at Westminster Abbey where later his ashes were interred. He was the first British prime minister to be cremated. His estate was probated at £35,736 (approximately £1,900,000 as of 2025).

Bonar Law was the shortest-serving prime minister of the 20th century. He is often referred to as "the unknown prime minister", not least because of a biography of that title by Robert Blake; the name comes from a remark by Asquith at Law's funeral, that they were burying the Unknown Prime Minister next to the Tomb of the Unknown Soldier.

A tiny hamlet in the municipality of Stirling-Rawdon, Ontario, Canada, is named Bonarlaw after the British prime minister. It had been known as "Big Springs" and then "Bellview". The Bonar Law Memorial High School in Bonar Law's birthplace, Five Rivers, New Brunswick, Canada, is also named in his honour. Additionally, the Bonar Law-Bennett Building, a former University of New Brunswick campus library which now houses the Provincial Archives of New Brunswick, was named after both Law and R. B. Bennett.

== Bonar Law's government, October 1922 – May 1923 ==
- Bonar Law – Prime Minister and Leader of the House of Commons
- Lord Cave – Lord Chancellor
- Lord Salisbury – Lord President of the Council and Chancellor of the Duchy of Lancaster
- Stanley Baldwin – Chancellor of the Exchequer
- William Clive Bridgeman – Secretary of State for the Home Department
- Lord Curzon of Kedleston – Secretary of State for Foreign Affairs and Leader of the House of Lords
- The Duke of Devonshire – Secretary of State for the Colonies
- Lord Derby – Secretary of State for War
- Lord Peel – Secretary of State for India
- Lord Novar – Secretary for Scotland
- Leo Amery – First Lord of the Admiralty
- Sir Philip Lloyd-Greame – President of the Board of Trade
- Sir Robert Sanders – Minister of Agriculture and Fisheries
- Edward Wood – President of the Board of Education
- Sir Montague Barlow – Minister of Labour
- Sir Arthur Griffith-Boscawen – Minister of Health

=== Changes ===
- April 1923 – Griffith-Boscawen resigned as Minister of Health after losing his seat and was replaced by Neville Chamberlain.

== Bibliography ==
- Adams, R. J. Q. (1999). Bonar Law. John Murray. ISBN 0-7195-5422-5.
- Adams, R. J. Q. '"Andrew Bonar Law and the fall of the Asquith Coalition: The December 1916 cabinet crisis," Canadian Journal of History (1997) 32#2 pp 185–200 online
- Lord Beaverbrook (1963). The Decline and Fall of Lloyd George. London: Collins.
- Birkenhead, Frederick E. (1977). Contemporary Personalities. Ayer Publishing. ISBN 0-8369-0061-8.
- Blake, Robert. The Unknown Prime Minister: The Life and Times of Andrew Bonar Law, 1858–1923 (London: Eyre and Spottiswoode, 1955) online
- Charmley, John. A History of Conservative Politics, 1900–1996 London: Macmillan, 1996)
- Clark, Alan. The Tories: Conservatives and the Nation State, 1922–1997, (London: Weidenfeld and Nicolson, 1998)
- Eccleshall, Robert (1998). Biographical dictionary of British prime ministers. Routledge. ISBN 0-415-10830-6.online
- Ensor, Robert (1936). England 1870 – 1914. Clarendon Press. OCLC 400389. online free to borrow
- Kendle, John (1992). Walter Long, Ireland and the Union, 1905–1920. McGill-Queen's Press. ISBN 0-7735-0908-9.
- Kennedy, Thomas (July 2007). "Troubled Tories: Dissent and Confusion concerning the Party's Ulster Policy, 1910–1914". Journal of British Studies. 43 (3): 575–593.
- Laybourn, Keith (2001). British political leaders: a biographical dictionary. ABC-CLIO. ISBN 1-57607-043-3.
- Mackintosh, John Pitcairn (1981). The British Cabinet (3rd ed.). Taylor & Francis. ISBN 0-416-31380-9.
- Malcolm, Ian Zachary (1977). Vacant thrones. Ayer Publishing. ISBN 0-8369-0672-1.
- Mowat, Charles Loch (1978). Britain between the wars: 1918–1940 (2nd ed.). Taylor & Francis. ISBN 0-416-29510-X. online free to borrow
- Pugh, Martin (1974). "Asquith, Bonar Law and the First Coalition". The Historical Journal. 17 (4): 813–836. doi:10.1017/S0018246X00007925. ISSN 0018-246X. S2CID 159640792.
- Raymond, E. T. (2007). Uncensored Celebrities. Read Books. ISBN 978-1-4067-7397-2.
- Sforza, Carlo (1969). Makers of modern Europe: portraits and personal impressions and recollections. Ayer Publishing. ISBN 0-8369-1064-8.
- Smith, Jeremy (1993). "Bluff, Bluster and Brinkmanship: Andrew Bonar Law and the Third Home Rule Bill". The Historical Journal. 36 (1): 161–178. doi:10.1017/S0018246X00016150. ISSN 0018-246X. S2CID 159691644.
- Taylor, Andrew (2006). Bonar Law. Haus Publishing. ISBN 1-904950-59-0.
- Taylor, A. J. P. (1965). English History 1914–1945. Clarendon Press. OCLC 174762876.
- Turner, John (1988). Britain and the First World War. Routledge. ISBN 0-04-445109-1.

Political offices
Preceded by The Earl of Dudley	Parliamentary Secretary to the Board of Trade; 1902–1905	Succeeded by Hudson Kearley
Preceded by Arthur Balfour	Leader of the Opposition; 1911–1915	Succeeded by Sir Edward Carson
Preceded by Lewis Harcourt	Secretary of State for the Colonies; 1915–1916	Succeeded by Walter Long
Preceded by Reginald McKenna	Chancellor of the Exchequer; 1916–1919	Succeeded by Austen Chamberlain
Preceded by H. H. Asquith	Leader of the House of Commons; 1916–1921	Succeeded by Austen Chamberlain
Preceded by The Earl of Crawford and Balcarres	Lord Privy Seal; 1919–1921	Succeeded by Austen Chamberlain
Preceded by David Lloyd George	Prime Minister of the United Kingdom; 23 October 1922 – 20 May 1923	Succeeded by Stanley Baldwin
Preceded by Austen Chamberlain	Leader of the House of Commons; 1922–1923	Succeeded by Stanley Baldwin
Parliament of the United Kingdom
Preceded by Andrew Provand	Member of Parliament for Glasgow Blackfriars and Hutchesontown; 1900 – 1906	Succeeded by George Barnes
Preceded by Frederick Rutherfoord Harris	Member of Parliament for Dulwich; 1906 – 1910	Succeeded by Frederick Hall
Preceded by Thomas Sandys	Member of Parliament for Bootle; 1911 – 1918	Succeeded by Sir Thomas Royden, Bt.
Preceded by John Mackintosh McLeod	Member of Parliament for Glasgow Central; 1918 – 1923	Succeeded by William Alexander
Party political offices
Preceded by Arthur Balfour	Conservative Leader in the Commons; 1911–1921	Succeeded by Austen Chamberlain
Preceded by Austen Chamberlain; The Marquess Curzon of Kedleston	Leader of the Conservative Party; 1922–1923	Succeeded by Stanley Baldwin
Academic offices
Preceded by Raymond Poincaré	Rector of the University of Glasgow; 1919–1922	Succeeded by The Earl of Birkenhead
