= Andrew Provand =

Andrew Provand

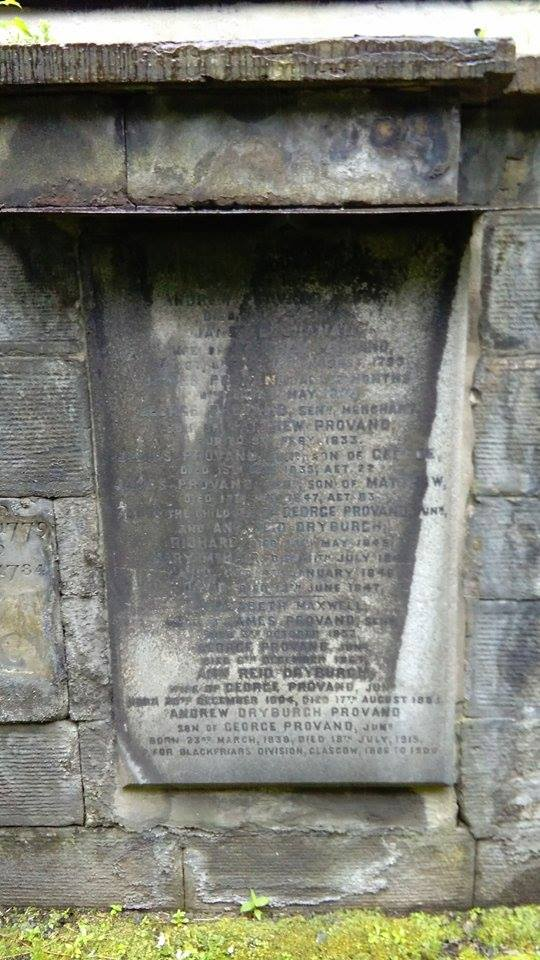
The grave of Andrew Dryburgh Provand, Ramshorn Cemetery, Edinburgh

Andrew Dryburgh Provand (23 March 1838 – 18 July 1915) was a Scottish merchant strongly linked to Manchester; he was also a Liberal Party politician who served as the Member of Parliament (MP) for Glasgow Blackfriars and Hutchesontown from 1886 to 1900. He was a member of the Liberal Imperialist wing of the Liberal Party, and had joined The Liberal Imperial Council prior to the 1900 election.

== Background ==
Provand was the son of George Provand, a Glasgow merchant and his wife Ann Reid Dryburgh. He never married.

== Career ==
He won the seat in 1886, but lost it fourteen years later at the 1900 general election to future Prime Minister, Bonar Law. He unsuccessfully contested the same seat again in 1906. During his time in Parliament, he was involved in debates over land taxation.

In 1889 he was a director of the Chignecto Marine Transport Railway Company Ltd. In 1891 he was one of the founder shareholders in The Blackpool Tower Company Ltd.

He died on 18 July 1915 and is buried in the graveyard at the Ramshorn Church (now known as Ramshorn Cemetery on Ingram Street in Glasgow. The grave lies on the eastern boundary wall.

Parliament of the United Kingdom
Preceded by Mitchell Henry	Member of Parliament for Glasgow Blackfriars & Hutchesontown; 1886–1900	Succeeded by Bonar Law
