= James Shaw Maxwell =

Scottish politician (1855–1928)

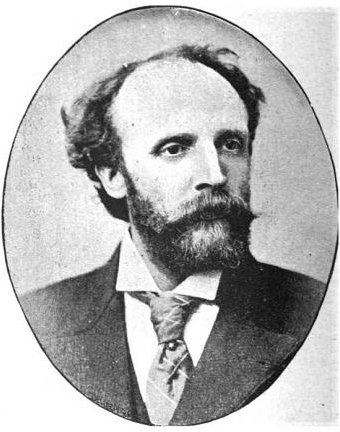
Shaw Maxwell in the 1890s.

James Shaw Maxwell (1855–1928), known as Shaw Maxwell, was a Scottish socialist activist.

Born in Glasgow, as the son of Janet Maxwell, née Shaw, and the fruiterer and merchant James Taylor Maxwell, James Shaw Maxwell served his apprenticeship as a printer and lithographer. He worked as a lithographer and journalist, and joined the Liberal Party. He left the Liberals in 1880 in opposition to their local opposition to Irish nationalism, and became a leading supporter of Henry George and an activist in the Scottish Land Restoration League.

Maxwell stood unsuccessfully for Glasgow Blackfriars and Hutchesontown at the 1885 general election. In 1888, he attended the founding meeting of the Scottish Labour Party and was appointed as the first chairman of its executive. Along with most of the organisation's members, he joined the Independent Labour Party (ILP) on its formation in 1893, and served as its first Secretary. He stood again in Blackfriars and Hutchesontown at the 1895 general election, this time for the ILP, and again without success. However, he did manage to get elected to Glasgow City Council in 1896. He led a successful campaign for free libraries in the city, and for the opening of museums and art galleries on Sundays, to increase the number of workers able to attend.

Party political offices
Preceded by New post	Secretary of the Independent Labour Party; 1893–1894	Succeeded by Tom Mann
