= Andrew Constable, Lord Constable =

Scottish advocate, judge and Conservative politician (1865–1928)

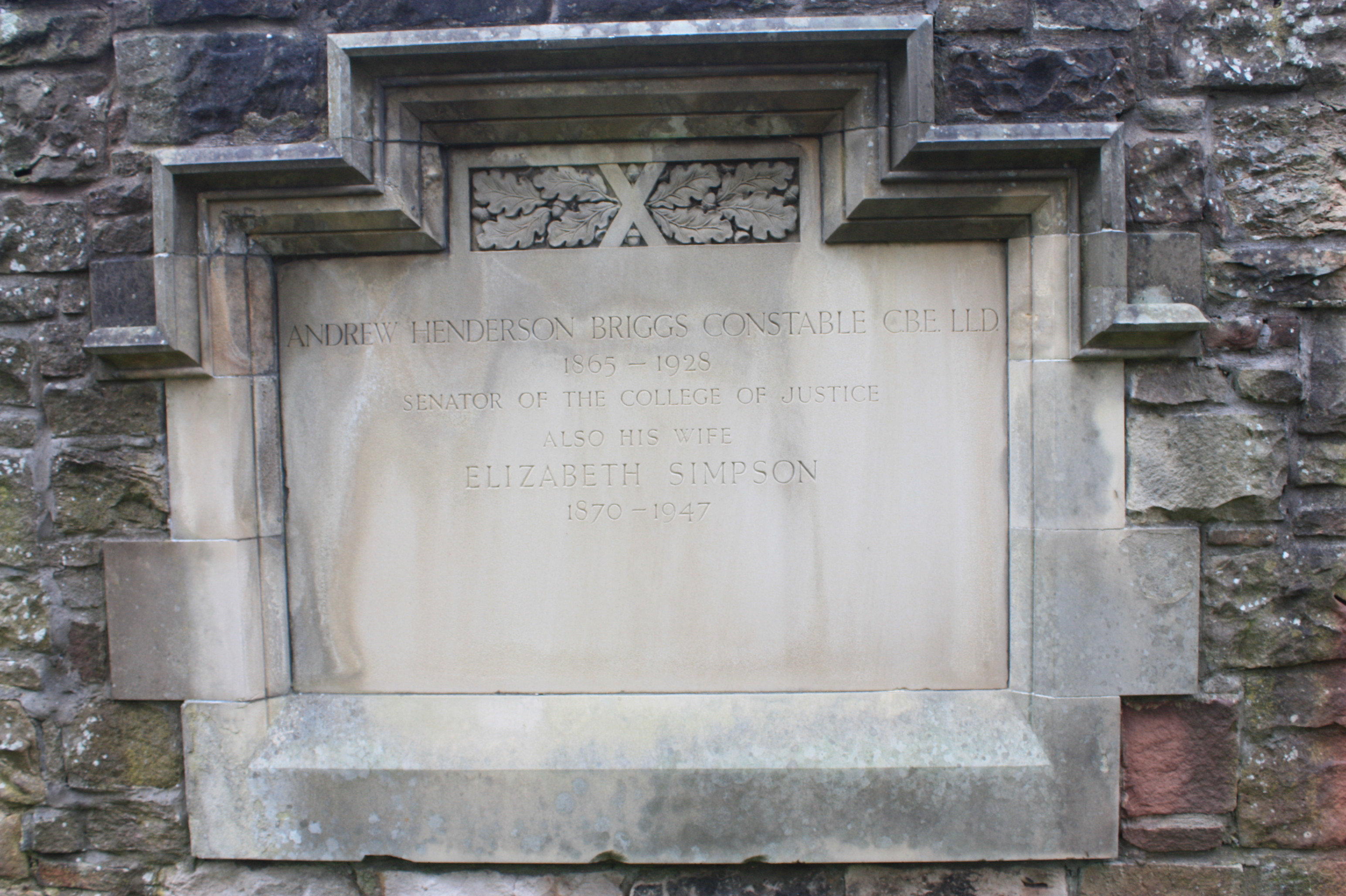
The grave of Andrew Constable, Lord Constable, Dean Cemetery

Arthur Henderson Briggs "Andrew" Constable, Lord Constable CBE, FRSE (3 March 1865 – 4 November 1928) was a Scottish advocate, judge and Conservative politician. He served as Dean of Faculty and as Solicitor General.

== Life ==
He was born in Benarty, Fife, the son of William Briggs Constable. He was educated at Dollar Academy and the University of Edinburgh, where he was Vans Dunlop Scholar in Political Economy. He was admitted as an advocate in 1889 and appointed a King's Counsel in 1908.

He was unsuccessful Conservative parliamentary candidate for East Fife in 1900, Kirkcaldy Burghs in 1906, Montrose Burghs in 1908 and Glasgow Blackfriars in 1910. At this time he was living at 23 Royal Circus.

He served as Sheriff of Caithness from 1917 to 1920 and of Sheriff of Argyll from February–May 1920, when he was appointed Dean of the Faculty of Advocates.

He briefly served as Solicitor General for Scotland from March to June 1922. In July 1922 he was appointed a Senator of the College of Justice, succeeding Lord Salvesen, and took the judicial title Lord Constable.

He was created a Commander of the Order of the British Empire (CBE) in the 1920 New Year Honours.

In 1925 he was elected a Fellow of the Royal Society of Edinburgh, his proposers were Sir James Alfred Ewing, Sir Thomas Hudson Beare, Sir Harold Jalland Stiles, and William Wilson.

He is buried in a row of modern law lords against the north wall of the 20th century extension to Dean Cemetery in Edinburgh.

== Publications ==
- Treatise on Provisional Orders (1900)

== Family ==
In 1895 he married Elizabeth Simpson (1870–1947).

Legal offices
Preceded by Charles David Murray	Solicitor General for Scotland; March–June 1922	Succeeded by William Watson
