= Glasgow Blackfriars and Hutchesontown =

Parliamentary constituency in the United Kingdom, 1885–1918

- Former burgh constituency for the House of Commons
- Subdivision: City and royal burgh of Glasgow; County of city of Glasgow

1885–1918
- Seats: One
- Created from: Glasgow
- Replaced by: Glasgow Central

Glasgow Blackfriars and Hutchesontown, representing parts of the city of Glasgow, Scotland, was a burgh constituency represented in the House of Commons of the Parliament of the United Kingdom from 1885 until 1918.

It elected one Member of Parliament (MP) using the first-past-the-post voting system.

== Boundaries ==
The Redistribution of Seats Act 1885 provided that the constituency was to consist of the sixth and fourteenth Municipal Wards.

The constituency was described in the Glasgow Parliamentary Divisions Act 1896 as being-

"In the first place, the area within a line beginning at a point in the centre of Albert Bridge, where the same intersects the centre of the River Clyde, northwards along the centre of that bridge, Saltmarket and High Street, to a point opposite the centre of Rottenrow; thence westwards along the centre of Rottenrow to the centre of John Street; thence southwards along the centre of John Street to the centre of Ingram Street; thence westwards along the centre of Ingram Street to a point opposite the centre of Glassford Street; thence southwards along the centres of Glassford Street, Stockwell Street, and the line of Victoria Bridge to a point where the same intersects the centre of the River Clyde; thence eastwards along the centre of the River Clyde to the centre of the line of Albert Bridge, the point first described. And, in the second place, the area within a line beginning at a point in the centre of the River Clyde immediately opposite the centre line of Thistle Street; southwards along the centre of Thistle Street to the centre of Caledonia Road; thence eastwards along the centre of Caledonia Road to the centre of Crown Street; thence southwards along the centres of Crown Street and Cathcart Road to a point where the said road is intersected by the southern parliamentary boundary of the city; thence following the said boundary in an easterly, westerly, and northerly direction till it reaches the centre of the River Clyde; thence along the centre of the River Clyde in a westerly, northerly, and westerly direction, until it reaches the point therein opposite the centre of Thistle Street first described."

== Members of Parliament ==
Election	Member	Party
1885	Mitchell Henry	Liberal
1886	Mitchell Henry	Liberal Unionist
1886	Andrew Provand	Liberal
1900	Bonar Law	Conservative
1906	George Barnes	Labour
1918	constituency abolished	

== Election results 1885-1918 ==
=== Elections in the 1880s ===
Henry

General election 1885: Glasgow Blackfriars and Hutchesontown
Party	Candidate	Votes	%	±%
Liberal	Mitchell Henry	3,759	46.6	
Conservative	William Charles Maughan	3,137	39.0	
Scottish Land Restoration	James Shaw Maxwell	1,156	14.4	
Majority		622	7.6	
Turnout		8,052	82.8	
Registered electors		9,725		
Liberal win (new seat)				

General election 1886: Glasgow Blackfriars and Hutchesontown
Party	Candidate	Votes	%	±%
Liberal	Andrew Provand	4,201	55.7	+9.1
Liberal Unionist	Mitchell Henry	3,337	44.3	+5.3
Majority		864	11.4	+3.8
Turnout		7,538	77.5	−5.3
Registered electors		9,725		
Liberal hold		Swing	+1.9	

=== Elections in the 1890s ===
Provand

General election 1892: Glasgow Blackfriars and Hutchesontown
Party	Candidate	Votes	%	±%
Liberal	Andrew Provand	4,146	57.5	+1.8
Conservative	Alexander Stuart (jun.)	3,065	42.5	−1.8
Majority		1,081	15.0	+3.6
Turnout		7,211	76.6	−0.9
Registered electors		9,408		
Liberal hold		Swing	+1.8	

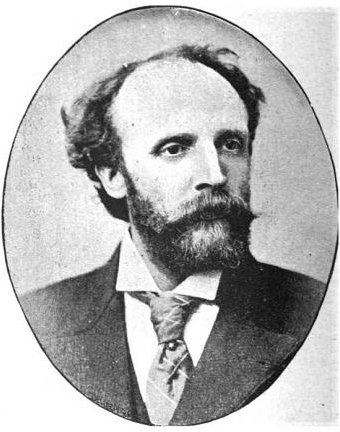
Maxwell

General election 1895: Glasgow Blackfriars and Hutchesontown
Party	Candidate	Votes	%	±%
Liberal	Andrew Provand	3,108	49.5	−8.0
Liberal Unionist	Alexander Stuart (jun.)	2,727	43.4	+0.9
Ind. Labour Party	James Shaw Maxwell	448	7.1	New
Majority		381	6.1	−8.9
Turnout		6,283	62.3	−14.3
Registered electors		10,084		
Liberal hold		Swing	-4.4	

=== Elections in the 1900s ===
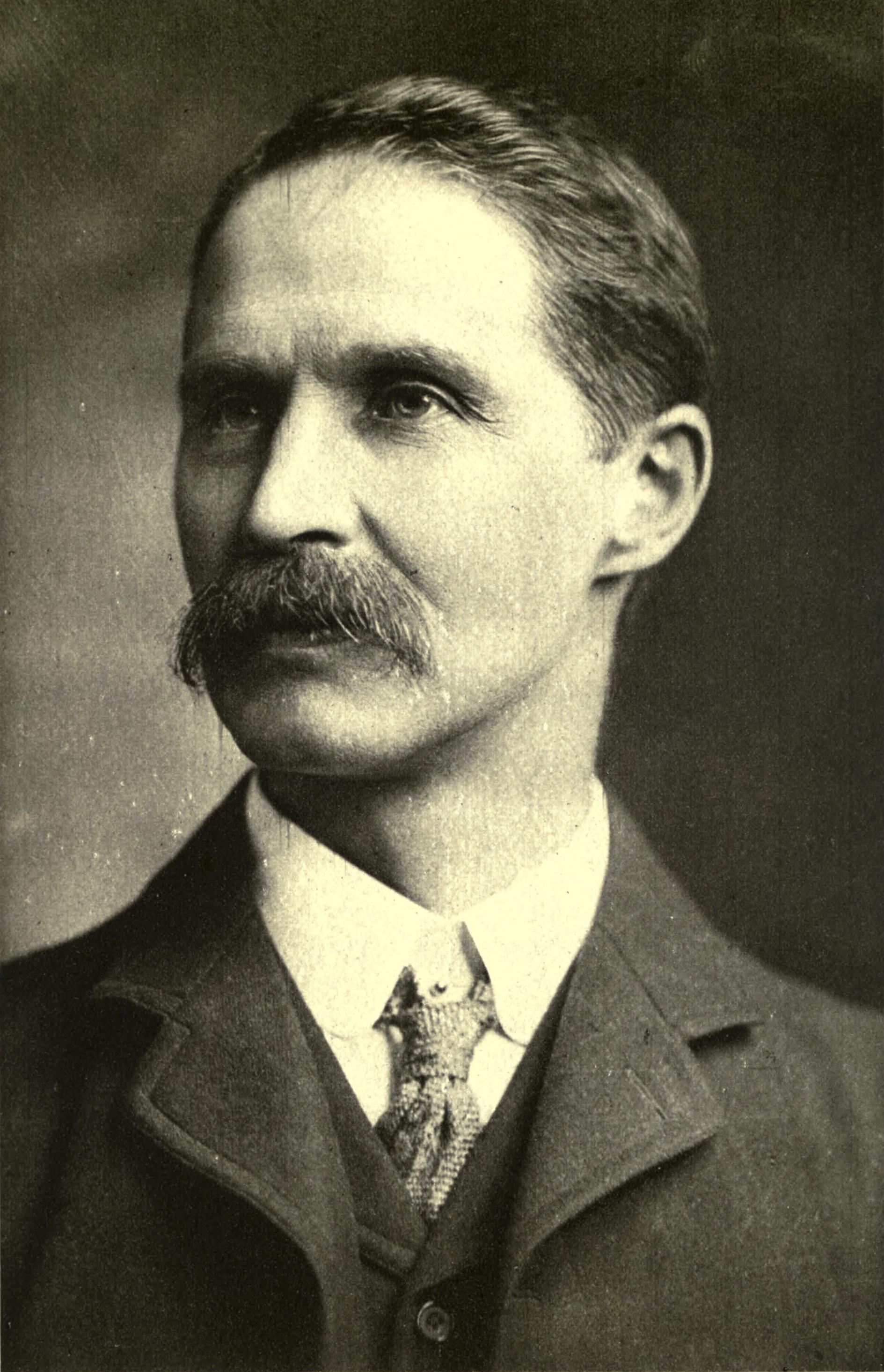
Bonar Law

General election 1900: Glasgow Blackfriars and Hutchesontown
Party	Candidate	Votes	%	±%
Conservative	Bonar Law	4,130	56.8	+13.4
Liberal	Andrew Provand	3,140	43.2	−6.3
Majority		990	13.6	N/A
Turnout		7,270	70.6	+8.3
Registered electors		10,304		
Conservative gain from Liberal		Swing	+9.8	

General election 1906: Glasgow Blackfriars and Hutchesontown
Party	Candidate	Votes	%	±%
Labour Repr. Cmte.	George Barnes	3,284	39.5	New
Conservative	Bonar Law	2,974	35.8	−21.0
Liberal	Andrew Provand	2,058	24.7	−18.5
Majority		310	3.7	N/A
Turnout		8,316	85.2	+14.6
Registered electors		9,761		
Labour Repr. Cmte. gain from Conservative		Swing		

=== Elections in the 1910s ===
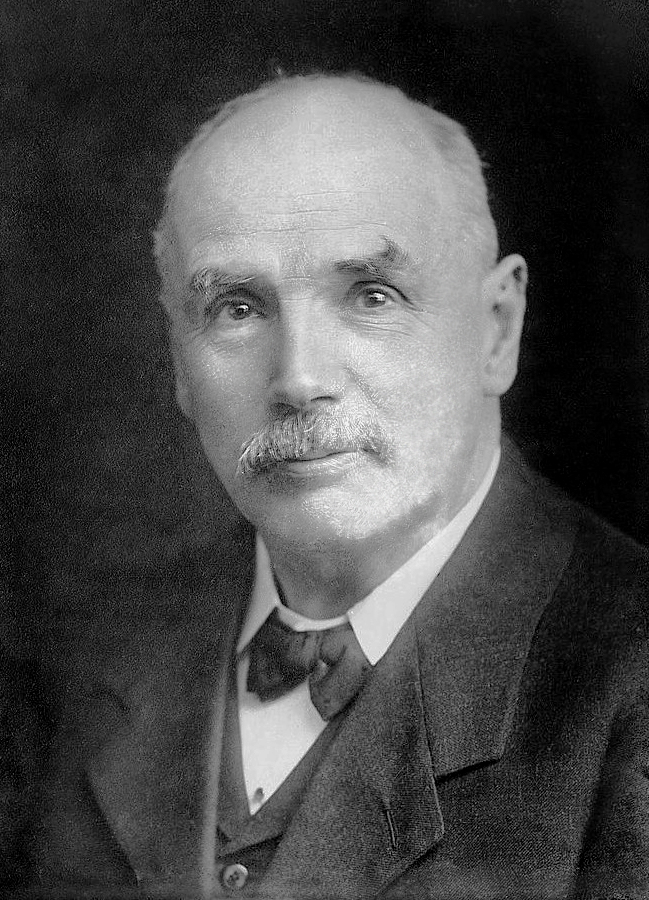
Barnes

General election January 1910: Glasgow Blackfriars and Hutchesontown
Party	Candidate	Votes	%	±%
Labour	George Barnes	4,496	61.7	+22.2
Conservative	Andrew Constable	2,796	38.3	+2.5
Majority		1,700	23.4	+19.7
Turnout		7,292	86.0	+0.8
Labour hold		Swing	+9.8	

General election December 1910: Glasgow Blackfriars and Hutchesontown
Party	Candidate	Votes	%	±%
Labour	George Barnes	4,162	59.1	−2.6
Conservative	Andrew Constable	2,884	40.9	+2.6
Majority		1,278	18.2	−5.2
Turnout		7,046	81.6	−4.4
Labour hold		Swing	-2.6	

General Election 1914–15:

Another General Election was required to take place before the end of 1915. The political parties had been making preparations for an election to take place and by July 1914, the following candidates had been selected;

- Labour: George Barnes
- Unionist: James Lovat-Fraser
