= Mitchell Henry =

British politician (1826–1910)

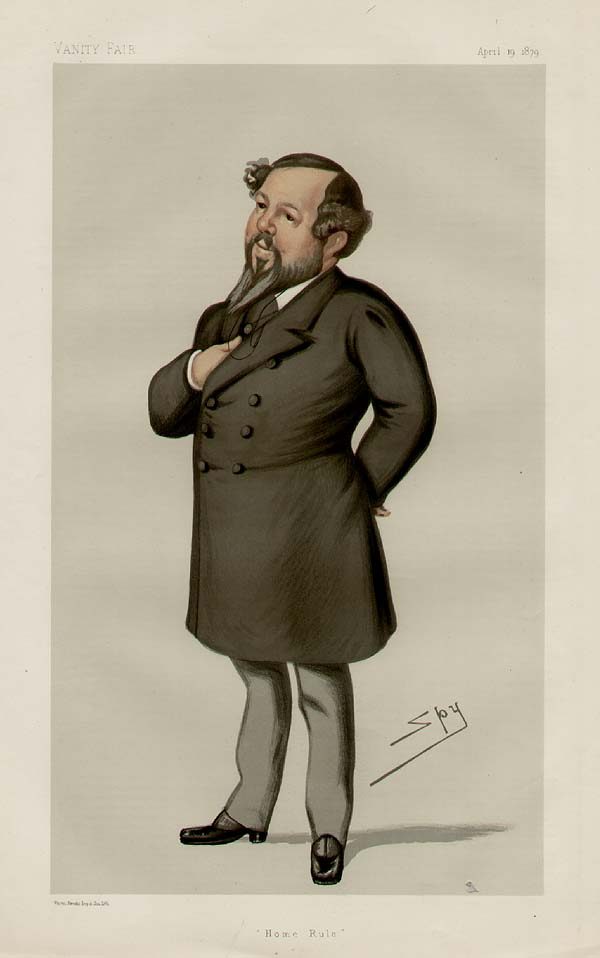
"Home Rule". Caricature by Spy published in Vanity Fair in 1879.

Mitchell Henry (1826 – 22 November 1910) was an English financier, politician and Member of Parliament (MP) in the House of Commons of the United Kingdom of Great Britain and Ireland. He was MP for County Galway from 1871 to 1885, and for Glasgow Blackfriars and Hutchesontown from 1885 to 1886.

== Biography ==

Mitchell Henry was the second son of Alexander Henry (1784–1862) of Woodlands, near Manchester, England, a very affluent cotton merchant, founder of A & S Henry & Co Ltd and Member of Parliament for South Lancashire from 1847 to 1852, who was married to Elizabeth, daughter of George Brush of Willowbrook, Killinchy, County Down, and a supporter of the Anti-Corn Law League. Mitchell's elder brother, John Snowden Henry, born in 1824, became a magistrate for the County of Southampton.

Mitchell Henry was born at Ardwick Green, Manchester and privately educated and read for a degree in medicine at the Pine Street school of medicine in Manchester. He graduated M.R.C.S. in 1847 and having established himself in practice as a consulting surgeon at No. 5 Harley Street, Cavendish Square and then as a surgeon in the North London Infirmary of Diseases of the Eye. In 1857 he was next appointed surgeon to Middlesex Hospital. He also became a Fellow of the Royal College of Surgeons.

After the death of his father in 1862, Mitchell Henry abandoned his career in medicine and returned to his native Manchester to run the family business. In 1863, he purchased Stratheden House in London. He soon became involved in politics and contested Woodstock for the Liberals in 1865, and stood in the 1867 Manchester by-election, and the 1868 general election, as a moderate Liberal, but was well-beaten in both contests. As part of his candidature in 1868 Henry started up the Manchester Evening News, though it passed out of his hands at the end of the election. He was particularly interested in the cause for a better health provision for the poor.

In an 1871 by-election he was returned MP for County Galway, and supported Home Rule for Ireland. He opposed Gladstone's Irish university bill, chiefly on the ground that it did not concede the principle of sectarian education demanded by public opinion in Ireland. Having broken with the Irish Parliamentary Party in 1884, in 1885 he was elected Liberal MP for the Blackfriars Division of Glasgow, but defeat the following year when standing as a Liberal Unionist spelt the end of his parliamentary career. In 1889 the firm of A. & S. Henry was turned into a limited liability company, of which Henry was chairman till 1893. (A. & S. Henry was later taken over by Great Universal Stores.)

Maintaining two expensive properties seriously depleted Henry's resources. Stratheden was sold around 1900, and pulled down to make way for a block of apartments. Kylemore was sold to William Montagu, 9th Duke of Manchester in 1903. Henry died in November 1910, at his home in Leamington in Warwickshire.

== Kylemore Castle ==
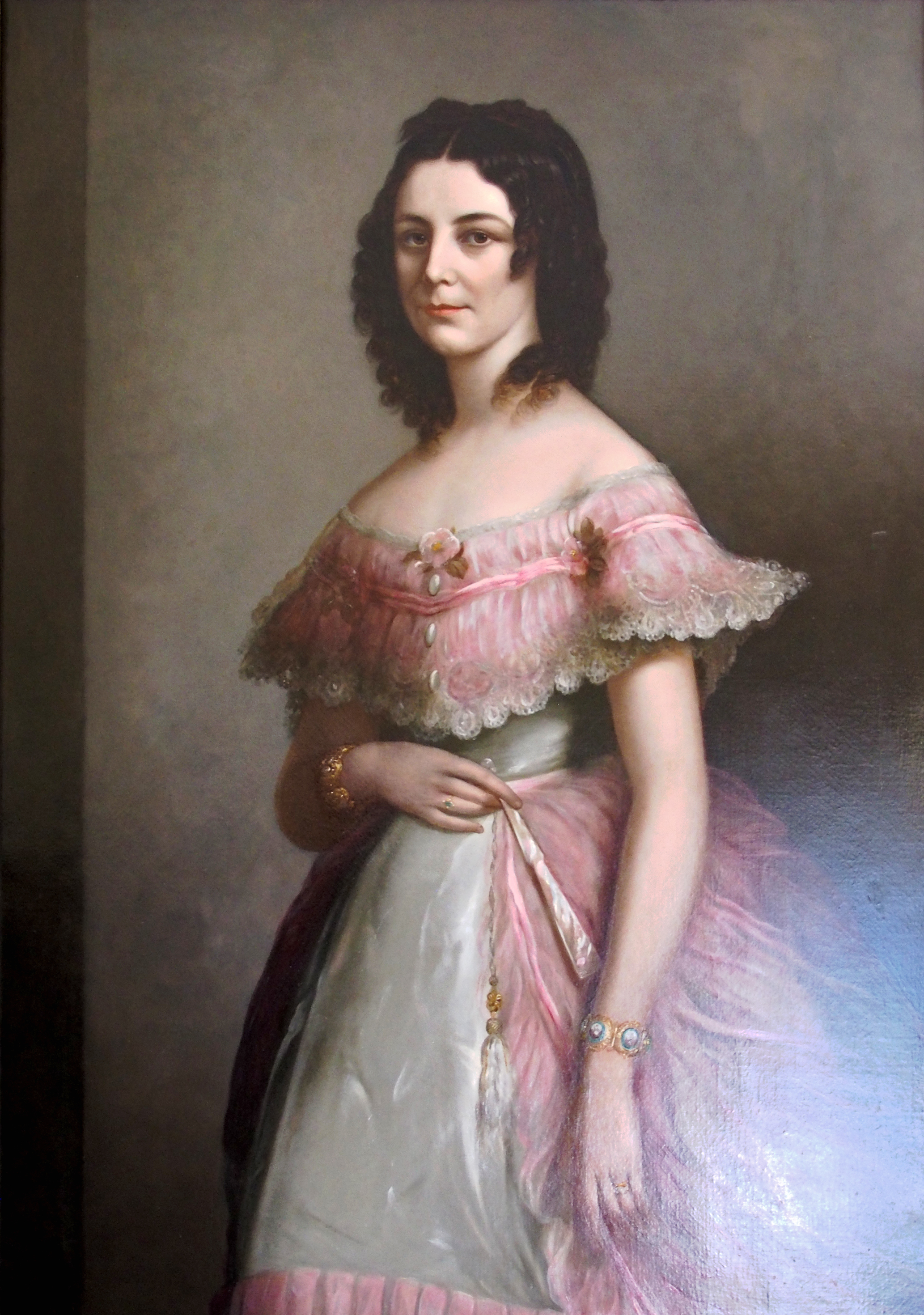
Portrait of Margaret Henry (at Kylemore Abbey)

On August 30, 1849, Henry married Margaret Vaughan (d. 1874) of Quilly House, County Down in St. Peter's Church, Dublin by Margaret's maternal uncle, Rev. Tyrell. They had nine children, five daughters and four sons:

- John Lewis (1850-1904)
- Margaret Vaughn (1852-1940)
- Marie Katherine (b. 1855)
- Alexander (b. 1857) established a fire brigade at Kylemore
- Forward (1864-1948)
- Geraldine (1865-1892) died 1892 in an accident while driving a pony and trap near Derryinver.
- Lorenzo Mitchell-Henry (1866-1965)
- Violet (1868-1958)
- Florence (1870-1952) received an OBE, for service in support of the troops during World War I.

Henry was an enthusiastic angler, and his interest in the sport brought him frequently to the west of Ireland. Henry and his bride spent part of their honeymoon in Connemara. After he came into his inheritance, he returned and purchased from the Blakes, Kylemore Lodge, a large estate of some 14,000 acres. Much of the estate was bogland, which he reclaimed at substantial expense. He built Kylemore Castle (now Kylemore Abbey), overlooking the lough, between 1863 and 1868. the house ha eight acres of gardens, growing fruits and vegetables. Kylemore provided employment in a remote section of Galway; Henry also built a school for the children of his tenants.

On December 4, 1874, Margaret died of a fever contracted while visiting Egypt. After this Mitchell did not spend so much time at Kylemore, although he kept it going. However, he built a beautiful memorial church a short distance from the house on the shore of the lake. Margaret was laid to rest nearby in a mausoleum, where in due course he joined her. The church is a miniature replica of a gothic cathedral, the inside features coloured marble from each of the 4 provinces of Ireland.

== Arms ==
Coat of arms of Mitchell Henry
| Notes Confirmed by John Bernard Burke, Ulster King of Arms, 12 November 1863. Crest Out of a crown Proper a demi-lion rampant Argent holding between the paws a ducal coronet Or. Escutcheon Per pale indented Argent and Gules on the dexter side a rose of the second a chief Azure charged with a lion passant of the first. Motto Vincit Veritas |

Parliament of the United Kingdom
| Preceded by Hubert de Burgh-Canning | MP for County Galway; 1871–1885 | Succeeded by John Philip Nolan |
| New constituency | MP for Glasgow Blackfriars & Hutchesontown; 1885–1886 | Succeeded by Andrew Dryburgh Provand |
