= Bonar Law-Bennett Building =

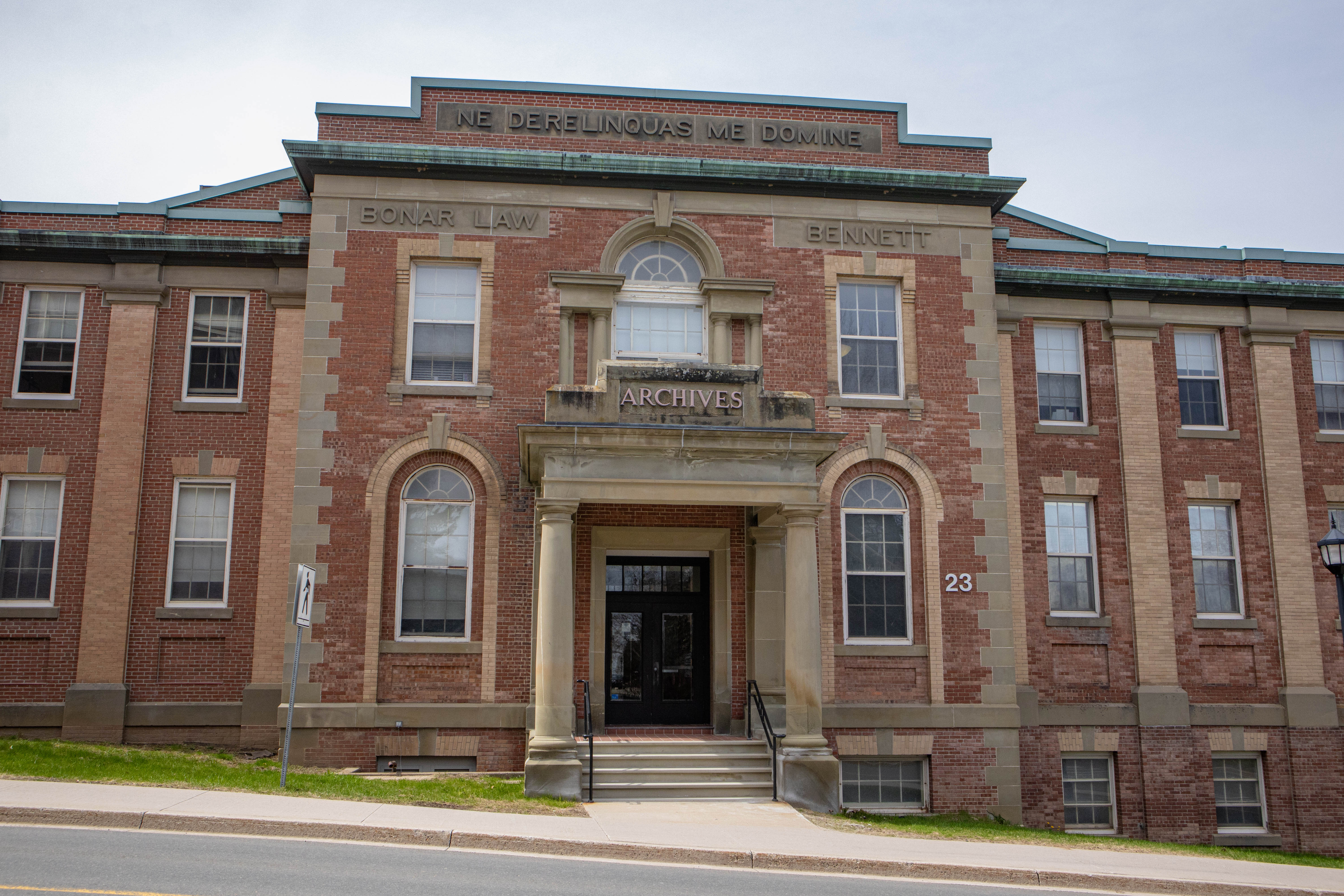
- 45.9489°N 66.6433°W
- Location: 23 Dineen Drive, University of New Brunswick, Fredericton, New Brunswick
- Type: Academic library
- Established: May 1931; 95 years ago

The Bonar Law-Bennett Building is a former academic library for the University of New Brunswick and the current home of the Provincial Archives of New Brunswick.

The building was named the Bonar Law-Bennett Library by Max Aitken, 1st Baron Beaverbrook, after Bonar Law and R. B. Bennett, both prominent New Brunswick-born politicians who served as Prime Minister of the United Kingdom and Prime Minister of Canada, respectively.

== History ==
Construction on the building first began in 1929 under funding by the provincial government for the University of New Brunswick (UNB), designed by architect H. Claire Mott. Initially named University Library, the building was completed and opened for use in January 1931, and officially opened in May 1931 by then-premier, John Babington Macaulay Baxter. In 1951, the building was expanded to add a new wing with $250,000 in funding provided by Max Aitken, 1st Baron Beaverbrook in 1948, who additionally had the building renamed to the Bonar Law-Bennett Library upon its official re-opening on May 15, 1951.

In early May 1967, UNB began relocating its libraries to the new Harriet Irving Library. The building was sold to the provincial government and used as the New Brunswick Archives and Historical Resources Building, later known as the Provincial Archives of New Brunswick (PANB). PANB officially opened in the building on May 29, 1968.
