= 1871 County Galway by-election =

UK Parliamentary by-election

The 1871 County Galway by-election was held on 21 February 1871. The by-election was held due to the resignation of the incumbent Liberal MP, Hubert de Burgh-Canning. It was won by the unopposed pro Home Rule candidate Mitchell Henry. The gain was retained in the 1874 general election.
