= Provincial Archives of New Brunswick =

Official archives of New Brunswick, Canada

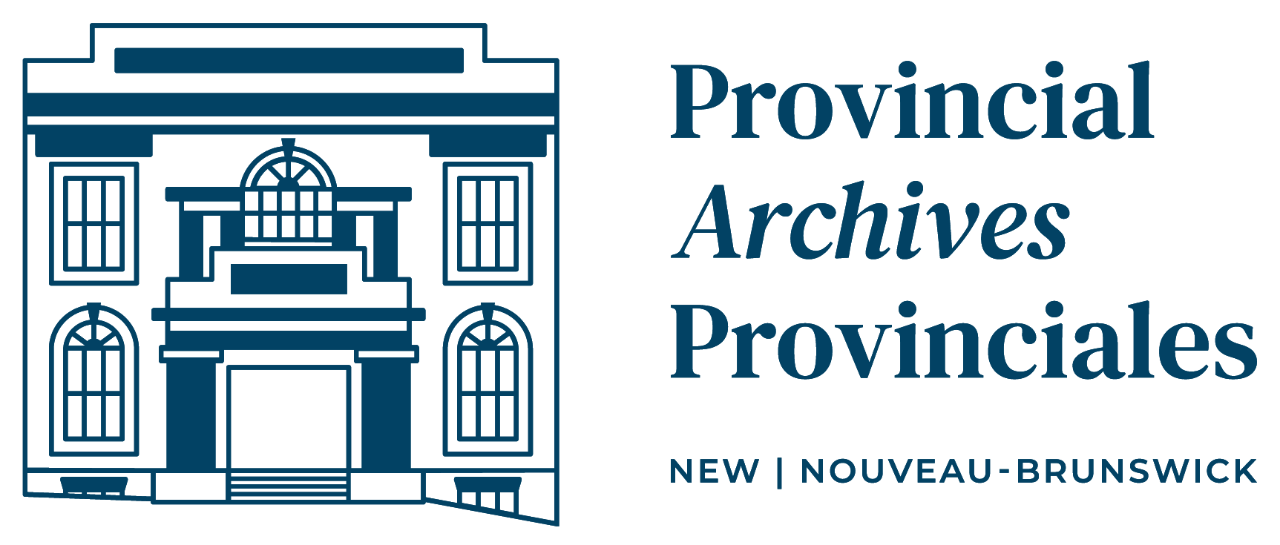

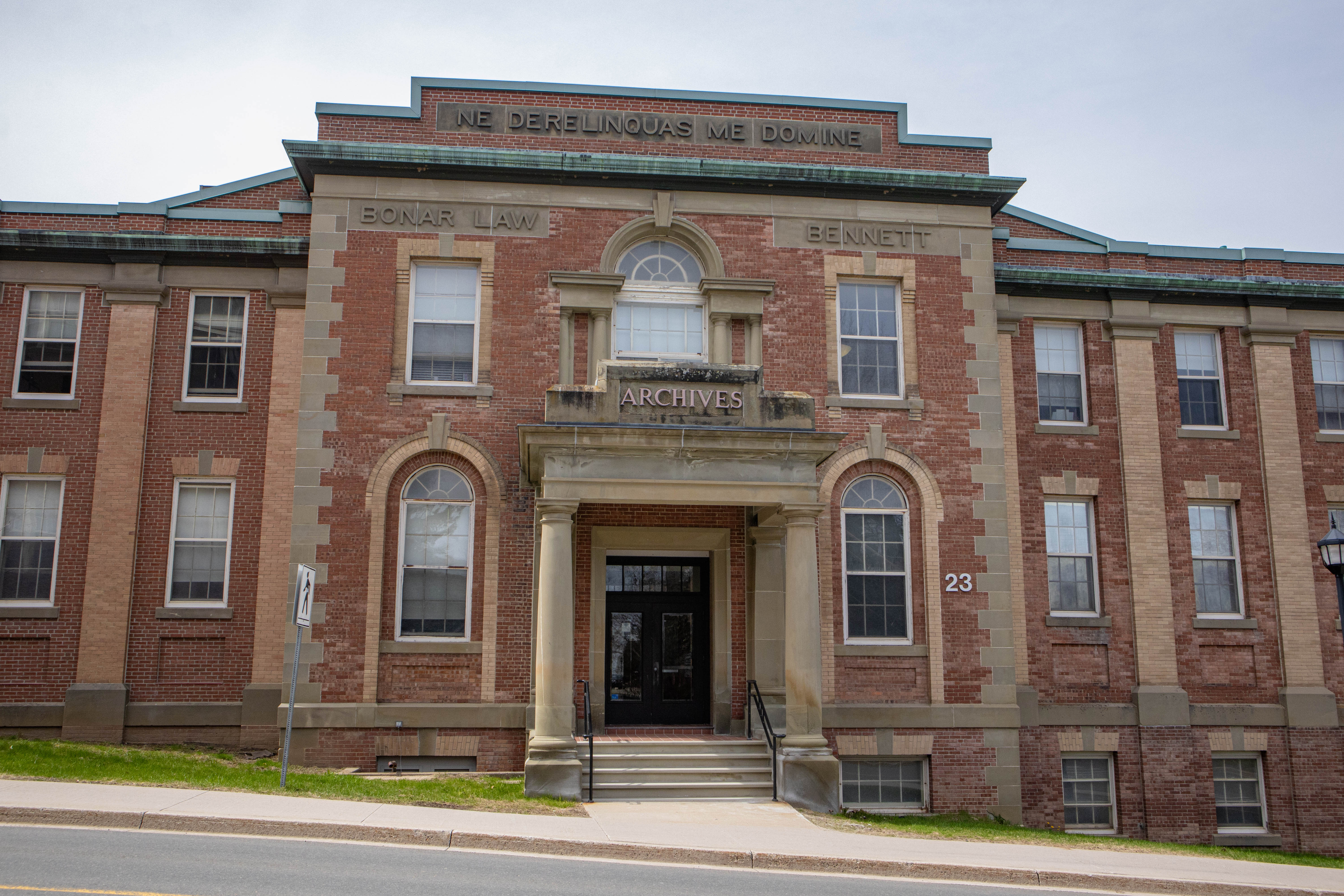
- Bonar Law-Bennett Building, where the Provincial Archives of New Brunswick is located
- Established: 1967
- Location: Bonar Law-Bennett Building, University of New Brunswick campus, Fredericton, New Brunswick
- Coordinates: 45.9489°N 66.6433°W
- Type: Archives
- Senior Provincial Archivist: Joanna Aiton Kerr
- Website: archives.gnb.ca

Provincial Archives of New Brunswick (PANB) is the archives agency for the Canadian province of New Brunswick. It is located on the campus of the University of New Brunswick in Fredericton, New Brunswick, Canada.

PANB was established in 1967 and operates under the Archives Act.
