= Blakeney (surname) =

Blakeney is a surname. Notable people with the surname include:

- Allan Blakeney (1925–2011), Canadian politician
- Antonio Blakeney (born 1996), American basketball player in the Israeli Basketball Premier League
- Ben Bruce Blakeney (1908–1963), American lawyer
- Edward Blakeney (1778–1868), British field marshal
- Frederick Blakeney (1913–1990), Australian diplomat
- Issac Blakeney (born 1992), American football player
- John Blakeney (disambiguation)
- Justina Blakeney (born 1979), American writer
- Martha Elizabeth Blakeney (1897–1969), American political hostess
- Michael Blakeney, British and Australian academic
- Olive Blakeney (1899–1959), American actress
- R. B. D. Blakeney (1872–1952), British Army captain and fascist politician
- Robert Blakeney (died 1733), Irish MP for Athenry
- Robert Blakeney (died 1762), Irish MP for Athenry
- Theophilus Blakeney, Irish MP for Athenry, soldier, and High Sheriff of County Galway
- William Blakeney, 1st Baron Blakeney (1672–1761), Irish British Army lieutenant-general and politician
- William Theophilus Blakeney (1832–1898), Registrar-General for Queensland
- William Blakeney (died 1804), Irish MP for Athenry
