= List of Irish MPs 1776–1783 =

This is a list of members of the Irish House of Commons between 1776 and 1783. There were 300 MPs at a time in this period.

Name	Constituency	Notes
Archibald Acheson		
George Agar		
James Agar		
Mervyn Archdall	County Fermanagh	
Benjamin Stratford		
Edward Stratford		
John Stratford		
Richard Annesley	Coleraine	
William Eden	Dungannon	Chief Secretary for Ireland, 1780–1782
Beauchamp Bagenal		
Francis Bernard		
Armar Lowry		
John Beresford		
James Bernard		
Sir John Blackwood		
Robert Blackwood		
John Blakeney		
John Blakeney		
Theophilus Blakeney		
William Blakeney		
John Blaquiere		Chief Secretary for Ireland, 1772–1776
Samuel Bradstreet		
Sir Arthur Brooke	County Fermanagh	
Henry Vaughan Brooke		
James Alexander		
Hugh Carleton		
Hugh Carleton		
Edward Cary	County Londonderry (1761-)	Privy Council of Ireland, 1770-1797
Sir Henry Cavendish		
William Trench		
John FitzGibbon		
Nathaniel Clements		
William Conyngham		
Charles Coote		
Isaac Corry		
Sir Edward Crofton		
John Crosbie		
Denis Daly		
Denis Bowes Daly	Galway Town	
Jocelyn Deane		
John Talbot Dillon		
Richard Hely		
Henry Prittie		
Riggs Falkiner		
Barry Maxwell		
John Maxwell		
Charles FitzGerald		
Lord Henry FitzGerald		
Robert FitzGerald		
Richard FitzPatrick	Maryborough	Chief Secretary for Ireland, 1782
Sir Frederick Flood		
Henry Flood	Enniskillen	
Thomas Fortescue		
John Foster	Navan	
John Thomas Foster		
Luke Gardiner		
John Prendergast Smyth		
Henry Grattan	Charlemont	
Sackville Hamilton		
John Handcock		
William Handcock		
Arthur Pomeroy		
Henry Pomeroy		
Maurice Mahon		
Francis Rawdon		
Thomas Taylour		
Robert Hellen		
John Hely		
John Hely		
Sir Richard Heron	Lisburn	Chief Secretary for Ireland, 1776–1780
Peter Holmes		
Robert Jephson		
Robert Jocelyn		
John Browne		
Arthur Hill		
Hercules Langrishe		
Robert Clements		
Charles Loftus		
Robert Stewart		
Richard Longfield		
Richard Martin		
Hugh Massy		
Sir Capel Molyneux		
Alexander Montgomery		
Alexander Montgomery		
George Montgomery		
Nathaniel Montgomery		
Henry Sandford		
Edmund Butler		
Robert Deane		
Sir Edward Newenham	County Dublin	
John Toler		
Thomas Knox		
Sir Lucius O'Brien		
George Ogle		
John Butler		
Sir William Osborne		
Sir William Parsons		
Edmund Pery		
John Pomeroy		
George Ponsonby		
John Ponsonby		
William Ponsonby		
Thomas Knox		
Boyle Roche		
Laurence Parsons		
Robert Cuninghame		
John Scott		
Lord Henry Seymour		
Thomas Smyth		
Robert Henry Southwell		
John Staples		
Hercules Taylour		
Philip Tisdall		
Charles Tottenham		
Charles Tottenham		
Richard Boyle Townsend		
Richard Townsend		
James Cuffe		
John Vaughan		
Edward Ward		
Robert Ward		
Richard Wellesley		
George Nugent		
John Browne		
Owen Wynne		
Barry Yelverton		
