= John Blakeney =

John Blakeney may refer to:

- John Blakeney (priest) (1824–1895), Anglican priest
- John Blakeney (died 1747) (c. 1703–1747), Irish Member of Parliament
- John Blakeney (died 1781) (1756–1781), Irish Member of Parliament
- John Blakeney (died 1789) (c. 1729–1789), Irish soldier and politician
- John Blakeney (Irish judge) (died 1438), Irish Chief Justice
