= Robert Blakeney =

Robert Blakeney may refer to:

- Robert Blakeney (died 1762) (c.1724–1762), Irish politician
- Robert Blakeney (died 1733) (1679–1733), Irish politician
- R. B. D. Blakeney (1872–1952), British Army officer and fascist politician
