= General Blakeney (disambiguation) =

William Blakeney, 1st Baron Blakeney (1672–1761) was a British Army lieutenant general. General Blakeney may also refer to:

- Edward Blakeney (1778–1868), British Army general
- R. B. D. Blakeney (1872–1952), British Army brigadier general
