= Stratford Eyre =

Anglo-Irish soldier and official

Stratford Eyre (fl. 1731–1755) was an Anglo-Irish soldier and governor of Galway.

== Background and origin ==
Eyre was a descendant of John Eyre, who had settled in County Galway in the 1650s and established a dynasty under the Protestant Ascendancy. Stratford was the son of Samuel Eyre (Governor of Galway in 1715) and Anne née Stratford.

He was appointed High Sheriff of County Galway for 1731. He served as a Colonel at Battle of Culloden in 1746.

== Governor of Galway ==
He was appointed Governor of the town in 1747. Froude described the then state of the town:

He found himself set to defend a town of which the walls had not been repaired for a quarter of a century; the castle in ruins; the very name of military authority forgotten. By law no Catholics ought to have been in Galway at all. There were thirty Catholics there to one Protestant, and the Protestant was becoming Protestant but in name. There were 180 ecclesiastics, Jesuits friars, and seculars. Robert Martin, owner of half Connemara, resided within the liberties, and was making a fortune by smuggling there. He was described by Eyre as 'able to bring to the town of Galway in twenty four hours 800 villains as desperate and as absolutely at his devotion as Cameron of Lochiel'. The Mayor and Corporation, the fee-simple of whose property did not amount to 1000 received the tolls and customs duties. By their charter they were bound in return to maintain the fortifications. Being what they were, they preferred to divide the town revenue amongst themselves. The mayor, an O'Hara, was the son of Lord Tyrawley's footman; the sheriff was a beggar; of the aldermen one was a poor shoemaker, the other a broken dragoon.

Eyre re-established discipline in the garrison, closed the gaps in the town walls and ordered the gate closed at sunset. Unused to such high-handedness, the Corporation sent a furious letter of complaint to Government, signed by the members a majority of the citizens. In response to this, Governor Eyre sent for the members and said to them:

Gentlemen since you are here in your corporate capacity, I must recommend you to disperse these restless Popish ecclesiastics. Let me not meet them in every corner of the streets when I walk as I have done. No sham searches, Mr. Sheriff, as to my knowledge you lately made. Your birds were flown, but they left you cakes and wine to entertain yourselves withal. I shall send you, Mr. Mayor a list of some insolent unregistered priests, who absolutely refused me to quarter my soldiers, and to my surprise you have billeted none on them. These and James Fitzgerald, who is also an unregistered priest, and had the insolence to solicit votes for his brother upon a prospect of a vacancy in Parliament, I expect you'll please to tender the oaths to, and proceed against on the Galway and Limerick Act. Let us unite together in keeping those turbulent disqualified townsmen in a due subjection. Lastly, gentlemen, I put you in mind of the condition on which tolls and customs are granted to you. Repair the breaches in these walls and repair your streets.

== Opposition ==
Eyre's policy was supported by the government, but opposed by the Corporation of Galway, the Prime Sergeant, the Protestant Bishop of Elphin, and Francis II de Bermingham, Lord Athenry. He was threatened with assassination as would appear from the following anonymous letter which he enclosed with his correspondence to Secretary Wayte, 11 December 1747:-

Sir, as I had not the pleasure of seeing you since you came to your government of Galway, I hope soon to see you in the Elysian fields, as I am just going off the stage. And I am sure, if you don't leave that town, you'll lose your life before the 10th of next month. 'Tis all your own fault, for you could not bear the employment which you got, not for your bravery, but for the slaughter you committed on poor people after Culloden fight. You'll be served as Lord Lovat's agent was. God be merciful to your soul.

Much of the dissent centred on Robert Martin of Dangan, the leader of the Connacht Jacobites and a leading Freemason. Thady Brennan, Martin's servant, walked past the sentinel at the bridge carrying a gun and pistol, apparently for repair. The boy being a Catholic was disarmed, but Eyre returned the weapons to Martin with a message that if he was sending arms into the town he had better in future send them by persons qualified to carry such things.

On Martin refusing to receive back his property, Eyre confiscated the weapons. The assizes coming on Martin served a summons on Eyre to appear before the judges and answer to a charge of larceny. Enclosing the following document to Secretary Wayte, Eyre wrote, "If the law was to be thus openly insulted, government would become impossible and neither the Property Act nor any other act, could be enforced in any part of Ireland."

Eyre travelled to London on business, where he was followed and struck by Robert Martin. The two engaged in a lengthy sword-duel, with Martin emerging the winner. The two would remain antagonists, as Martin continued to recruit for Jacobite regiments in France, and is believed to have harboured Bonnie Prince Charlie on an incognito visit to Ireland in 1753.

Froude described Eyre as "a man full of violent personal and religious animosities, intolerant of opposition, and much more fit of the command of a regiment than for the difficult task of governing a Catholic town." His descendants continued to live in the county into the late 19th century.

== Note ==
Robert Martin of Dangan was the father of Colonel Richard Martin (1754–1834), Irish M.P. and animal rights activist, grandfather of Thomas Barnwall Martin M.P. (1784–1847), and great-grandfather of the novelist, Mary Letitia Martin, (1815–1850).

== External references ==
- http://places.galwaylibrary.ie/history/chapter56.html
