= Robert Blakeney (died 1733) =

Irish politician (1679–1733)

Robert Blakeney (1679 – 1 May 1733) was an Irish Member of Parliament.

He was the son of John Blakeney of Gallogh. William Blakeney, 1st Baron Blakeney was a second cousin.

He was appointed High Sheriff of County Galway for 1709 and 1729. He represented Athenry in the Irish House of Commons from 1721 to his death.

He married Sarah, the daughter of Gilbert Ormsby, M.P. and had 3 sons and 4 daughters. His son John Blakeney and grandsons Robert, John, Theophilus and William Blakeney were also MPs for Athenry.
