= Eyrecourt Castle =

17th-century country house in Galway, Ireland

- Location of the former castle in Ireland
- Alternative names: Eyre Court

General information
- Status: Ruinous state
- Type: Country house
- Location: near Eyrecourt, Galway, Ireland
- Coordinates: 53°12′06″N 8°07′22″W
- Named for: John Eyre
- Estimated completion: c. 1660s – c. 1670s
- Destroyed: c. 1920s (abandoned)
- Client: Colonel John Eyre
- Owner: Eyre family

Technical details
- Floor count: 2
- Grounds: 800 acres (320 ha) (1662)

Eyrecourt Castle (or Eyre Court) was an Irish 17th-century country house in Galway which became a ruin in the 20th century. The house, the surrounding estate, and the nearby small town of Eyrecourt all took their name from Colonel the Right Hon. John Eyre, an Englishman who was granted a large parcel of land in recognition of his part in the military campaign in Galway during the Cromwellian conquest of Ireland. There was an earlier fortified house or castle on the same land.

== Description ==
Eyrecourt Castle was "an early example [of] a classical country house ". A seven-bay two-storey house "built on a symmetrical pattern with a central staircase and hall taking up nearly a third of the overall space, it was an impressive, modern residence for the new landowner". Mary Granville, a visitor to the castle, commented in 1731 on a "great many fine woods and improvements that looked very English" in the parkland around the house. Richard Cumberland, a few decades later, called it "a spacious mansion, not in the best repair" with "a vast extent of soil, not very productive". The grounds are now called a demesne, a standard expression in Ireland for an estate; the demesne gates were bought and restored by the National Heritage Council in the 1990s.

The most striking features of the house were its "ambitious wood-carvings, massive doorcases and a famous baroque staircase", one of the first grand staircases in Ireland, with "acanthus leaves issuing from grotesque masks and rolling down the banisters" and "by far the most exuberant piece of wood carving surviving from the 17th century". Dutch craftsmen are believed to have worked there, with the possible involvement of the Dublin-based French-born James Tabary. One chimneypiece followed a design of Serlio's.

The house had a motto over the door to the main hall saying, "Welcome to the house of liberty", and its own small chapel, built in 1677. Local tradition says the grounds were used as an overnight camp by Ginkell's Williamite army after the Battle of Aughrim in 1691.

== History ==
In 1662 Colonel John Eyre was granted the 800 acres (320 ha) of Eyrecourt land, with the power to empark it, as reward for his role in Cromwell's Irish campaign. He built the house in the 1660s or early 1670s. Eyre was subsequently an MP for County Galway and High Sheriff of County Galway for 1681. On his death in 1685 the property passed to his eldest son John (known as Proud Eyre). From him it passed in turn to John's son George (High Sheriff in 1706 but who died young in 1710), then to George's brother, John (High Sheriff in 1724) and then to a third brother, the Revd. Giles, Dean of Killaloe and Clonfert. From Giles it passed to Giles' son John, who was made Baron Eyre. Lord Eyre died childless in 1781 and the peerage became extinct.

The house, however, was inherited by his nephew Lieutenant-Colonel Giles Eyre (High Sheriff in 1798), who spent a lot of money on unsuccessful electioneering. He left it to his own eldest son, John (1794–1856). John was killed while hunting and it passed to his son, yet another John (1820–1890). On the latter's death in 1890 it descended to William Henry Gregory Eyre, an Assistant Land Commissioner.

In 1883 the Eyres were considered insolvent and by the time William Henry Gregory Eyre died in 1925, the estate had diminished and a house fire had destroyed much of the castle. William Randolph Hearst bought the ornately carved staircase of Eyrecourt Castle in 1927 and had it shipped to the United States. Subsequent to the death of Hearst his estate donated the Eyrecourt staircase to the Detroit Institute of Arts.

== See also ==
- Plantations of Ireland
- Edmund Ludlow
- Miyazaki House
