= John Blakeney (died 1789) =

Irish soldier and official

John Blakeney (c. 1729 – 25 July 1789) was an Irish soldier.

He was son of John Blakeney and Grace Perrse, grandson of Robert Blakeney, brother of Robert Blakeney, Theophilus Blakeney and William Blakeney, and uncle of John Blakeney and Edward Blakeney.

As a soldier John Blakeney fought in the Battle of Culloden, the Battle of Matinico and the siege of Havana and reached the rank of Colonel.

He represented Athenry in the Irish House of Commons from 1763 to his death. He was High Sheriff of County Galway for 1768.

He died unmarried.
