= Masajiro Miyazaki =

Japanese-Canadian osteopathic physician

- Education: Doctor of Osteopathic Medicine
- Alma mater: University of British Columbia, Kirksville College of Osteopathy and Surgery
- Occupations: Physician, coroner

Masajiro Miyazaki, CM (November 24, 1899 – July 23, 1984) was a Canadian osteopathic physician who practised in Vancouver prior to World War II. During World War II, he was appointed as a coroner by the British Columbia Provincial Police in the town of Lillooet, British Columbia. In addition to coroner's duties he also served as effective general practitioner in the Lillooet area, including for the area's four wartime "self-supporting centres". Miyazaki's practice also included the Japanese Canadian internment camp at Taylor Lake. Towards the end of his life, Miyazaki was recognized for his services to the community, which included founding the local ambulance service and instigating a proper hospital for Lillooet, by being enrolled in the Order of Canada.

== Early life ==
Miyazaki was born in the vicinity of Hikone City in Japan and moved to Canada in 1913 with his father. Graduating from the University of British Columbia in 1925, he was unable to pursue medical training in Canada due to laws preventing post-secondary study by Japanese Canadians and pursued study in the United States, at the Kirksville College of Osteopathy and Surgery in Missouri, graduating in 1929. Dr. Miyazaki received his licence to practise from the College of Physicians and Surgeons of British Columbia but pursued further training in Los Angeles, ultimately opening an office in Vancouver in 1930. During his time in Vancouver he was active in Japanese Canadian community affairs, and served as treasurer of the Canadian Japanese Association from 1938 to 1941.

== World War II ==
=== Japanese relocation ===
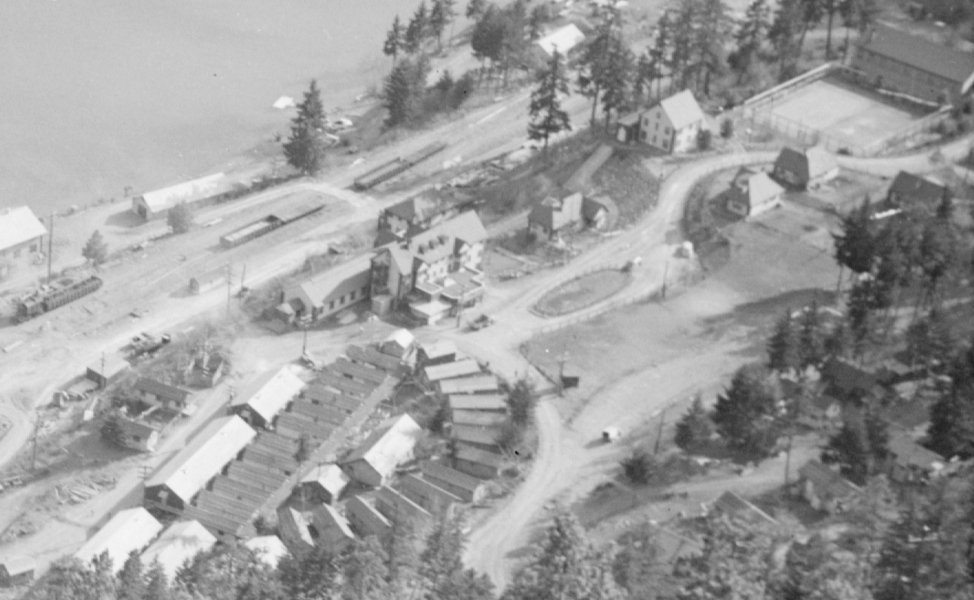
Bridge River hydroelectric townsite at South Shalalth - Closeup of hotel and residential area, 1940s. During wartime, the houses were occupied by relocated families, single men and some families. were housed in the semicircle of smaller buildings were barracks originally built for hydroelectric construction

Following the attack on Pearl Harbor by the Japanese Empire on December 7, 1941, wartime paranoia led to the forced evacuation of Japanese and Canadians of Japanese ancestry away from the British Columbia coast to the province's interior and beyond to other provinces farther east. One of the sites chosen for these relocations was a semi-abandoned hydroelectric-development village at Shalalth (then known as Bridge River), one of them at East Lillooet in the Fraser Canyon, across the Fraser River from the town of Lillooet; Miyazaki was first relocated to Bridge River and then upon his appointment as coroner was moved to the town of Lillooet. Other sites in the area were at Minto City, McGillivray Falls. These were not fenced internment camps, like the infamous one at Tashme, and mostly included family groups who had been able to "buy" a better situation in the Interior, with some chance of work, although comings-and-goings were still regulated by police and permits. Many of the Japanese at the "Bridge River" townsite worked for the Pacific Great Eastern Railway and the cartage companies, while those at McGillivray Falls relocated to nearby Devine to work in a sawmill. At Lillooet, the presence of the Japanese helped keep the wartime merchant economy going, and the Japanese interest in market gardening helped rebirth the valley's small produce industry.

=== Career in Lillooet ===
One of the relocatees at Bridge River was Masajiro Miyazaki, a Canadian-trained osteopath whose practice had been thriving in Vancouver before the war. When the town of Lillooet's doctor died and a wartime replacement was not to be had to perform autopsies, the town's provincial costabulary recruited Miyazaki to act in the capacity of coroner.

Special permits were created to allow him to stay in Lillooet instead of at Bridge River. This position quickly evolved into that of all-around town-and-country doctor, dentist and obstetrician, with patients throughout the whole region from Pemberton-Mount Currie to Pavilion and Lytton.

Miyazaki's practice also included the Japanese-Canadian internment camp at Taylor Lake, northeast of 70 Mile House, a long distance away via the tortuous roads of the Fraser Canyon and the Thompson Canyon. His autobiography, My Sixty Years In Canada, contains many accounts of harrowing trips on mountain roads and rail lines in difficult weather and adverse conditions.

=== Miyazaki House ===
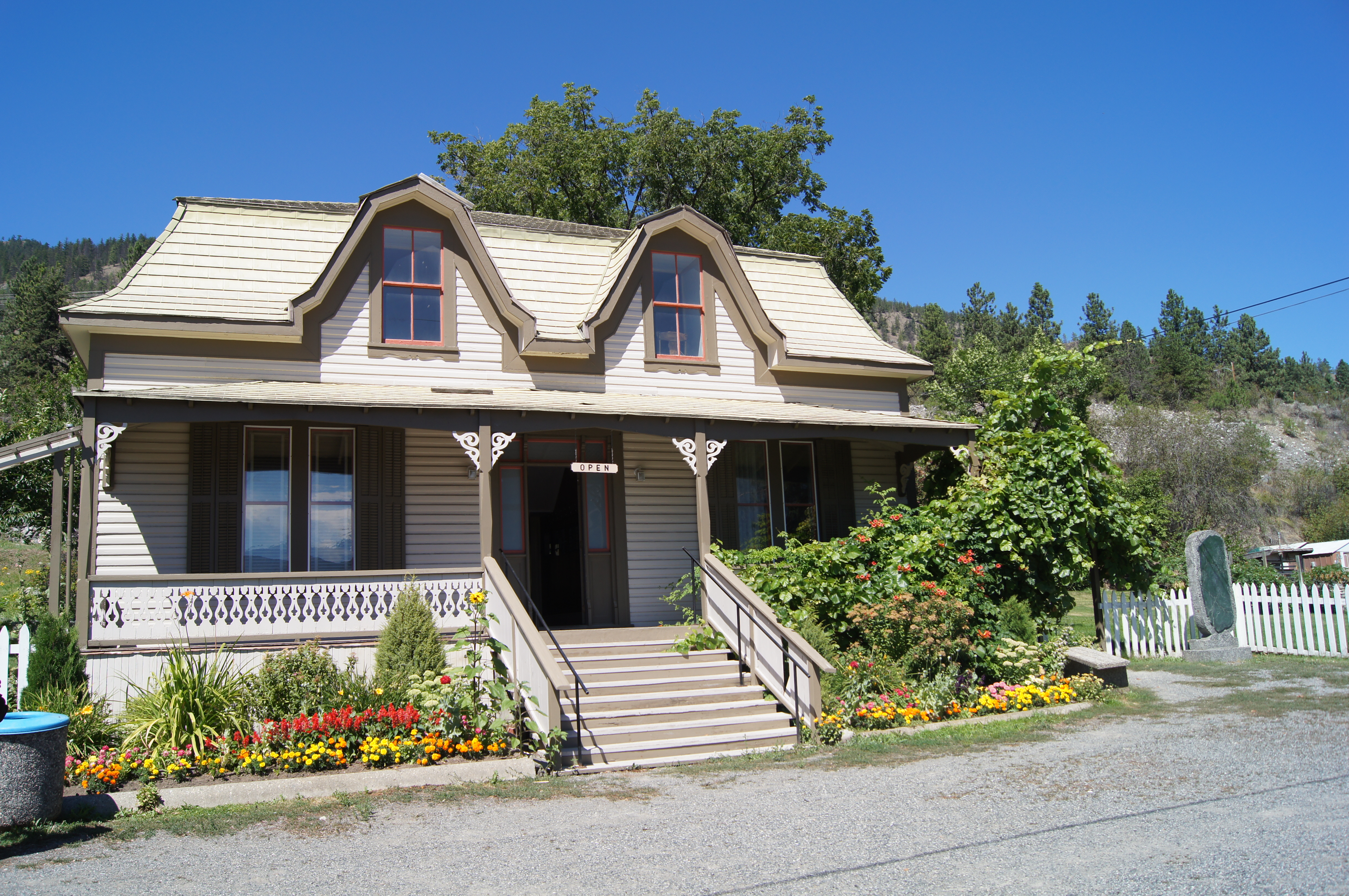
The Miyazaki House in Lillooet, British Columbia, which now serves as a museum.

Miyazaki was invited to use as his surgery and residence Longford House, a late 19th-century manor near the main street owned by one of the town's oldest families (see Caspar Phair). Like many of the relocated Japanese in this district, Miyazaki stayed on after the war and became a major community leader during the 1950s, leading the campaign for a local ambulance service and proper hospital — despite longstanding resistance from the provincial medical establishment over his qualifications, as he was only an osteopath and not a medical doctor.

In 1983, after Miyazaki donated the property to the community when he left Lillooet that year, Longford House was renamed Miyazaki House. The house remains open as a heritage site for tours and still exhibits Miyazaki's office as he left it. His office still contains all original articles, including surgical instruments, medical texts, and skeletal displays. The house also has displays of local artwork and the history of the house before Miyazaki moved there.

== Order of Canada ==
Towards the end of his life, Miyazaki was recognized for his services to the community by being enrolled in the Order of Canada, an honour shared by one of Lillooet's other notable citizens, Kansas-born Margaret "Ma" Murray.

His Order of Canada commendation reads:

C.M. (Member) December 15, 1976 April 20, 1977

Retired osteopath who, over a period of 35 years, has given unselfish service to the residents of Lillooet, British Columbia, particularly those of Japanese and Indian backgrounds and who continues to serve his community in spite of ill health.

Miyazaki died of an infection in Kamloops, British Columbia on July 23, 1984.

== See also ==
- Japanese Canadian internment

=== Archives ===
There is a Masajiro Miyazaki fonds at Library and Archives Canada. The archival reference number is R3948.
