= Caspar Phair =

- Born: Unknown; Ireland
- Died: 1933; Lillooet, British Columbia, Canada
- Occupations: Government Agent, Magistrate, Chief Constable, Coroner, Fire Chief, Game Warden, Merchant
- Known for: Early settler of Lillooet, founding family general store, Longford House
- Spouse: Cerise Eyre
- Children: A.W.A. (Artie) Phair

Caspar Phair (died 1933) was one of the early settlers of Lillooet, British Columbia, Canada, arriving about 1877 to take up the role of the village's school teacher. He emigrated from Ireland. Caspar Phair became Lillooet's Government Agent, a position which at one time encompassed a wide-ranging assemblage of duties. In time he assumed the roles of magistrate, chief constable, coroner, fire chief, and game warden. His lasting mark was made in business as a merchant-launching the family's general store on a 'run' that would extend over 50 years.

In 1879 he married Cerise Eyre, daughter of Maria Josephine Martley by a previous marriage. Cerise Armit Eyre and her sister Mary Eyre had remained in England with their grandparent's when the Martley's travelled to the new colony of British Columbia in 1861. Maria's daughter's by Eyre joined the family in 1871. The wedding took place on The Grange, the Martley ranching property near Pavilion. Cerise's sister Mary would marry Henry Cornwall of Ashcroft Ranch.

In the 1890s the Phairs had a residence that they named Longford House, built in Lillooet. This elegant building is said to be partially modeled on and named after Mrs Phair's home in Eyrecourt, of County Galway in Ireland. Longford survives to this day as the village's only significant example of heritage-quality domestic architecture.

Caspar Phair's son, A.W.A. (Artie) Phair, was a coroner as well as a noted chronicler and photographer of Lillooet's history.

Caspar and Cerise Phair died in 1933, leaving their house to Harold Phair, Artie's son. Longford House was later bought by Dr. Masajiro Miyazaki and is now called the Miyazaki House.

== See also ==
- Gold Commissioner
- Cayoosh Gold Rush
