= Miyazaki House =

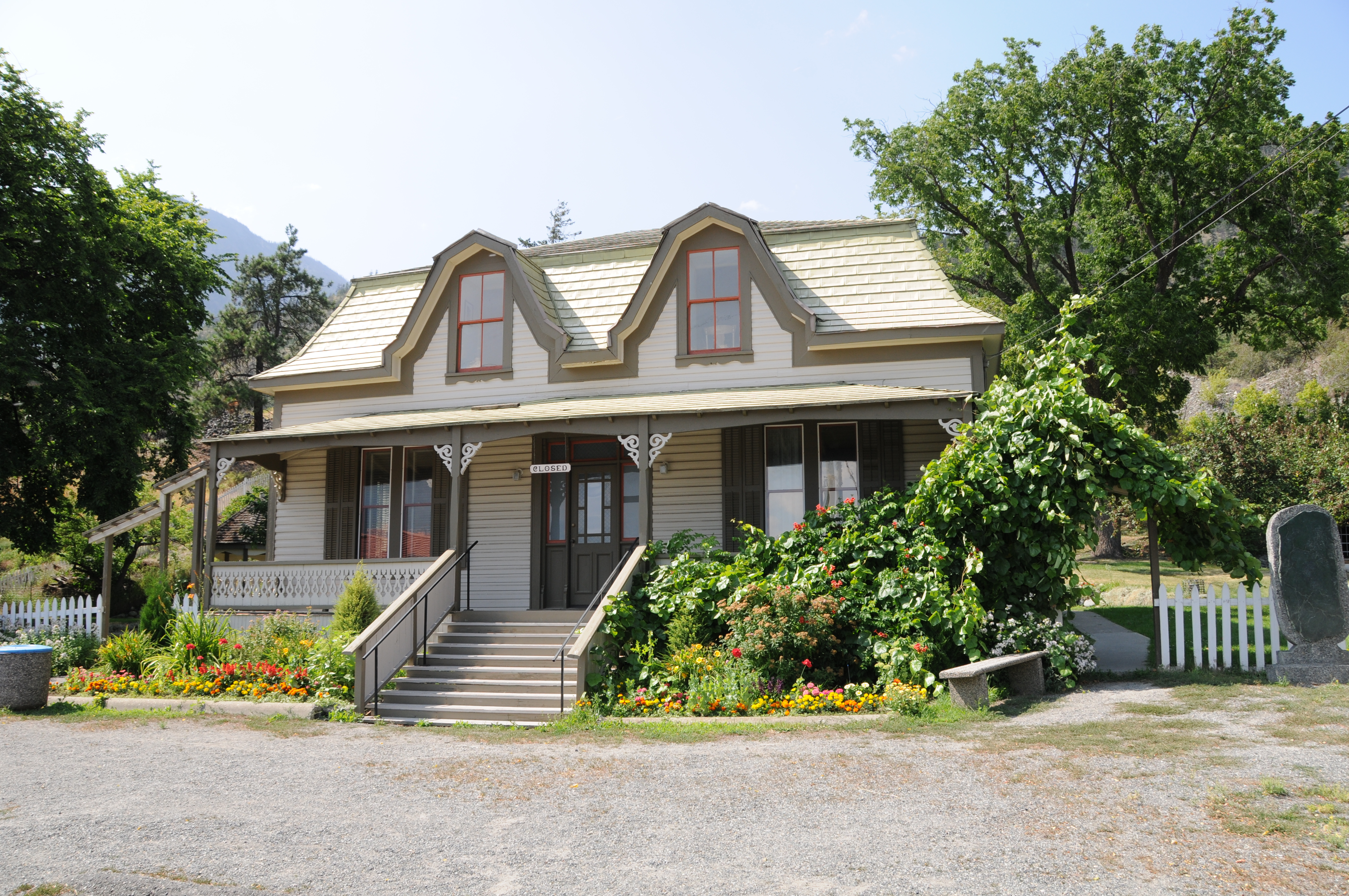
- Interactive map of Miyazaki House
- 50°41′37.7″N 121°56′05.6″W
- Location: Lillooet, British Columbia, Canada

History
- Built: 1880s

Site notes
- Website: miyazakihouse.com

National Historic Site of Canada

The Miyazaki House (formerly the Longford House) in Lillooet, British Columbia is an elegant house built by Caspar Phair in the 1880s. It was partially modelled after Mrs. Phair's previous home, Eyrecourt Castle, in County Galway, Ireland. The gardens originally reached down to Lillooet's Main Street. A.W.A. "Artie" Phair was next to live in the house, though he let the gardens deteriorate. In collaboration with the head of the local British Columbia Provincial Police, Phair brought Dr. Masajiro Miyazaki from the Bridge River relocation camp in Shalalth to Lillooet to replace the local coroner in 1945, and Miyazaki served in that capacity and, although only an osteopath by credentials, served in the capacity of doctor and dentist, and was living in Longford House in 1945. Dr. Miyazaki bought the house legally from Artie's son, Harold Phair, in 1947, when the ban on Japanese Canadians buying and owning property was lifted. The house was then used as Dr. Miyazaki's office until he donated it to the community of Lillooet in 1983.

The house is now called the Miyazaki House and is used for community events and local artwork display. It is also open as a Heritage House Tuesday to Saturday, 10–4, for free tours.
