= William Blakeney, 1st Baron Blakeney =

Anglo-Irish army officer and politician (1672–1761

Lieutenant-General The Right Honourable The Lord Blakeney KB
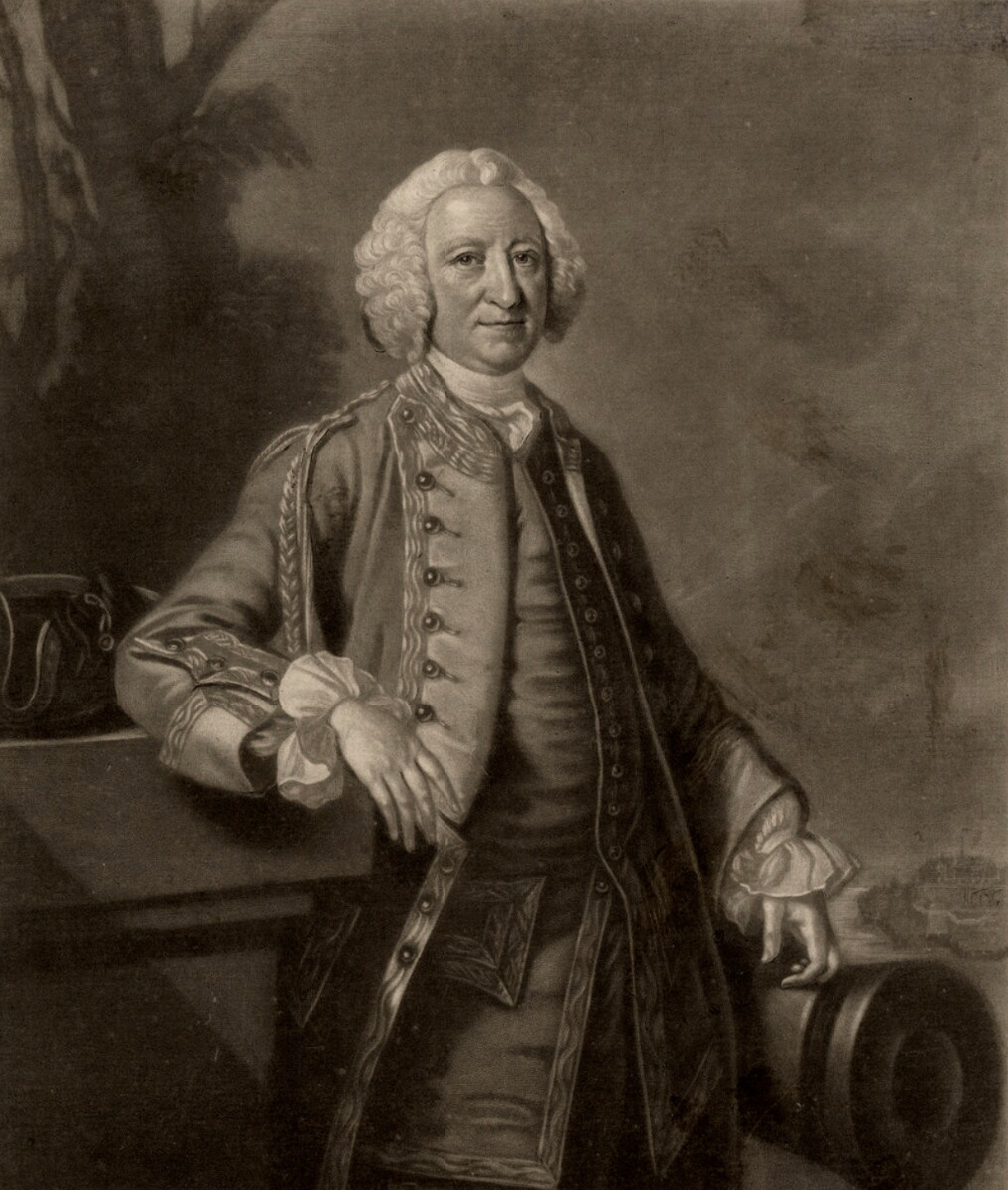
- 1756 mezzotint

Lieutenant governor of Menorca
- In office 1748–1757

Governor of Stirling Castle
- In office 1742–1748

Member of Parliament for Kilmallock (Parliament of Ireland constituency)
- In office 1725–1757

Personal details
- Born: 7 September 1672 Mount Blakeney, County Limerick
- Died: 20 September 1761 (aged 89) Mount Blakeney, County Limerick
- Resting place: Westminster Abbey, London
- Relations: Robert Blakeney (1679-1733)
- Parent(s): William (1640–1718); Elizabeth (1652–1710)

Military service
- Allegiance: England; Great Britain
- Branch/service: English Army; British Army
- Years of service: 1695–1756
- Rank: Lieutenant-general
- Unit: Royal Regiment of Foot; 1st Foot Guards
- Commands: 31st Foot; 27th Foot
- Battles/wars: Nine Years War; Siege of Namur (1695); War of the Spanish Succession; Battle of Schellenberg; Battle of Blenheim; Battle of Malplaquet; War of Jenkins' Ear; Battle of Cartagena de Indias; Invasion of Cuba (1741); Jacobite rising of 1745; Siege of Stirling Castle (1746); Seven Years' War; Siege of Fort St Philip (1756)

Lieutenant-General William Blakeney, 1st Baron Blakeney (7 September 1672 – 20 September 1761) was an Anglo-Irish army officer and politician who served in the English and British armies from 1695 to 1756. He also represented Kimallock in the Irish House of Commons from 1725 to 1757, although Blakeney was rarely present as an MP.

A tough, reliable and courageous officer, Blakeney was also known for his innovative approach to weapons drill and training. His defence of Stirling Castle during the Jacobite rising of 1745 was rewarded with an appointment as lieutenant governor of Menorca in 1748. When the Seven Years' War began in April 1756, the French sent an expeditionary force which occupied most of the island, although Blakeney and the garrison of Fort St. Philip held out for 70 days. Admiral of the Blue John Byng was later court-martialled and executed for failing to relieve him, but Blakeney was made a baron in recognition of his resolute defence.

Now over 80 years old, this ended Blakeney's military career, and he retired to his home in County Limerick, dying there in September 1761. He was buried in Westminster Abbey. He never married, and his peerage became extinct on his death.

== Personal details ==
William Blakeney was born on 7 September 1672, eldest child of William and Elizabeth Blakeney. His siblings included Robert (died 1763), Charles (1674–1741), John (1696–1720), Mary (born c. 1678), Catherine (born 1680) and Elizabeth (died 1740).

William Blakeney owned estates at Castleblakeney, in County Galway, and Mount Blakeney, in County Limerick. The family supplied the MP for Athenry and High Sheriff of County Galway for over a century. Blakeney inherited his father's property, but reputedly lived on his military pay and allowed his brothers use of the family estate. He never married, and on his death in 1761, the property passed to Major Robert Blakeney, his younger brother.

== Career ==
=== 1695 to 1739 ===
During the 1689 to 1691 Williamite War in Ireland, Blakeney remained at Mount Blakeney to defend his estates against raids by Jacobite rapparees, while the rest of his family relocated to Castleblakeney. In 1692, he joined his uncle George Blakeney in Flanders; serving as a volunteer, he was wounded at the siege of Namur on 31 August 1695 during the attack on the Terra Nova earthwork which allegedly inspired the song "The British Grenadiers". In September 1695, he was commissioned as an ensign into the English Army's Royal Regiment of Foot, and was subsequently placed on half-pay after the 1697 Treaty of Ryswick.

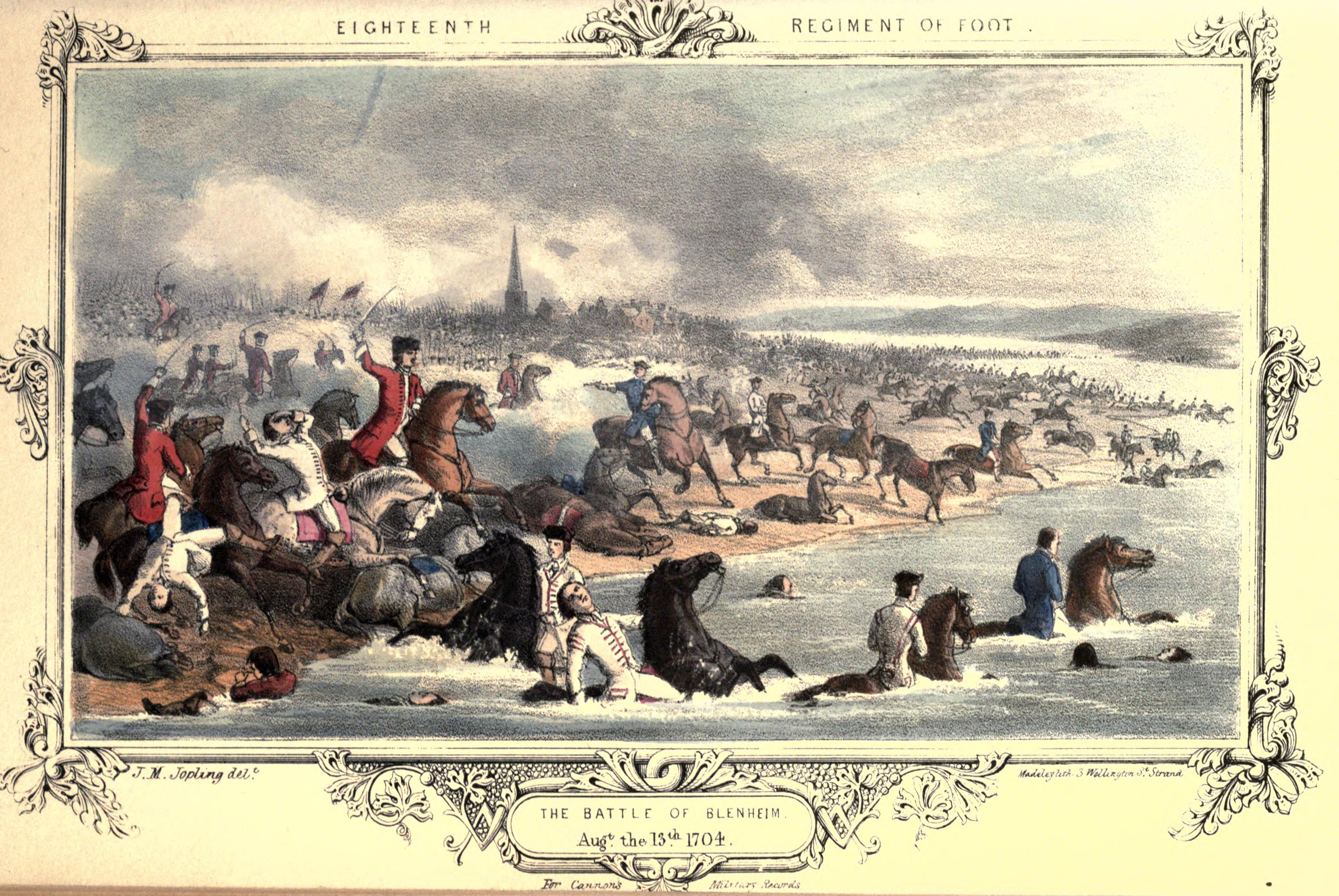
Blenheim, 1704; Blakeney's regiment (left foreground) pursue the French as they retreat into the Danube

When the War of the Spanish Succession began in 1701, he was reactivated and fought at the battles of Schellenberg, Blenheim and Ramillies. He was promoted to captain in April 1707. In March 1708, he was commissioned as a lieutenant in the 1st Regiment of Foot Guards, although only 16 of its nominal 24 companies were actually formed, and Blakeney remained with his original unit.

Under the practice known as double-ranking, Guards officers held a second, higher army rank; for example, a Guards lieutenant ranked as an army major. In addition, such units were rarely disbanded and their officers given precedence when deciding promotions, making it a cheap way to reward competent but poor officers. John Huske, one of Blakeney's colleagues during the Jacobite rising of 1745, was commissioned in the Guards for similar reasons.

Blakeney's regiment escaped disbandment after the 1713 Peace of Utrecht; when his uncle retired from the Lord John Kerr's Regiment of Foot (ranked as the 31st Regiment of Foot) in 1718, he assigned his commission as lieutenant colonel of the regiment to his nephew. Blakeney retained this position for the next 20 years; some biographers suggest he was deliberately held back, but promotion in this period was slow for all officers. He became colonel of the 27th Foot in 1737, with the support of the Duke of Richmond.

=== 1740 to 1748 ===
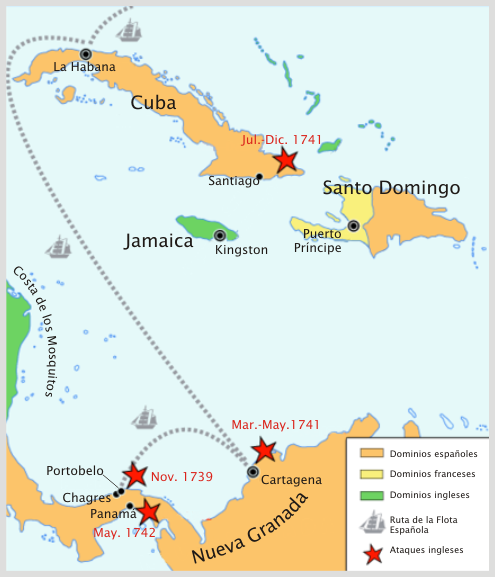
War of Jenkins' Ear; British operations in the Caribbean, 1740-1742

When trade disputes with Spain led to the outbreak of the War of Jenkins' Ear in 1739, Blakeney was appointed brigadier general in the expeditionary force sent to reinforce Admiral Edward Vernon. His reputation for training was a factor in his selection, since the force included 3,000 newly recruited provincial troops from British America. He took part in the disastrous attack of March 1741 on Cartagena de Indias and the short-lived invasion of Cuba. The West Indies was a notoriously unhealthy posting, and simply surviving was an achievement. Between 1740 and 1742, British military deaths from disease and combat were estimated as over 20,000, with death rates of 80–90% among soldiers.

With little to show for the investment of men and money, the survivors returned to Britain in October 1742. Blakeney was appointed lieutenant governor of Stirling Castle, an immensely strong position controlling access between the Scottish Highlands and the Lowlands. In September 1745, the Jacobite Army passed the castle en route to Edinburgh, but lacked the equipment needed to take it.

The Jacobites made a more serious attempt in the siege of Stirling Castle in January 1746, but progress was slow. Despite victory at Falkirk Muir on 1 February, the Jacobites lifted the siege and withdrew to Inverness when a government army under Prince William, Duke of Cumberland began advancing north from Edinburgh. After the Rising ended at Culloden in April 1746, Blakeney was promoted lieutenant general and given military command of the Highlands.

=== 1748 to 1761 ===
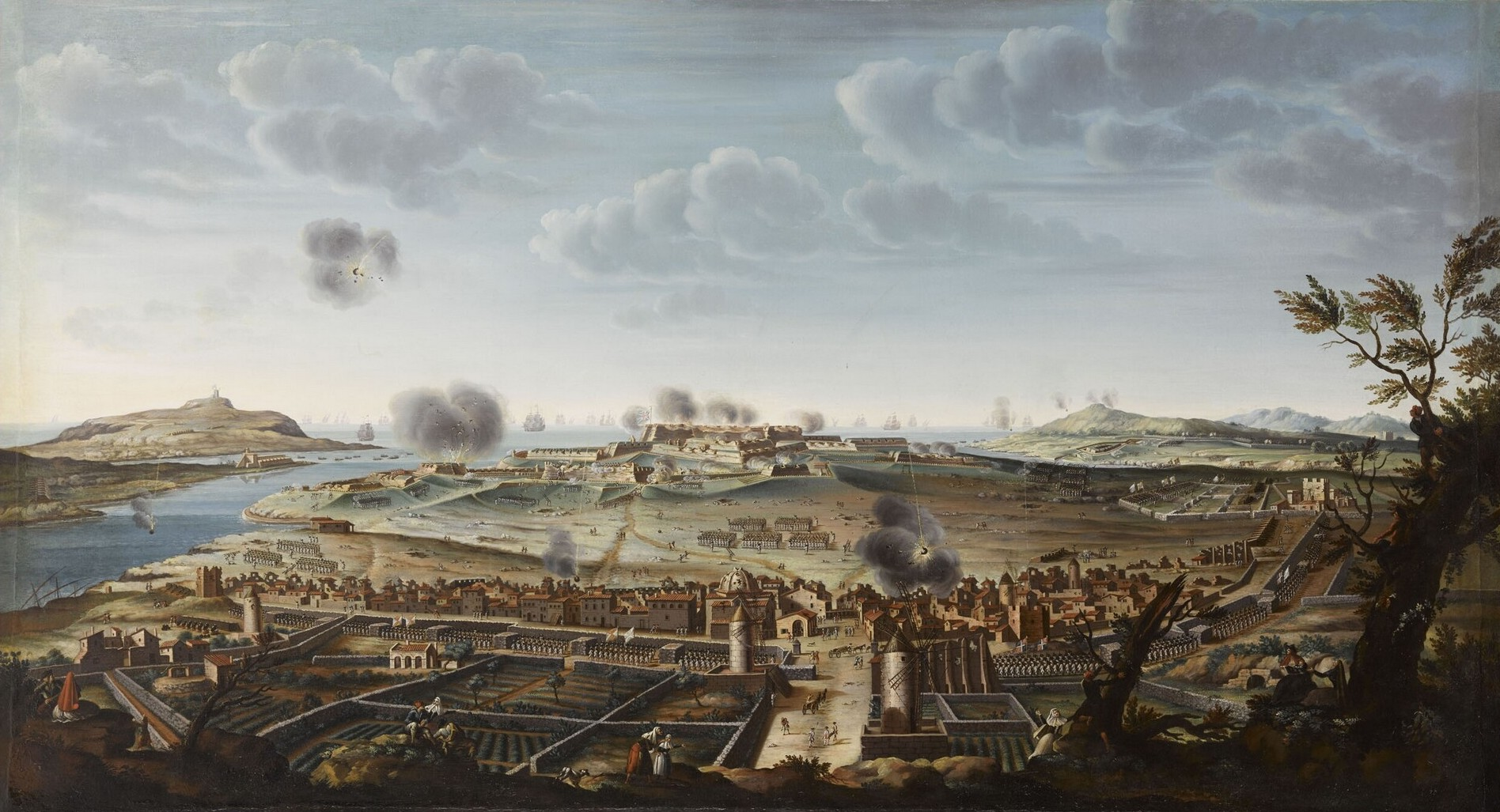
Siege of Fort St Philip (1756), which Blakeney surrendered in June 1756 after holding out for 70 days

In 1748, he was appointed lieutenant governor of Menorca, which had been captured by the British in 1708, and was considered vital for control of the Western Mediterranean. However, it was also highly vulnerable, since the Spanish deeply resented British occupation, while it was only two days sail from Cádiz, and one from the French naval base at Toulon. As Baron Tyrawley, the official governor, remained in London, Blakeney was its effective ruler. He attempted to reduce local opposition by encouraging his troops to marry local women, and by controlling Catholic schools and institutions, but neither of these measures was successful. A 1757 Parliamentary review noted the poor state of its defences, while in addition to Tyrawley, over 35 senior officers were absent, including the governor of Fort St Philip, and the colonels of all four regiments in its garrison.

Enamel plaque depicting William Blakeney, anon painter after James MacArdell after Sir George Chalmers, circa 1757, Metropolitan Museum of Art (Inv. 64.101.808)

When the Seven Years' War began in April 1756, the French quickly occupied the island and besieged Fort St Philip, which was commanded by Blakeney. An attempt by Admiral John Byng to lift the siege was repulsed in May, and Blakeney surrendered on 29 June. The garrison received free passage to Gibraltar, whose governor was Thomas Fowke, court-martialled but acquitted in 1746 for the defeat at Prestonpans. In the inquiry that followed, Fowke was dismissed for failing to provide reinforcements from the Gibraltar garrison, while Byng was executed in March 1757.

Blakeney's heavy drinking, which left him with "a paralytick disorder" and "nervous tremors", was portrayed as the pardonable trait of a simple soldier, but many considered his surrender premature. Although rewarded by being appointed to the Order of the Bath and made 'Baron Blakeney' in the Irish peerage, he was barely able to write his name due to hand tremors, and this ended his military career. He died on 20 September 1761 in Ireland and was later buried in the nave of Westminster Abbey.

== Legacy ==
Weapons drill and infantry training was a common topic among professional officers; Blakeney suggested using puppets to demonstrate drill positions to recruits. After Culloden, he was invited to demonstrate 'firings and evolutions of my own design' but in 1748, a new standard infantry drill manual was issued and Blakeney dropped his suggestions.

In 1759, a statue of Blakeney by sculptor John Van Nost and paid for by the Friendly Brothers of Saint Patrick was erected in Dublin on the location where Spire of Dublin now stands. The statue was removed in 1763 after having been severely damaged.

== Sources ==
- Blaikie, Walter Biggar, ed. (1916). Publications of the Scottish History Society (Volume Series 2, Volume 2 (March, 1916) 1737-1746). Scottish History Society.
- Browning, Reed (1994). The War of the Austrian Succession. Sutton Publishing. ISBN 978-0750905787.
- Dalton, Charles (1904). English army lists and commission registers, 1661-1714 Volume VI. Eyre & Spottiswood.
- Debrett (1792). History, Debates & Proceedings of Parliament 1743-1774; Volume III. Debrett.
- Donaldson, David Whalom (1994). Britain and Menorca in the 18th century; Volume 3. Open University.
- Duffy, Christopher (2003). The '45: Bonnie Prince Charlie and the Untold Story of the Jacobite Rising. Orion. ISBN 978-0304355259.
- Fraser, AM (August 1956). "The Friendly Brothers of St. Patrick". Dublin Historical Record. 14 (2).
- Harding, Richard (2008). "Blakeney, William, Baron Blakeney". Oxford Dictionary of National Biography (online ed.). Oxford University Press. doi:10.1093/ref:odnb/2591. (Subscription, Wikipedia Library access or UK public library membership required.)
- Henshaw, Victoria (2014). Scotland and the British Army, 1700-1750: Defending the Union. Bloomsbury 3PL. ISBN 978-1472507303.
- Houlding, John Alan (1978). The Training of the British Army 1715-1795 (PHD). King's College London.
- Lenihan, Padraig (2011). "Namur Citadel, 1695: A Case Study in Allied Siege Tactics" (PDF). War in History. 18 (3): 282–303. doi:10.1177/0968344511401296. hdl:10379/6195. S2CID 159682220.
- McGuffie, TH (1950). "The Defence of Minorca 1756". Journal of the Society for Army Historical Research. 28 (115).
- McGuffie, TH (1951). "Some fresh light on the siege of Minorca, 1756". Journal of the Society for Army Historical Research. 29 (119).
- Regan, Geoffrey (2000). Brassey's Book of Naval Blunders. Brassey's. ISBN 978-1574882537.
- Royle, Trevor (2016). Culloden; Scotland's Last Battle and the Forging of the British Empire. Little, Brown. ISBN 978-1408704011.
- Sanghvi, Neil (2017). Gentlemen of Leisure or Vital Professionals? The Officer Establishment of the British Army, 1689- 1739. PHD Thesis; St Hilda's College Oxford.
- Springman, Michael (2008). The Guards Brigade in the Crimea (2014 ed.). Pen and Sword. ISBN 978-1844156788.
- Stair-Kerr, Eric (1928). Stirling Castle: Its Place in Scottish History (Classic Reprint). Forgotten Books. ISBN 978-1331341758.
- Woodfine, PL (1987). "The War of Jenkins Ear; the Vernon-Wentworth debate". Journal of the Society for Army Historical Research. 65 (262).

Parliament of Ireland
Preceded by Kilner Brasier	Member of Parliament for Kilmallock; 1725–1757	Succeeded by Silver Oliver
Military offices
Preceded by Archibald Hamilton	Colonel, 27th Foot, later Inniskilling Regiment; 1737–1761	Succeeded by Hugh Warburton
Peerage of Ireland
New creation	Baron Blakeney; 1756–1761	Extinct
