= High Sheriff of County Galway =

Official in Ireland (c. 1569 to 1922)

The High Sheriff of County Galway was the Sovereign's judicial representative in County Galway. Initially an office for lifetime, assigned by the Sovereign, the High Sheriff became annually appointed from the Provisions of Oxford in 1258. Besides his judicial importance, he had ceremonial and administrative functions and executed High Court Writs.

The first (High) Shrivalties were established before the Norman Conquest in 1066 and date back to Saxon times. In 1908, an Order in Council made the Lord-Lieutenant the Sovereign's prime representative in a county and reduced the High Sheriff's precedence. However the office retained his responsibilities for the preservation of law and order in a county.

In Galway the office of High Sheriff was established when Connacht was shired around 1569 and ceased to exist with the establishment of the Irish Free State in 1922.

== Elizabeth I, 1558–1603 ==
- 1582: William Óge Martyn

== James I, 1603–1625 ==
- 1607: Henry Bingham / Robert Martin
- 1612: John Donelan

== Charles I, 1625–1649 ==
- 1641: William Donelan
- 1642: Ulick Burke of Castle Hacket
- 1644: Robert Martin of Ross

== English Interregnum, 1649–1660 ==
- 1655: Edward Ormsby of Tobervaddy
- 1656: Sir Arthur Gore, 1st Baronet
- 1659:

== Charles II, 1660–1685 ==
- 1660:
- 1666: Edmund Donelan of Cloghan, Roscommon
- 1672: Thomas Croadsdaile
- 1673:
- 1680: Edward Eyre
- 1681: John Eyre of Eyrecourt Castle
- 1684:

== William III, 1689–1702 ==
- 1689: John Power
- 1690:
- 1691:
- 1692:
- 1693:
- 1694: Thomas Coneys
- 1695:
- 1696: Samuel Eyre
- 1697:
- 1698:
- 1699:
- 1700: Sir George St George, 2nd Bt
- 1701: Henry Persse

== Anne, 1702–1714 ==
- 1702:
- 1703: Frederick Richard Trench
- 1704:
- 1705:
- 1706: George Eyre of Eyrecourt Castle
- 1707:
- 1708:
- 1709: Robert Blakeney of Castle Blakeney
- 1711: David Power of Corheen
- 1711: William Persse of Spring Garden
- 1712:
- 1713:

== George I, 1714–1727 ==
- 1714:
- 1720:
- 1721: Anthony Brabazon
- 1721: Thomas Croadsdaile
- 1723: Frederick Richard Trench (2nd term)
- 1724: John Eyre of Eyrecourt Castle
- 1726:

== George II, 1727–1760 ==
- 1727: John Blakeney of Abbert
- 1729: Robert Blakeney of Castle Blakeney
- 1731: Stratford Eyre
- 1734: Francis Persse of Ballymerret
- 1737: David Power of Corheen
- 1738: John Blakeney of Abbert
- 1742: Robert Persse
- 1743:
- 1744: Henry Croadsdaile of Woodford
- 1745:
- 1749: Richard Eyre
- 1754: Robert Blakeney of Abbert
- 1759:

== George III, 1760–1820 ==
- 1760:
- 1763: Theophilus Blakeney
- 1766: William Persse of Roxborough
- 1768: John Blakeney of Ashfield
- 1774: Charles French, later Sir Charles ffrench, 1st Baronet
- 1775: Richard Croadsdaile of Woodford
- 1776: Theophilus Blakeney
- 1778: James Galbraith of Cappard
- 1781: James Burke of Isercleran
- 1782: Richard Martin
- 1783: Redmond Dolphin of Corr
- 1784: Thomas Mahon of Rindify
- 1785: Martin Kirwan of Blindwell
- 1786: Michael Burke of Ballydugan
- 1789: Hyacinth Daly
- 1790: Garrett O'Moore, Snr.
- 1797: David Power of Loughrea
- 1798: Giles Eyre of Eyrecourt Castle
- 1799: William Gregory
- 1800: Sir John O'Flaherty
- 1801: Walter Lawrence
- 1802: Dominic Browne
- 1803: Frederick Trench of Garbally, Ballinasloe
- 1804: Robert O'Hara
- 1805: Sir John Taylor
- 1806: Edmond Netterville
- 1807: Arthur French St George
- 1808: John Kirwan
- 1809: Robert French
- 1810: Peter Blake
- 1811: James H. Burke and John D'Arcy
- 1812: James H. Burke
- 1813: James Staunton Lambert
- 1814: Robert Parsons Persse
- 1815: Richard Rathborne of Ballimore
- 1816: Burton Persse of Moyode Castle
- 1817: Thomas Wade
- 1818: Richard James Mansergh-St George
- 1819: John Henry Blakeney

== George IV, 1820–1830 ==
- 1820: Walter Lawrence of Lisreaghan
- 1821: Denis Henry Kelly
- 1822: William Malachy Burke of Ballydugan
- 1823: Robert Burke
- 1824: Robert Ffrench of Monivea Castle
- 1825: Edward Blake of Castlegrove, Tuam
- 1826: James Martin
- 1827: Walter Lambert of Castle Lambert
- 1828: Sir George Shee, 2nd Bt
- 1829:

== William IV, 1830–1837 ==
- 1830:
- 1833: Robert Bodkin
- 1834: James O'Hara of West Lodge
- 1835: Dudley Persse / James Knox Gildea
- 1836: John Cheevers of Killyan, Monivae

== Victoria, 1837–1901 ==
- 1837:
- 1838: Sir John Burke, 2nd Bt of Marble Hill
- 1840: Frederick Mason Trench
- 1841: Andrew William Blake of Furbough
- 1842: Denis Daly of Dunsandle
- 1843:
- 1844: Charles Kilmaine Blake / Hon. Standish Prendergast Vereker
- 1845: Denis Kirwan
- 1846: Christopher St George
- 1847: Michael Joseph Browne
- 1848: F. Blake of Creg Castle, Claregalway
- 1849: John Martin / William Henry Gregory
- 1850: Cornelius Joseph O'Kelly of Gallagh Castle
- 1851: Francis Manly Shaw Taylor
- 1852: Thomas Appleyard Joyce of Rahasane Park
- 1853: James Peter Daly
- 1854: Edward Eyre Maunsell
- 1855: Richard Andrew Hyacinth Kirwan † / succeeded by John Walter Henry Lambert of Aggard
- 1856: Stephen Roche
- 1857: FitzGerald Higgins
- 1858: Pierce Joyce of Merview, Galway
- 1859: Walter Peter Lambert of Castle Ellen
- 1860: Michael Joseph Chevers
- 1861: Cornelius Joseph O'Kelly, of Gallagh, Tuam
- 1862: Burton Robert Parsons Persse of Moyode Castle
- 1863: Richard D'Arcy of New Forest
- 1865: Hon. Luke Dillon
- 1866: John Archer Daly (né Blake) of Raford
- 1867: George Staunton Lynch-Stanton of Clydagh
- 1868: Walter Taylor Newton Shawe-Taylor of Castle Taylor
- 1869: Marcus Nicholas Lynch of Barna. / Thomas Redington Roche of Rye Hill.
- 1870: John Wilson Lynch of Duras and Renmore.
- 1873: John Blakeney of Abbert, Castle Blakeney.
- 1875: William St George Nugent, 10th Earl of Westmeath
- 1877: Hyacinth D'Arcy of New Forest.
- 1878: John Smyth of Masonbrook.
- 1879: James O'Hara of Lenaboy.
- 1880: James Francis MacDermott of Ramore.
- 1883: Sir Henry George Burke, 5th Baronet.
- 1884: Percy Brodrick Bernard of Castle Hacket.
- 1885: Robert Algernon Persse of Creg Clare, Andrahan. / Robert William Waithman
- 1886: Edward Joseph Martyn of Tulira.
- 1887: Sir Henry Grattan-Bellew, 3rd Bt.
- 1888: Stephen John Cowan.
- 1889: William Arthur Perrse.
- 1890: Francis Travers Dames-Longworth.
- 1891: Peter Fitzwalter Lambert of Castle Ellen.
- 1892: Frederic Thomas Lewin of Castlegrove.
- 1893: Francis John Graham of Drumgoon, Fermanagh and Ballinakill, Galway.
- 1894: Richard Berridge of Ballynahinch Castle.
- 1896: Hon. Robert Edward Dillon.
- 1897: Hon. Martin Morris.
- 1898: Quintin Dick Dick / Sir William Mahon, 5th Bt.
- 1899: William Arthur Persse of Roxborough.
- 1900:

== Edward VII, 1901–1910 ==
- 1901: William Daly of Dunsandal.
- 1902: William Sharp Waithman of Merlin Park.
- 1903: John Michael Aylward Lewis of Ballinagar.
- 1904: Edmond Joseph Philip Lynch-Athy of Renville.
- 1905:
- 1906: Charles Richard John O'Farrell of Dalyston.
- 1907: John Beresford Campbell of Moycullen House, Moycullen.
- 1908: John Joseph Smyth of Masonbrook.
- 1909: Arthur Henry Courtenay.
- 1910: Cecil Robert Henry of Toghermore and of Crumlin Park, Ballyglunin.

== George V, 1910–1922 ==
- 1911: Henry Thomas Hall.
- 1912: Pierce John Joyce.
- 1913: Thomas Frederic Lewin.
- 1914: Charles Randolph Kilkelly.
- 1915: Francis Manley Shawe-Taylor.
- 1916:
- 1917: Nicholas O'Connell Comyn.
- 1918:
- 1919: Charles Trench O'Rorke.
- 1920: James Gunning Alcorn.
- 1922:

== Notes ==
† ?
