= John Blakeney (died 1747) =

Irish politician

John Blakeney (c. 1703 – 21 August 1747) was an Irish Member of Parliament.

He was born the son of Robert Blakeney and Sarah née Ormsby Blakeney.

He was High Sheriff of County Galway for 1727 and 1738 and then represented Athenry in the Irish House of Commons from November 1727 to his death.

He married Grace Persse, daughter of Henry Persse of Roxborough, and was the father of Robert Blakeney, John Blakeney, Theophilus Blakeney and William Blakeney. He lived at Abbert, near Monivea.
