= Ben Bruce Blakeney =

American lawyer

Benjamin Bruce Blakeney (July 30, 1908, Shawnee, Oklahoma – March 4, 1963) was an American lawyer who served with the rank of major during the Second World War in the Pacific theater. He is best known for his work for the defense at the Tokyo War Crimes Tribunal.

== International Military Tribunal of the Far East ==
In 1946–1948, he served as a defense counsel at the Tokyo War Crimes Tribunal, and defended Shigenori Tōgō. Tōgō's role at the trial was a significant one, since he was a member of the civilian government, not a military official. Tōgō was ultimately depicted as a reluctant participant in Hideki Tojo's war cabinet and in Japanese empire-building more generally, in spite of his having led the Greater East Asia Ministry after 1943. Tōgō was spared the death penalty and instead declared guilty of five of the nine counts against him and sentenced to 20 years imprisonment. Blakeney concurrently served as defense counsel for General Yoshijirō Umezu, who was sentenced to life imprisonment.

Blakeney's arguments at the Tokyo Trials in May 1946 have attracted attention from some Japanese audiences. Some of his statements have been interpreted as critical of the trial's overall hypocrisy, particularly one statement which criticized censorship of discussion of the atomic bombings of Japan. Right-wing artist Kobayashi Yoshinori's 2006 manga "Class-A War Criminals" brought this speech into further notoriety. In the most heavily quoted excerpt from his remarks, Blakeney noted that killing by a nation, wartime or peacetime, and even waging a war of aggression, could not be considered crime under international law. The defense counsel for Togo briefly juxtaposed the atomic bombing of Hiroshima in relation to the attack on Pearl Harbor, saying:

If the killing of Admiral Kidd by the bombing of Pearl Harbor is murder, we know the name of the very man who[se] hands loosed the atomic bomb on Hiroshima, we know the chief of staff who planned the act, we know the chief of the responsible state. Is murder on their consciences? We may well doubt it. We may well doubt it, and not because the event of armed conflict has declared their cause just and their enemies unjust, but because the act is not murder. Show us the charge, produce the proof of the killing contrary to the laws and customs of war, name the man whose hand dealt the blow, produce the responsible superior who planned, ordered, permitted or acquiesced in this act, and you have brought a criminal to the bar of justice.

Blakeney's speech was covered in the New York Times, but was overshadowed the same day in the courtroom by an incident where Shūmei Ōkawa slapped Tojo Hideki and made a scene later by crying and praying. In the months following, a number of defense counsel resigned, but Blakeney continued his work for the defense team, arguing that the court should not create a double standard where the Japanese were punished but others were allowed to go free for committing acts of war.

In August 1947, Blakeney reviewed the history of US-Japan unsuccessful negotiations that led to war in December 1941, emphasizing that the Tojo cabinet had not predetermined to attack the United States, but that the US communication to Japan on November 26, 1941 was the final trigger on the decision to go to war with the United States.

On November 19, 1948, one week after the sentences had been handed down, Blakeney produced a review of his defendant's case for General Douglas MacArthur.

Blakeney, together with defense attorney George Furness, filed an appeal with the Supreme Court of the United States on behalf of the convicted Japanese officials, arguing that the ruling could not be upheld because General Douglas MacArthur had acted unconstitutionally in constituting the tribunal. The appeal was denied.

After the International Military Tribunal for the Far East concluded, Blakeney defended Admiral Soemu Toyoda in one of the more significant postwar cases regarding the doctrine of command responsibility.

== Later life ==
In 1949, he began work as a lecturer of law at Tokyo University. Blakeney later worked with Tōgō Fumihiko to translate and edit The Cause of Japan, a book which had been drafted by an ill Tōgō Shigenori. The book included an extensive introduction by Blakeney, but was criticised quickly after its publication in English in 1956. One reviewer called the book "pedantic and impersonal...[it] placed an embarrassing amount of responsibility [for war] at the door of the United States."

Bruce Blakeney was killed in a plane crash in 1963.

== Works ==
- "The Japanese High Command", Military Affairs, Vol. 9, No. 2 (Summer, 1945), pp. 95–113 and No. 3 (Autumn, 1945), pp. 208–218
- A Sketch of the development of Japanese law. 1960. OCLC 469291130.
