= Athenry (Parliament of Ireland constituency) =

Pre-1801 Irish constituency

- Former borough constituency for the Irish House of Commons
- County: County Galway
- Borough: Athenry

1378–1801
- Seats: 2
- Replaced by: Disfranchised

Athenry was a constituency represented in the Irish House of Commons until its abolition on 1 January 1801.

== History ==
Athenry was represented as early as 1378.

In the first Parliament of Elizabeth, Athenry was represented by Thomas Cusack, former Lord Chancellor of Ireland, and Andrew Browne. In Elizabeth's second Parliament, one of its representatives was John Hooker, an Englishman. Hooker wrote the Irish additions to the 1587 update of Holinshed's Chronicles, in which he describes his own participation in a debate on a bill for the impost of wines.

In the Patriot Parliament of 1689 summoned by King James II, Athenry was represented with two members.

== Members of Parliament ==
- 1559 Sir Thomas Cusack and Andrew Browne
- 1569 John Hooker and another
- 1585 William Browne and Nicholas Lynch
- 1613–1615 Stephen Browne and Ludovic Bodkin
- 1634–1635 David Burke and Richard Martyn
- 1639–1649 Geoffrey Browne and John Blake alias Caddell
- 1661 Henry Whaley and Sir Henry Waddington

=== 1689–1801 ===
Election	First MP	Second MP
1689	James Talbot	Charles Daly
1692	Edward Pearce	Richard Whaley
1695	John Ormsby	Richard Whaley
1721	Robert Blakeney	Richard Whaley
1725	Robert Blakeney	Arthur Ormsby
1727	Robert Blakeney	John Blakeney
1733	Thomas Bolton	John Blakeney
1741	James Daly	John Blakeney
1747	James Daly	Robert Blakeney
1763	James Daly	John Blakeney
1768	Theophilus Blakeney	John Blakeney
1776	John Blakeney	John Blakeney
1781	William Blakeney	John Blakeney
1783	Theophilus Blakeney	John Blakeney
1790	Theophilus Blakeney	William Blakeney
1800	William Needham	Michael Burke
1801	Constituency disenfranchised	

== Bibliography ==
- O'Hart, John (2007). The Irish and Anglo-Irish Landed Gentry: When Cromwell came to Ireland. Vol. II. Heritage Books. ISBN 978-0-7884-1927-0.
- Leigh Rayment's historical List of Members of the Irish House of Commons. Cites: Johnston-Liik, Edith Mary (2002). The History of the Irish Parliament 1692-1800 (6 volumes). Ulster Historical Foundation.
