= John Eyre (settler) =

Mayor Galway, English Cromwellian settler in Ireland (died 1685)

John Eyre (died 1685) was an English Cromwellian settler in Ireland who became Mayor of Galway.

== Early life ==
Eyre was born in Wiltshire, England, in the early 17th century, the son of Giles Eyre and Jane Snelgrove. The couple had ten sons and five daughters, John been the seventh son. They attended All Saints Church, Whiteparish, where Giles and Jane are buried. Their funerary memorial, located within the church, reads:

Buried here Gyles Eyre Esqre and Jane his wife. A man much oppressed by publick power for his laudable opposition to the measures taken in the reigns of James I and Charles I In the year 1640 (for then well known Court reasons) He was ... afterwards plundered at Brickworth of 2000 l. value and imprisoned for refusing to pay the sum of 400 l. illeg 1572 dyed Jan 1655 having issue 7 sons (3 of whom were likewise members of Parliament) and 4 daughters.

== In Ireland and Galway ==
Eyre and his younger brother Edward were officers in the forces of the Parliament, Eyre rising to the rank of major. In 1649 the brothers arrived in Dublin as part an invasion force of 12,000 men led by Oliver Cromwell. They saw service mainly under the command of Edward Ludlow.

Eyre is mentioned as one of the officers with Ludlow when he arrived at Galway in 1651. With the surrender of the town in April 1652 the war ended, and the brothers began securing much property seized from Irish Roman Catholics, within the town and also in other parts of County Galway. Much land was made over to Cromwellian officers who were owed substantial pay arrears. Eyre's main landed estates were in the south-east of the county, dispossessing families such as Kelly, Madden, Horan, and Burke. In this area, known in Irish as Síol Anmchadha, Eyre created the town of Eyrecourt and his main residence. This continued to be the home of generations of the family.

== The Restoration and after ==
John and Edward Eyre were both returned as members of the Irish parliament in 1661, and John moved strongly to help preserve the settlements that had allowed them to become men of substance. However, he was absent on a number of occasions, apparently due to a serious dispute involving his brother, and Robert Martin of Ross, back in Galway.

In September 1661 John Eyre was appointed Mayor of Galway, Edward Eyre been re-appointed Recorder. Disputes between the Protestant settlers and Catholics attempting to regain lost property continued, members of families such as Browne, French, Martin, Lynch (see The Tribes of Galway) continued, but despite legal disputes that lasted years, none of them regained the substance of their property. In 1681, he was appointed High Sheriff of County Galway.

Summing up his life, John Cronin states:

John Eyre played a not insignificant part in radically altering mid-to-late seventeenth century Galway. ... he helped overthrow those landed Catholic families that had previously dominated the region, and well as to establish the supremacy of Protestant grandees within the area. He weakened the influence of the established Protestant church within Galway by depriving it of wealth and almost contemporaneously altered the religious make-up of the county by introducing Protestant settlers. ... To top it all off he developed a town and built a distinguished mansion ... he provides us with examples of tactics and strategies for social, economic and political advancement in early modern Ireland.

== Personal life ==
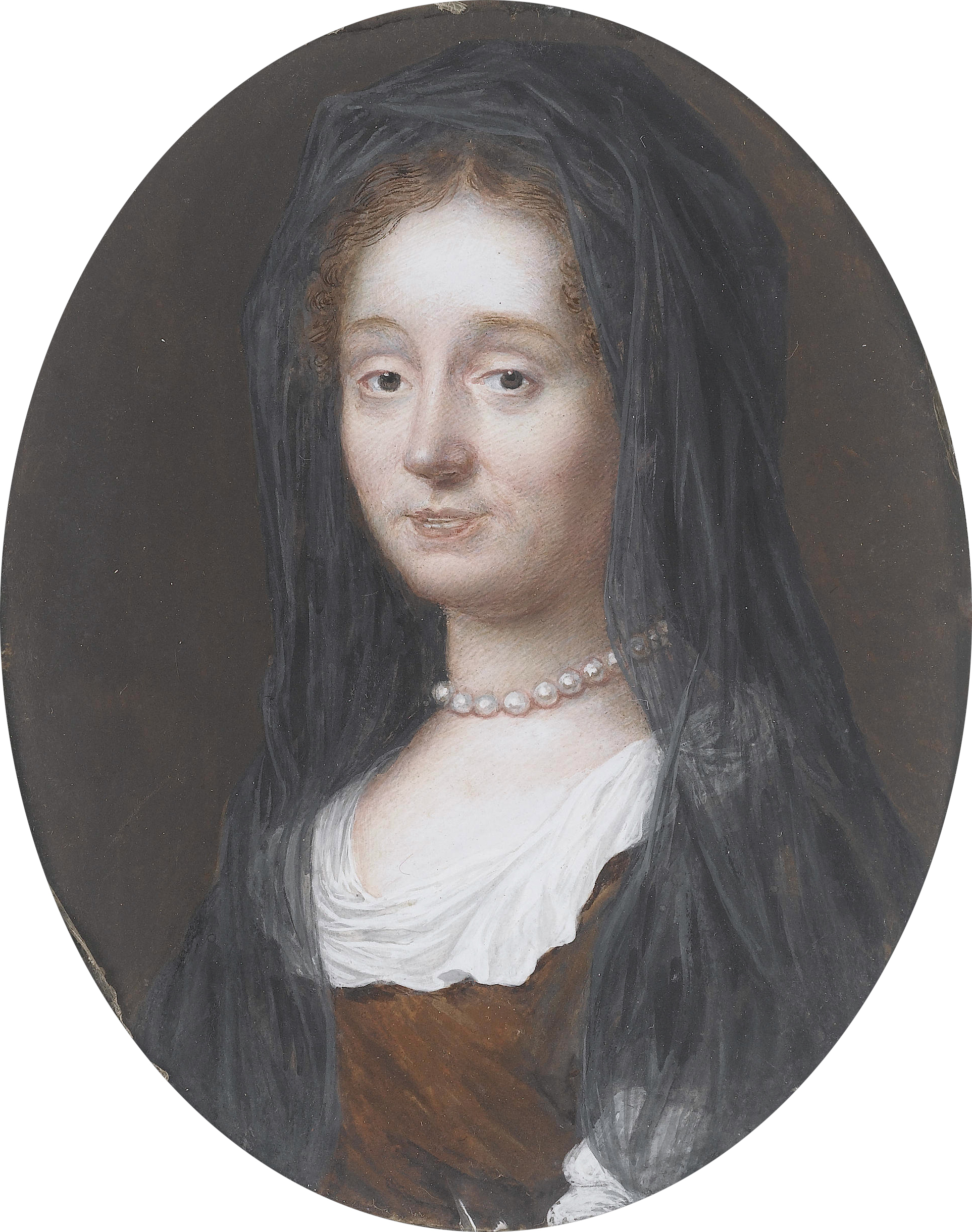
Mary Eyre, née Bigoe (attributed to William Gibson (British, circa 1644–1702))

John Eyre married Mary Bigoe, daughter of Phillip Bigoe of Newtown, Lusmagh, County Offaly, in the 1650s. The first of their six children, John, was born in 1659. Samuel, Rowland (died young), Katherine (died young), Mary and Anne. The family remained important landowners and local politicians into the early 20th-century.

== Notes ==
Civic offices
Preceded by John Morgan	Mayor of Galway; 1661–1662	Succeeded by Henry Greneway
