= Theophilus Blakeney =

Irish politician (1730–1813)

Theophilus Blakeney (c. 1730 – 22 September 1813) was an Irish politician.

He was born the son of MP John Blakeney and his wife Grace Persse of Roxborough House, County Galway, and was a brother of Robert, John and William Blakeney.

He served as a Member of Parliament (MP) for Athenry from 1768 to 1776 and from 1783 to 1799. During the intervening period, he was MP for Carlingford. He saw service with the British army at Quebec and Staten Island in 1761 while Captain in the Royal Sussex Regiment. In 1763 and again in 1776, he was appointed High Sheriff of County Galway. From 1772 he served as Surveyor General for Connacht. He married in 1782 to Margaret Stafford of Gillstown, County Roscommon. Their son was John Henry Blakeney. Their daughter Bridget married Sir Richard St George, 2nd Baronet, and had several children.

== Notes ==
Parliament of Ireland
Preceded by James Daly; John Blakeney	Member of Parliament for Athenry; 1769–1776; With: John Blakeney	Succeeded by John Blakeney; John Blakeney
Preceded by Robert Ross; Blayney Townley-Balfour	Member of Parliament for Carlingford; 1776–1783; With: Thomas Knox	Succeeded by Sir John Blaquiere; Thomas Coghlan
Preceded by William Blakeney; John Blakeney	Member of Parliament for Athenry; 1783–1800; With: John Blakeney 1783–1789; William Blakeney 1790–1800	Succeeded by William Needham; Michael Burke
