= Robert Blakeney (died 1762) =

Irish politician

Robert Blakeney (c. 1724 – 30 December 1762) was an Irish Member of Parliament.

He was born the son of John Blakeney and Grace Persse and was the brother of Theophilus, John and William Blakeney.

He sat in the Irish House of Commons for Athenry from 1747 to his death. He served as High Sheriff of County Galway in 1754.

He married Gertrude Blakeney, daughter of Major Robert Blakeney on 28 May 1752. Their son John Blakeney also later sat as an MP for the borough.
