= William Blakeney (died 1804) =

Irish politician and British Army officer

Major William Blakeney (1735 – 2 November 1804) was an Irish British Army officer and politician.

He was born the son of Irish MP John Blakeney and Grace Perrse, and was the brother of Robert, John and Theophilus Blakeney.

As a soldier in the British Army William Blakeney fought in the German War at the Battle of Rheinberg (1758), during which he was wounded and at the Battle of Minden (1759), when he was again wounded. Captain Blakeney then fought in the American War of Independence at the Battle of Bunker Hill (1775), where he was yet again severely wounded. He retired at the rank of major in 1779.

He sat in the Irish House of Commons for Athenry from 1781 to 1783 and again from 1790 to 1800.

He married Sarah Shields, daughter of Samuel Shields, on 6 September 1770 and was the father of Edward Blakeney.
