= Edward Blakeney =

British Army officer

Field Marshal The Right Honourable Sir Edward Blakeney GCB GCH
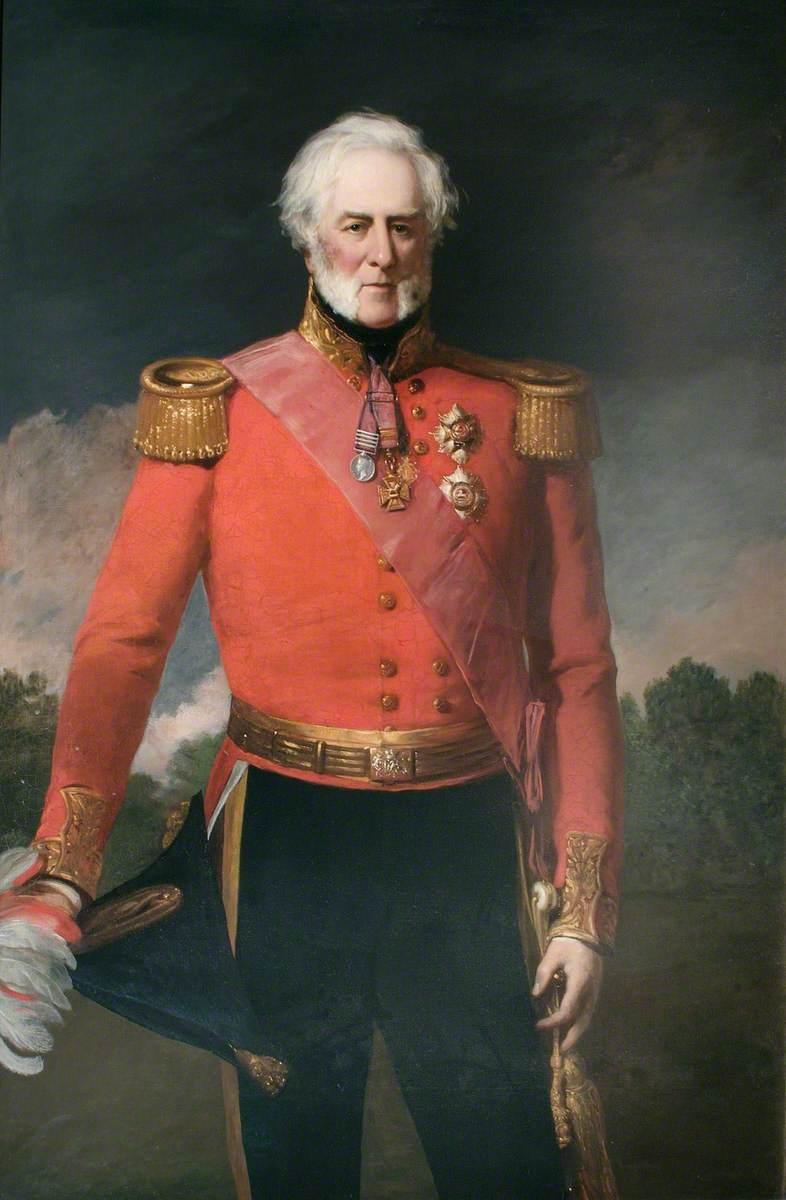
- Blakeney, c. 1840
- Born: 26 March 1778; Newcastle upon Tyne, England
- Died: 2 August 1868 (aged 90); Chelsea, London
- Military career
- Allegiance: Great Britain; United Kingdom
- Branch: British Army
- Service years: 1794–1855
- Rank: Field Marshal
- Commands: Commander-in-Chief, Ireland
- Conflicts: French Revolutionary Wars; Peninsular War; War of 1812
- Awards: Knight Grand Cross of the Order of the Bath; Knight Grand Cross of the Royal Guelphic Order
- Other work: Governor of Royal Hospital Chelsea

Field Marshal Sir Edward Blakeney GCB GCH PC (Ire) (26 March 1778 – 2 August 1868) was a British Army officer. After taking part in the British occupation of Dutch Guiana as a junior officer and being taken prisoner by privateers three times, he participated in the Anglo-Russian invasion of Holland in 1799. Blakeney subsequently joined the expedition to Denmark led by Lord Cathcart in 1807. He went on to command the 2nd Battalion of the 7th Regiment of Foot and then both battalions of that regiment in many of the battles of the Peninsular War. After joining the Duke of Wellington as he marched into Paris in 1815, Blakeney fought in the War of 1812. He then commanded a brigade in the army sent on a mission to Portugal to support the constitutional government against the absolutist forces of Miguel I of Portugal in 1826. Blakeney's last major appointment was as Commander-in-Chief, Ireland, a post he held for nearly twenty years.

== Early life ==
Born the fourth son of Colonel William Blakeney and Sarah Blakeney (née Shields), Blakeney was commissioned as a cornet in the 8th Light Dragoons on 28 February 1794. He was promoted to lieutenant in the 121st Regiment of Foot on 4 September 1794 and to captain in the 99th Regiment of Foot on 24 December 1794. He took part in the expedition to Dutch Guiana in 1796 and was taken prisoner by privateers three times suffering great hardship. He also took part in the evacuation of Santo Domingo in 1798.

Blakeney transferred to the 17th Regiment of Foot on 10 March 1798 and saw action at the Battle of Krabbendam and the Battle of Bergen both in September 1799 and the Battle of Alkmaar and the Battle of Castricum both in October 1799 during the Anglo-Russian invasion of Holland. Promoted to major on 17 September 1801, he transferred to the 47th Regiment of Foot on 11 July 1803. After transferring again, this time to the 7th Regiment of Foot on 7 April 1804, he joined the expedition to Denmark led by Lord Cathcart, took part in the Battle of Copenhagen in August 1807 and, having been promoted to lieutenant colonel on 7 May 1808, also took part in the capture of Martinique in February 1809. He undertook garrison duty in Nova Scotia later that year.

== Peninsular War ==
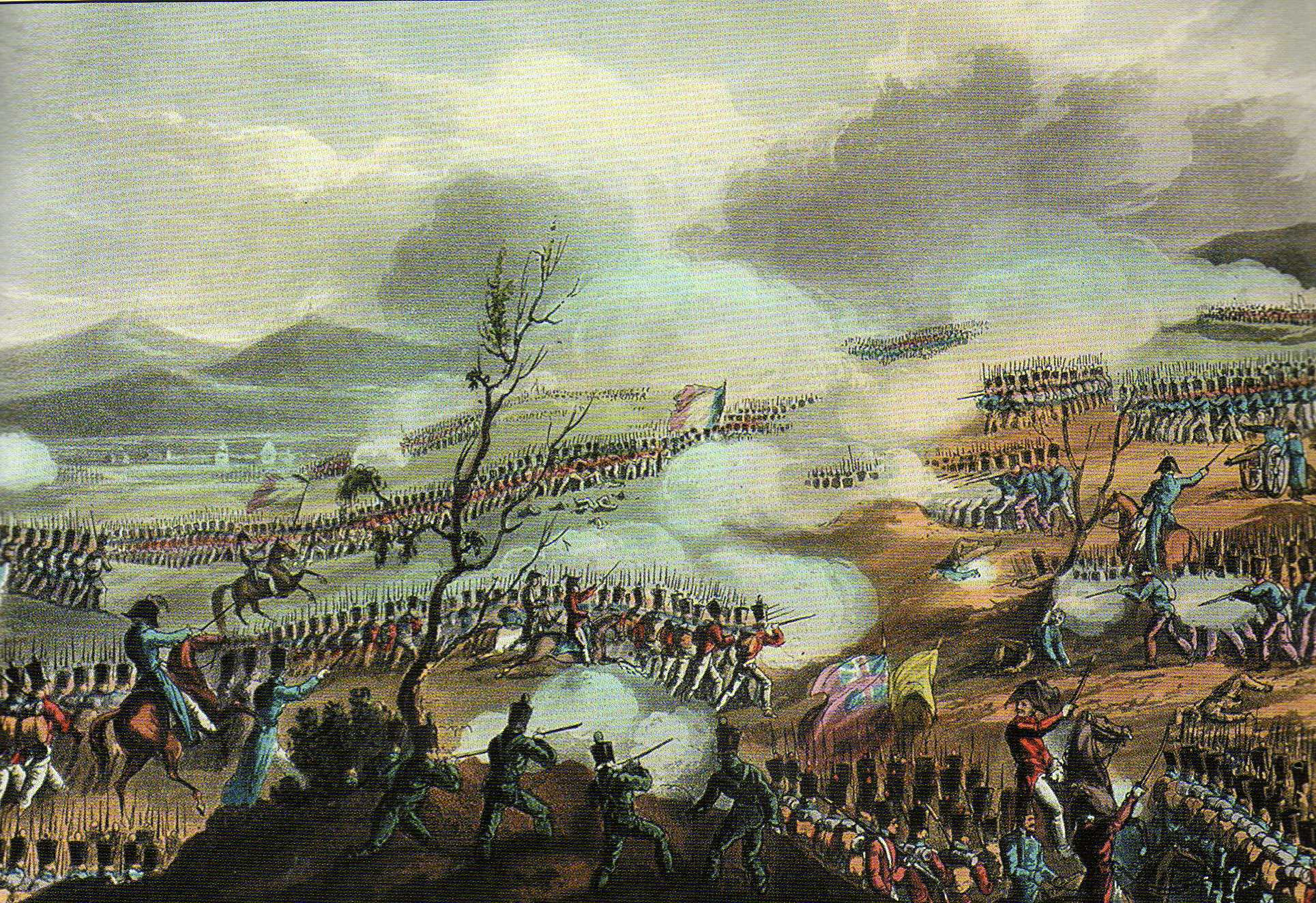
The Battle of Nivelle: Blakeney commanded the 7th Regiment of Foot at this battle in November 1813

Blakeney joined Sir Arthur Wellesley in Spain in June 1810 and commanded the 2nd Battalion of his regiment during the Battle of Bussaco in September 1810 and the Battle of Albuera (where he was severely wounded in the thigh) in May 1811. He commanded both battalions of his regiment at the Combat of Aldea da Ponte in September 1811, at the Siege of Ciudad Rodrigo in January 1812 and at the Siege of Badajoz (where he was severely wounded through the arm in the assault) in April 1812. He also commanded at the Battle of Vitoria in June 1813, at the Combat of Pampelona in June 1813 and at the Battle of the Pyrenees in July 1813 as well as the Battle of Nivelle in November 1813. Promoted to colonel on 4 June 1814 and appointed a Knight Commander of the Order of the Bath on 2 January 1815, he fought at the Battle of New Orleans in January 1815 during the War of 1812. Although he did not take part in the Hundred Days, he joined the Duke of Wellington as he marched into Paris in 1815 and served with the Army of Occupation in France until 1819.

== Later years ==
Promoted to major general on 27 May 1825, Blakeney commanded a brigade in the army under General Henry Clinton sent on a mission to Portugal to support the constitutional government against the absolutist forces of Dom Miguel in 1826.

Blakeney went on to become Commander-in-Chief, Ireland in Spring 1836. He was appointed a Lord Justice of Ireland on 7 May 1836 and promoted to the local rank of lieutenant-general on 26 August 1836 and to the substantive rank of lieutenant-general on 28 June 1838. He was advanced to Knight Grand Cross of the Bath on 7 May 1849 and, having been promoted to full general on 20 June 1854, retired from active service in 1855.

Blakeney also served as honorary colonel of the 7th Regiment of Foot, then as honorary colonel of the 1st Regiment of Foot and later as colonel-in-chief of the Rifle Brigade as well as honorary colonel of the St. George's Rifle Volunteer Corps. He became lieutenant-governor of the Royal Hospital Chelsea on 6 February 1855 and then succeeded as Governor of that establishment on 25 September 1856.

In retirement Blakeney lived at Richmond House in Twickenham. Promoted to field marshal on 9 November 1862, he died at the Royal Hospital Chelsea on 2 August 1868 and was buried at Oak Lane Cemetery in Twickenham.

== Family ==
In 1814 Blakeney married Maria Gardiner, a daughter of Colonel Gardiner of the East India Company; they had no children.

== Sources ==
- Dod, Robert P. (1860). The Peerage, Baronetage and Knightage of Great Britain and Ireland. London: Whitaker and Co. pp. 120–121.
- Heathcote, Tony (1999). The British Field Marshals, 1736–1997: A Biographical Dictionary. Barnsley: Leo Cooper. ISBN 0-85052-696-5.
- Saville, John (1990). 1848: The British State and the Chartist Movement. Cambridge University Press. ISBN 978-0521396561.

Honorary titles
Preceded by Sir Alured Clarke	Colonel of the 7th Regiment of Foot; 1832–1854	Succeeded by Sir George Brown
Preceded by Sir James Kempt	Colonel of the 1st Regiment of Foot; 1854–1868	Succeeded by Sir George Bell
Preceded by Sir George Brown	Colonel-in-Chief of the Rifle Brigade; 1865–1868	Succeeded by The Prince of Wales
Military offices
Preceded by Sir Hussey Vivian	Commander-in-Chief, Ireland; 1836–1855	Succeeded by The Lord Seaton
Honorary titles
Preceded by Sir Colin Halkett	Governor, Royal Hospital Chelsea; 1856–1868	Succeeded by Sir Alexander Woodford
