= John Blakeney (died 1781) =

Irish politician (1756–1781)

Member of the Irish House of Commons
- In office 1776–1781

Military service
- Rank: Lieutenant
- Unit: 14th Dragoons

John Blakeney (12 September 1756 – 23 August 1781) was an Irish member of parliament.

The son of Robert Blakeney, he was elected to the Irish House of Commons for the family borough of Athenry in June 1776, sitting until his death at age 24. He also served in the army as a Lieutenant in the 14th Dragoons.
