= Blake (surname) =

Blake is a surname which originated from Old English. Its derivation is uncertain; it could come from "blac", a nickname for someone who had dark hair or skin, or from "blaac", a nickname for someone with pale hair or skin. Another theory, presumably in the belief it is a Welsh patronymic in origin, for which there is no evidence, was that it is a corruption of "Ap Lake", meaning "Son of Lake".

Blake was the name of one of the 14 Tribes of Galway in Ireland. These Blakes were descendants of Richard Caddell, alias Blake, who was involved in the Norman invasion of Ireland in 1169. As such a long present foreign name, it became known as de Bláca in Irish.

The origins of the name Blake are also considered to be Old Norse, first appearing in Yorkshire, England, possibly derived from the word Blaker, referring to a village and a former municipality of Akershus county, Norway (east of Oslo).

Blake often refers to the British poet, painter and printmaker William Blake (1757–1827).

== Notable people with the surname "Blake" include ==
=== A ===
- Ackeem Blake (born 2002), Jamaican sprinter
- Adam Blake (musician) (born 1976), English musician
- Adrian Blake (born 2005), English footballer
- Aisling Blake (born 1981), Irish squash player
- Alan Blake (1922–2010), New Zealand rugby union footballer
- Alan Blake (rugby league), Australian rugby league footballer
- Alex Blake (disambiguation), multiple people
- Alfonso Corona Blake (1919–1999), Mexican film director
- Alfred Blake (1915–2013), British politician
- Ally Blake, Australian writer
- Amanda Blake (1929–1989), American actress
- Andre Blake (born 1990), Jamaican footballer
- Andrew Blake (disambiguation), multiple people
- Ann Blake, Irish musician
- Anna Blake (disambiguation), multiple people
- Annie Blake, Canadian politician
- Anthony Blake (disambiguation), multiple people
- Arron Blake (born 1987), English actor
- Archie Blake (mathematician) (1906–??), American mathematician
- Arthur Blake (disambiguation), multiple people
- Asha Blake (born 1961), American journalist
- Ashley Blake (born 1969), British television presenter
- Ashley Herring Blake, American author
- Avery Blake (1907–1975), American lacrosse player
- Axel Blake (born 1988), English comedian

=== B ===
- Bandsman Jack Blake (1890–1960), British boxer
- Barbara Hibbs Blake (1937–2019), American professor
- Barry Blake (born 1937), Australian linguist
- Benjamin Blake (musician) (1751–1827), English violinist
- Bernard Blake (born 1992), American football player
- Bert Blake (1908–1986), English footballer
- Betty Blake (1931–1982), American preservationist
- Betty Tackaberry Blake (1920–2015), American pilot
- Billy Blake (1902–??), English footballer
- Blind Blake (1896–1934), American musician
- Bob Blake (disambiguation), multiple people
- Bobby Blake (born 1957), American religious figure
- Brayon Blake (born 1995), American basketball player
- Brian Blake (disambiguation), multiple people
- Brock Blake, American entrepreneur
- Bruce Blake (judge) (1881–1957), American judge
- Bruce P. Blake, American bishop
- Bud Blake (1918–2005), American cartoonist

=== C ===
- Callum Blake (born 1994), Ni-Vanuata cricketer
- Caroline Blake (1835–1919), Irish landlord
- Caroline Placide Waring Blake (1798–1881), American actress
- Casey Blake (born 1973), American baseball player
- Casey Nelson Blake, American historian
- Catherine Blake (disambiguation), multiple people
- Charles Blake (disambiguation), multiple people
- Charlotte Blake (1885–1979), American composer
- Chris Blake (born 1971), Welsh lawn bowler
- Christian Blake (born 1996), American football player
- Christopher Blake (1949–2004), English actor
- Christopher Blake (archer) (born 1953), Australian archer
- Cliff Blake, Australian agriculturalist
- Curtis Blake (1917–2019), American businessman
- Cyril Blake (1900–1951), Trinidadian trumpeter

=== D ===
- Dan Blake (1882–1953), American football player
- Darcy Blake (born 1988), Welsh footballer
- David Blake (disambiguation), multiple people
- Dave Blake (1925–2008), Canadian politician
- Dennis Blake (born 1970), Jamaican sprinter
- Derek Blake, British researcher
- Dominick Blake (priest) (1806–1859), Irish clergyman
- Dominique Blake (born 1987), Jamaican sprinter
- Donald Blake (disambiguation), multiple people
- Donovan Blake (born 1961), Jamaican-American cricketer
- Doris Blake (disambiguation), multiple people
- Dusty Blake (born 1982), American baseball coach

=== E ===
- Ed Blake (1925–2009), American baseball player
- Eddie Blake (disambiguation), multiple people
- Edith Blake (1846–1926), Irish illustrator
- Edith Blake (tennis) (1861–1939), English tennis player
- Edmond Blake (1803–1895), American politician
- Edward Blake (1833–1912), Canadian politician
- Edward Reed Blake (1844–1932), American politician
- Edwin Blake (1830–1914), New Zealand politician
- E. E. Blake (1879–1961), English businessman
- Eileen Blake (1878–1957), British artist
- Elijah Blake (born 1982), Dominican-American singer
- Eli Whitney Blake (1795–1886), American inventor
- Eli Whitney Blake Jr. (1836–1895), American scientist
- Emmet Reid Blake (1908–1997), American ornithologist
- Eric Blake (born 1946), British boxer
- Ernest Blake (disambiguation), multiple people
- Ernie Blake (1913–1989), German entrepreneur
- Esther McGowin Blake (1897–1979), American pilot
- Eubie Blake (1887–1983), American pianist
- Eugene Carson Blake (1906–1985), American religious figure
- Euphemia Vale Blake (1817–1904), American author
- Evon Blake (1906–1988), Jamaican journalist

=== F ===
- Florence Blake (1907–1983), American nurse
- Florence Turner Blake (1873–1959), Australian teacher
- Francis Blake (disambiguation), multiple people
- Frank Blake (disambiguation), multiple people
- Frederic Columbus Blake, American engineer
- Frederick Blake (disambiguation), multiple people

=== G ===
- Geoffrey Blake (disambiguation), multiple people
- George Blake (disambiguation), multiple people
- Gerald Blake (disambiguation), multiple people
- Gil Blake, American investor
- Gillian Blake (born 1949), British actress
- Gladys Blake (1910–1983), American character actress
- Gladys Blake (writer), American writer
- Gordon Blake (1910–1997), American general
- Grey Blake (1902–1971), British actor

=== H ===
- Hamish Blake (born 1981), Australian comedian
- Harold Henry Blake (1883–1960), British medical officer
- Harris Blake (1929–2014), American politician
- Harrison G. O. Blake (1818–1876), American politician
- Harry Blake (disambiguation), multiple people
- Helen Blake (born 1951), Jamaican sprinter
- Henry Blake (disambiguation), multiple people
- Herbert Blake (1894–1958), English footballer
- Homer C. Blake (1822–1880), American naval officer
- Howard Blake (born 1938), British composer

=== I ===
- Inés Joyes y Blake (1731–1808), Spanish translator
- Isidore Blake (1812–1882), Irish-Australian politician

=== J ===
- Jack Blake (born 1994), English footballer
- Jackson Blake (born 2003), American ice hockey player
- James Blake (disambiguation), multiple people
- Jameson Blake (born 1997), Filipino-American actor
- Jamie Blake (born 1975), American singer-songwriter
- Jan Blake (fl 1988), British storyteller
- Janet Blake (??–1981), Canadian-American farmer
- Jared Blake, American singer
- Jason Blake (disambiguation), multiple people
- Jay Don Blake (born 1958), American golfer
- Jeff Blake (born 1970), American football player
- Jennifer Blake (disambiguation), multiple people
- Jere Blake (1875–1933), Welsh rugby union footballer
- Jeremy Blake (1971–2007), American video artist and painter
- Jerome Blake (born 1995), Canadian athlete
- Jerry Blake (1908–1961), American saxophonist
- Jim Blake (Australian politician) (1921–2010), Australian politician
- Joaquín Blake (1759–1827), Spanish military officer
- Joe Blake (1882–1931), English footballer
- Joey Blake (born 1967), American tennis player
- John Blake (disambiguation), multiple people
- Johnathan Blake (born 1976), American drummer
- Johnny Blake (born 1930), Australian rules footballer
- Jon Blake (disambiguation), multiple people
- Jonathan Blake (born 1987), American basketball player
- Jonathan Blake (activist) (born 1949), British activist
- Jorge Méndez Blake (born 1974), Mexican artist
- Joseph Blake (disambiguation), multiple people
- Josh Blake (born 1998), English cricketer
- J. P. Blake (1874–1950), British politician
- Judith Blake (disambiguation), multiple people
- Julia Blake (born 1936), British-Australian actress
- Juliet Blake, British-American film producer

=== K ===
- Karen Blake, American disk jockey
- Karl Blake (born 1956), English musician
- Katherine Blake (actress) (1921–1991), South African-born British actress
- Katharine Blake (singer) (born 1970), British singer
- Kathy Blake (born 1946), American tennis player
- Kayla Blake (born 1963), American actress
- Kendare Blake, American author
- Korban Blake, British author

=== L ===
- Larry Blake (disambiguation), multiple people
- Leslie Russell Blake (1890–1918), Australian geologist and surveyor
- Lillie Devereux Blake (1835–1913), American suffragist
- Loretta Blake (1898–1981), American actress
- Lottie Isbell Blake (1876–1976), American physician
- Lucien Blake (1853–1916), American physicist and engineer
- Lucius S. Blake (1816–1894), American businessman
- Lucy Blake, American conservationist
- Luke Blake, English rugby league footballer
- Lyman Reed Blake (1835–1883), American inventor
- Lynda Goodsell Blake (1906–1989), American missionary

=== M ===
- Madge Blake (1899–1969), American actress
- Margaret Day Blake (1876–1971), American art collector
- Marion Elizabeth Blake (1892–1961), American professor
- Mark Blake (disambiguation), multiple people
- Marsha Stephanie Blake (born 1974), American actress
- Martin Blake (disambiguation), multiple people
- Marty Blake (1927–2013), American basketball executive
- Matthew Blake (disambiguation), multiple people
- Maurice Blake (disambiguation), multiple people
- M. Brian Blake (born 1971), American computer engineer
- Megan Blake (born 1959), American actress
- Melanie Blake (born 1976), English talent agent and author
- Melissa Blake, Canadian politician
- Mervyn Blake (1907–2003), Canadian actor
- Michael Blake (disambiguation), multiple people
- Mick Blake (1874–1931), Australian rules footballer
- Mickey Blake (1912–2000), Canadian ice hockey player
- Millicent Kittredge Blake (1822–1907), American educational pioneer
- Minden Blake (1913–1981), New Zealand pilot
- Molly Blake (1917–2011), British illustrator
- Morgan Blake (1889–1953), American sportswriter

=== N ===
- Naomi Blake (1924–2018), British sculptor
- Natalie Blake (born 1982), British powerlifter
- Nathan Blake (born 1972), Welsh footballer
- Nayland Blake (born 1960), American artist
- Nicholas Blake (disambiguation), multiple people
- Nickardo Blake (born 1989), Jamaican-American footballer
- Nils Blake, Swedish nobleman
- Noel Blake (born 1962), Jamaican footballer
- Nola Blake, Australian criminal
- Norman Blake (disambiguation), multiple people
- Nyle Blake (born 1999), English footballer

=== O ===
- Olivia Blake (born 1990), British politician
- Oliver Blake (1802–1873), American-born Canadian businessman and political figure
- Olivie Blake (born 1989), American author
- O'Mega Blake (born 2002), American football player

=== P ===
- Pamela Blake (1915–2009), American actress
- Patrick Blake (disambiguation), multiple people
- Paul Blake (disambiguation), multiple people
- Perry Blake (born 1970), Irish singer-songwriter
- Peter Blake (disambiguation), multiple people
- Phil Blake (born 1963), Australian rugby league footballer
- Philip Blake (disambiguation), multiple people
- P. L. Blake (born 1936), Canadian football player

=== Q ===
- Quentin Blake (born 1932), English cartoonist

=== R ===
- Rachael Blake (born 1971), Australian actress
- Ran Blake (born 1935), American pianist
- Randolph Blake (born 1945), American psychologist
- Randy Blake (born 1986), American kickboxer
- Raymond B. Blake, Canadian historian
- Rebecca Blake (born 1998), Romanian cricketer
- Renée A. Blake, American professor
- Richard Blake (disambiguation), multiple people
- Ricky Blake (born 1967), American football player
- Rob Blake (born 1969), Canadian ice hockey player
- Robbie Blake (born 1976), English footballer
- Robert Blake (disambiguation), multiple people
- Robson Blake (born 1995), Welsh rugby union footballer
- Rockwell Blake (born 1951), American operatic tenor
- Rod Blake (born 1952), Australian rules footballer
- Rodney Blake (born 1983), Australian rugby union footballer
- Rodney Blake (basketball) (born 1966), American basketball player
- Roger Blake (born 1957), Welsh actor
- Ronald James Blake (born 1934), English civil engineer
- Ronnie Blake (born 1972), American trumpeter
- Roy Blake (disambiguation), multiple people
- Russell Blake (disambiguation), multiple people
- Ruth Blake, American geophysicist
- Ryan Blake (disambiguation), multiple people

=== S ===
- Samuel Blake (1807–1887), American politician
- Samuel Hume Blake (1835–1914), Canadian politician
- Sarah Blake (disambiguation), multiple people
- Scott Blake (born 1976), American artist
- Seamus Blake (born 1970), British-Canadian saxophonist
- Shanin Blake (born 1994), American pop singer, artist, influencer and model
- Sharon Magness Blake (born 1950), American horse breeder
- Sheriff Blake (1899–1982), American baseball player
- Sian Blake (1972–2016), British actress
- Sidney Fay Blake (1892–1959), American botanist
- Stan Blake (born 1954), American politician
- Stanley Thatcher Blake (1910–1973), Australian botanist
- Stephanie Blake (born 1968), American actress
- Stéphanie Blake (born 1968), American author
- Stephen S. Blake, (1843–1929), Irish-American lawyer
- Steve Blake (born 1980), American basketball player
- Steve Blake, London based disc jockey
- S. Prestley Blake (1914–2021), American businessman
- Susie Blake (born 1950), English actress
- Susy Blake, American politician

=== T ===
- Tamlin Blake (born 1974), South African artist
- Tanya Blake (born 1971), British runner
- Tchad Blake (born 1955), American record producer
- Ted Blake (1921–1998), British inventor
- Thomas Blake (disambiguation), multiple people
- Tia Blake (1952–2015), American singer-songwriter and writer
- Tim Blake (born 1952), English musician
- Timothy Blake, American actress
- Toe Blake (1912–1995), Canadian ice hockey player and coach
- Tom Blake (disambiguation), multiple people
- Tony Blake (disambiguation), multiple people
- Torita Blake (born 1995), Australian athlete
- Tra Blake, American referee
- Trevor Blake (1937–2004), New Zealand cricketer and field hockey player

=== V ===
- Valentine Blake (disambiguation), multiple people
- Valentino Blake (born 1990), American football player
- Val Ffrench Blake (1913–2011), English horse breeder
- Vivian Blake (1956–2010), Jamaican drug dealer
- Vivian Blake (politician) (1921–2000), Jamaican lawyer and politician

=== W ===
- Walter Blake (disambiguation), multiple people
- Waqa Blake (born 1994), Fijian rugby league footballer
- Wesley Blake (born 1987), American wrestler
- Whitney Blake (1926–2002), American actress
- Wilfred Theodore Blake (1894–1968), English aviator
- Will Blake (born 1991), American painter
- William Blake (disambiguation), multiple people
- Winston Blake (1940–2016), Jamaican producer

=== Y ===
- Yohan Blake (born 1989), Jamaican sprinter
- Yve Blake, Australian screenwriter
- Yvonne Blake (1940–2018), British costume designer

=== Z ===
- Zoë Foster Blake (born 1980), Australian author

== Fictional characters ==
- Anita Blake, in the book series Anita Blake: Vampire Hunter
- Daphne Blake, on the television series Scooby-Doo
- Lt. Col. Henry Blake, on the movie, television series, and book series M*A*S*H
- Detective Blake, on the television series Kung Fu: The Legend Continues
- Ellen Blake, a character played by Loni Anderson in the 1984 TV movie My Mother's Secret Life
- Nico Blake, on the soap opera Hollyoaks
- Bellamy and Octavia Blake, on the television series The 100
- Roj Blake of the eponymous television series Blake's Seven
- Sexton Blake, in various British comic series
- Sienna Blake, a character on the soap opera Hollyoaks

== See also ==
- Blake (disambiguation), a disambiguation page for "Blake"
- Admiral Blake (disambiguation), a disambiguation page for Admirals surnamed "Blake"
- Justice Blake (disambiguation), a disambiguation page for Justices surnamed "Blake"
- Governor Blake (disambiguation), a disambiguation page for Governors surnamed "Blake"
- General Blake (disambiguation), a disambiguation page for Generals surnamed "Blake"
- Senator Blake (disambiguation), a disambiguation page for Senators surnamed "Blake"
