= George Blake (disambiguation) =

George Blake (1922–2020) was a former British spy and double agent for the Soviet Union.

George Blake may also refer to:

- George Blagge (sometimes rendered 'Blake') (1512–1551), English courtier, politician, soldier, minor poet
- George Blake (athlete) (1878–1946), Australian Olympic athlete and sportsman
- George Blake (novelist) (1893–1961), Scottish journalist and writer
- George Blake (rugby union) (born 2001), Australian rugby union player
- George A.H. Blake (1810–1884), US Army cavalry officer
- George E. Blake (1774–1871), American music publisher
- George S. Blake (1802–1871), US Navy commodore
- George Stanfield Blake (1876–1940), British mineral and mining geologist
- George Blake, a minor DC Comics character

== Other uses ==
- USC&GS George S. Blake, US oceanographic vessel

== See also ==
- Blake (disambiguation)
- Blake (surname)
