= Robert Blake =

Robert Blake (or variants) may refer to:

== Sports ==
- Bob Blake (American football) (1885–1962), American football player
- Robbie Blake (born 1976), English footballer
- Bob Blake (ice hockey) (1914–2008), American ice hockey player
- Rob Blake (born 1969), Canadian ice hockey player

== Politics ==
- Robert Blake (MP) (1766–1823), English politician
- Robert O. Blake (1921–2015), American diplomat
- Robert O. Blake Jr. (born 1957), American diplomat, son of above

== Military ==
- Robert Blake (admiral) (1598–1657), English admiral
- Robert Blake (Medal of Honor), American Civil War sailor, first African-American to receive the Medal of Honor
- Robert Blake (USMC) (1894–1983), United States Marine Corps general

== Entertainment ==
- Robert Blake (actor) (1933–2023), American actor, starred in the TV series Baretta
- Robert Blake (folk singer) (fl. 21st century), American folk singer
- Bobby Blake (born 1957), American pornographic actor turned Baptist elder

== Other ==
- Robert Blake (cabinetmaker) (fl. 1826–1839), London cabinetmaker
- Robert Blake (dentist) (1772–1822), Irish dentist
- Robert Blake, Baron Blake (1916–2003), English historian
- Robert Pierpont Blake (1886–1950), American Byzantist and Orientalist
- Robert R. Blake (1918–2004), American management theoretician, developer of the Managerial Grid Model
- Robert Blake, brother of poet William Blake (1757–1827), who William claimed visited him in his dreams

== In fiction ==
- Robert Blake (detective), a fictional detective character created by novelist Dinendra Kumar Roy
- Bob Blake, in a series of African-American westerns from the 1930s played by Herb Jeffries
- Robert Blake, from Bungie' computer game Marathon 2: Durandal
- Robert Harrison Blake, from H. P. Lovecraft's short story "The Haunter of the Dark"

== See also ==
- Blake (disambiguation)
