= Schwellenbach =

Schwellenbach is a surname. Notable people with the surname include:

- Edgar W. Schwellenbach (1887–1957), American judge from the state of Washington, brother of Lewis
- Lewis B. Schwellenbach (1894–1948), American politician and judge from the state of Washington, brother of Edgar
- Spencer Schwellenbach (born 2000), American baseball player
