= Nicholas Blake (disambiguation) =

Nicholas Blake was a pen name used by British poet Cecil Day-Lewis (1904–1972).

Nicholas Blake may also refer to:

- Nicholas Blake (Dominican) (fl. 1698–1702), Irish poet
- Nicholas Blake (judge) (born 1949), judge of the High Court of England and Wales
- Nicholas Blake (Spooks), a fictional character

== See also ==
- Blake (surname)
- Blake (disambiguation)
