= Anthony Blake =

Anthony Blake may refer to:

- Anthony Blake (bishop) (c. 1704–1787), Archbishop of Armagh, 1758–1786
- Anthony Richard Blake (1786–1849), Irish lawyer, administrator and 'backstairs Viceroy of Ireland'
- The protagonist of The Magician, who was played by Bill Bixby
- Anthony Blake, Baronet (1951–2014), of the Blake baronets
- Anthony Blake, Glennfiddich Award-winning food photographer

== See also ==
- Blake (surname)
- Tony Blake (disambiguation)
