= Dominick Edward Blake =

Dominick Edward Blake may refer to:

- Dominick Edward Blake (1833–1912), Premier of Ontario, Canada, 1871–1872, MP for South Longford 1892–1907
- Dominick Edward Blake (clergyman) (1806–1859), Church of England clergyman in Upper Canada
