= Patrick Blake =

Patrick Blake may refer to:

- Patrick Blake (Canadian politician) (1846–1909), businessman and politician in Prince Edward Island, Canada
- Sir Patrick Blake, 1st Baronet (c. 1742–1784), MP for Sudbury
- Sir Patrick Blake, 2nd Baronet (c. 1768–1818), of the Blake baronets
- Sir Patrick Blake, 5th Baronet (1861–1930), of the Blake baronets
- Patrick Blake (Hollyoaks), a fictional character from the teen soap opera, Hollyoaks

== See also ==
- Blake (surname)
