= Maurice Blake =

Maurice Blake may refer to:

- Maurice Carey Blake (1815–1897), American politician
- Maurice Blake (philatelist) (1888–1969), American philatelist
