= Brian Blake (disambiguation) =

Brian Blake (born 1960) is an American logger, forester, and politician.

Brian Blake may also refer to:

== Other people ==
- M. Brian Blake (born 1971), American computer scientist
- Brian Blake (darts player), see Houston Open (darts)
- Brian Blake, drummer for Real Friends

== Fictional characters ==
- The Governor (The Walking Dead), fictional given name Brian Blake
- Brian Blake, character in Enemy of the State
