= Walter Blake =

Walter Blake may refer to:

- Walter Blake (politician) (died 1748), Irish aristocrat and politician
- Walter Blake (bishop) (died 1758), Irish bishop of Achonry
- Sir Walter Blake, 10th Baronet (died 1802) of the Blake baronets

== See also ==
- Walter Blake fitz John (died 1508), Irish bishop of Clonmacnoise
- Blake (surname)
