= General Blake =

General Blake may refer to:

- David Blake (general) (1887–1965), Australian Army major general
- Gordon Blake (1910–1997), U.S. Air Force lieutenant general
- Harold Henry Blake (1883–1960), British Army major general
- Joaquín Blake (1759–1827), Spanish Army captain general
- Robert Blake (admiral) (1598–1657), Commonwealth Navy General at Sea
- Robert Blake (USMC) (1894–1983), U.S. Marine Corps major general
