= Dominick Blake =

Dominick Blake may refer to:

- Dominick Blake (priest) (1806–1859), Irish-born Church of England priest in Upper Canada
- Dominick Edward Blake (1833–1912), premier of Ontario

== See also ==
- Dominique Blake (born 1987), Jamaican track and field athlete
