= Justice Blake =

Justice Blake may refer to:

- Bruce Blake (judge) (1881–1957), associate justice of the Washington Supreme Court
- Henry N. Blake (1838–1935), associate justice of the Montana Supreme Court
- Vivian Blake (politician) (1921–2000), chief justice of the Bahamas
