= Nicholas Jones (actor) =

English actor (born 1946)

- Born: 3 April 1946 (age 80); London, England
- Occupation: Actor
- Years active: 1969–present
- Parent: Griffith Jones
- Relatives: Gemma Jones (sister)

Nicholas Jones (born 3 April 1946) is an English actor who has appeared on stage and in film and television.

== Early life ==
Jones was born in London, the younger brother of actress Gemma Jones. They are the children of actor Griffith Jones (1909–2007) and Robin Isaac. He was educated at Westminster School.

== Career ==
Jones has played leads on television, at the Royal National Theatre, and on the West End Stage. He also appeared with the Royal Shakespeare Company (1999), and has starred at Shakespeare's Globe.

== Filmography ==
=== Film ===
- The Corpse (1971) – Benjy Smith
- Wolfshead: The Legend of Robin Hood (1973) – Squire
- The Blockhouse (1973) – Kramer
- Daisy Miller (1974) – Charles
- When the Whales Came (1989) – Vicar
- This Year's Love (1999) – James
- On Wings of Fire (2001)
- And Now... Ladies and Gentlemen (2002) – London Jeweller
- Vanity Fair (2004) – Lord Darlington
- Vera Drake (2004) – Defence Barrister
- Copying Beethoven (2006) – Archduke Rudolph
- Surveillance (2007) – Lord Raven (Jake's Father)
- Flawless (2007) – Jameson
- The Lady (2011) – Robert Gordon, UK Ambassador (1995–1999)
- The Iron Lady (2011) – Admiral Sir Henry Leach
- The Best of Men (2012) - Major-General Harold Henry Blake
- Philomena (2013) – Dr. Robert
- Mr Turner (2014) – Sir John Soane
- Effie Gray (2014) – Doctor Lee
- In the Heart of the Sea (2015) – Pollard Senior
- War Machine (2017) – Dick Waddle
- Darkest Hour (2017) – Sir John Simon
- The Children Act (2017) – Professor Rodney Carter

=== Television ===
Since 1969, Jones has acted in over 90 television films and series.

In the 1970s, he starred as Captain Triggers in the First World War series Wings. He also played Jeremy Aldermarten QC in all six series of the 1990s courtroom drama Kavanagh QC.

Jones' many appearances include the following:

- Not a Penny More, Not a Penny Less (1990, TV Movie) – Dr. Robin Oakley
- A Dangerous Man: Lawrence After Arabia (1992, TV Movie) – Lord Dyson
- Unnatural Causes (1993, TV Movie) – Luker
- Lipstick on Your Collar (1993) – Major Carter
- Sharpe's Company (1994, TV Movie) – Col. Fletcher
- Bramwell (1995) – Lord Edward Carstairs
- A Touch of Frost (1996) – Major Harvey
- The Beggar Bride (1997) – Sir Fabian Ormerod
- A Dance to the Music of Time (1997) – Bob Duport
- Hornblower: Mutiny (2002) – Lieutenant Buckland
- Hornblower: Retribution (2002) – Lieutenant Buckland
- The Alan Clark Diaries (2004) – Peter Morrison, MP
- Sensitive Skin (2005)
- Dunkirk (2005) – Major Angus McCorquodale
- New Tricks (2005) – Michaela Pendle
- Inspector George Gently (2006) – Henry Blythely
- Silent Witness (2006) – Dr Harvey Wilson
- Eleventh Hour (2006) – Dr Sidney Hayward
- Spooks (2006) – Michael Collingwood
- Rebus (2007, Series 4, Episode 3) – Commander Steelforth
- Little Dorrit (2008) – The Scary Butler
- Margaret (2009) – Tim Renton, MP
- Midsomer Murders (2010–2014) – Ernest Bradley / Reverend Moreland
- The Shadow Line (2011) – Commander Penney
- Waking the Dead (2011) – Leo Harding
- Silk (2012) – Judge Goodbrand
- The Hollow Crown (2012) – Archbishop of York
- Holby City (2012) – Jeremy Hamilton
- Henry IV, Part II (2012) – the Archbishop of York
- Twenty Twelve (2012) – Tony Griffiths
- The Best of Men (2012) – Major-General Harold Henry Blake
- The Suspicions of Mr Whicher (2014) – Sir Edwards Shore
- Law & Order: UK (2014) – Edmund Rintoul
- Father Brown (2014) – Colonel Cecil Gerard
- Arthur & George (2015) – Judge Atkins
- Lewis (2015) – Philip Hathaway
- Mid Morning Matters with Alan Partridge (2016) – Cecil Croom-Phillips
- The Crown (2016) – Charles Wilson
- Count Arthur Strong (2017) – Judge
- The Moorside (2017) – Judge
- Absentia (2017) – Irving
- Pennyworth (2019) – Sir Francis Tewkes
- House of the Dragon (2022–2026) – Bartimos Celtigar (10 episodes)
- Professor T. (2025) - Peter Snares
