= The Best of Men =

2012 British television film

- Genre: Drama
- Written by: Lucy Gannon
- Directed by: Tim Whitby
- Starring: Eddie Marsan; Rob Brydon

Production
- Producer: Harriet Davison
- Cinematography: Matt Gray BSC
- Editor: David Thrasher
- Running time: 90 minutes

Original release
- Network: BBC Two
- Release: 16 August 2012

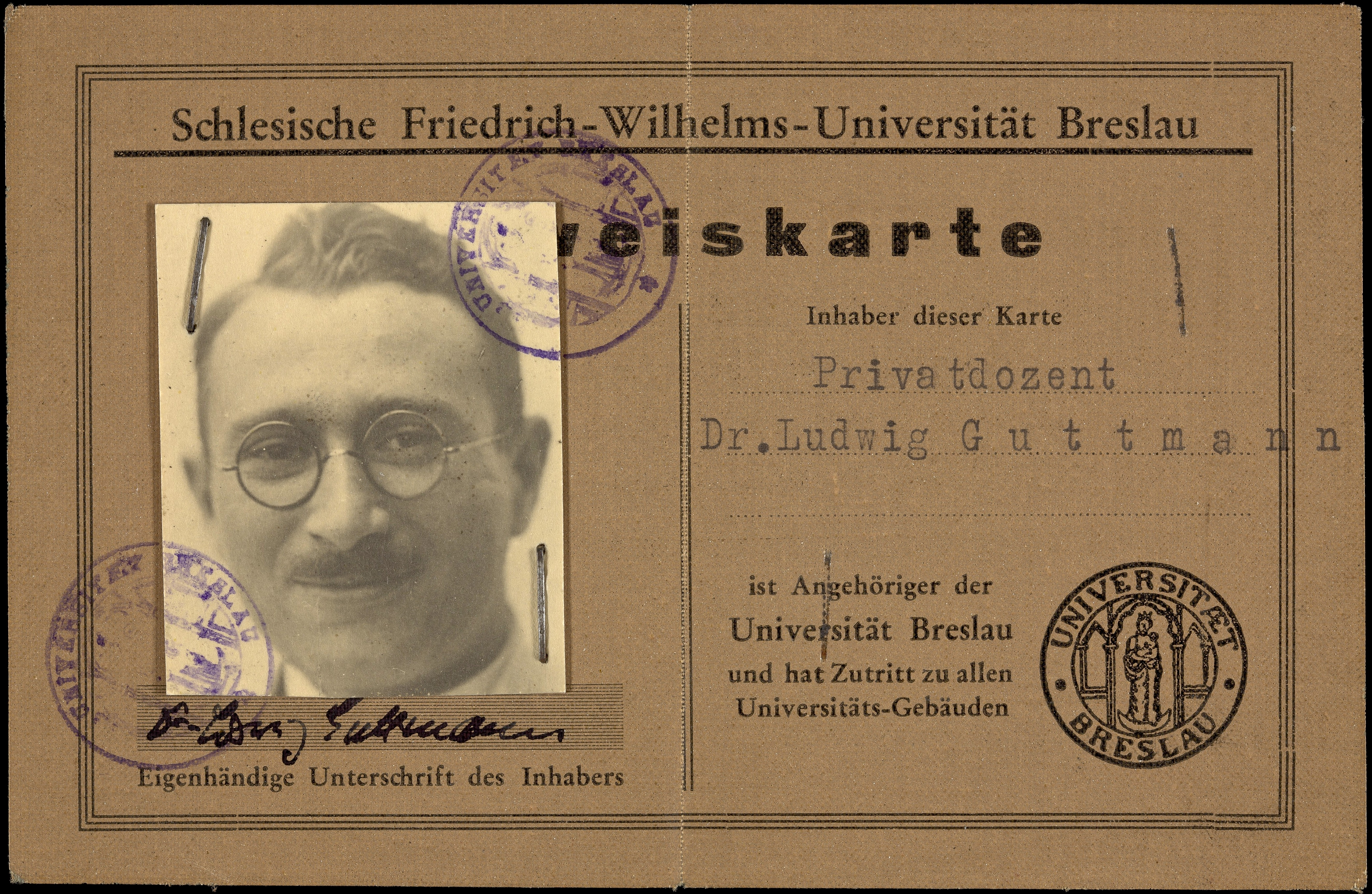
Identity card of Guttman, Schlesische Friedrich-Wilhelms-Universität Breslau

The Best of Men is a 2012 period drama television film, which dramatizes the pioneering work of Dr Ludwig Guttmann with paraplegic patients at Stoke Mandeville Hospital, which led to the foundation of the Paralympic Games. It stars Eddie Marsan and Rob Brydon, and aired on BBC Two.

== Plot ==
Ludwig Guttmann (Marsan) is a Jewish refugee from Nazi Germany, sponsored to stay in the United Kingdom by CARA, while his patients were injured British servicemen, initially bewildered at finding themselves under the care of one of "the enemy".

On arrival at the hospital, the patients are kept under sedation, and immobile in bed, a regime leading to bedsores, infection, and, in many cases, death. Dr Guttman insists that the best prognosis for the patients is if they are as mobile as possible. This leads him to clash with the existing staff of nurses and doctors at the hospital, who are accustomed to merely managing the decline of their patients.

As he gradually wins the staff over with his determination and optimism, Guttmann faces a further problem in the hopelessness of some of the patients, particularly exemplified by the youngest inmate, William Heath (MacKay), who joined the army from school. William's despair is contrasted with the irrepressible humour of veteran Wynn Bowen (Brydon), who offers a constant stream of irreverent comments from his bed.

Guttman hits on competitive exercise and sport as a way of both encouraging physical exercise and building self-esteem. Now in wheelchairs, the patients compete at hockey and basketball, and begin to re-connect to the outside world. The patients visit a local pub and challenge the regulars to arm-wrestling. The previously suicidal William engages in sport so enthusiastically that he breaks a leg, to the consternation of the other medical staff. Wynn is scheduled for a reunion with his wife in Wales, although this makes his composure crack over worries about his sexual performance. After Dr Guttman tells him "there is more than one way to skin a cat", he returns, jubilantly proclaiming that he "skinned the cat!".

Guttmann organises a national disability sport competition, the first Stoke Mandeville Games, in the hospital grounds. The film closes with captions describing how these developed into the Paralympics, and how Dr Guttmann was awarded a knighthood.

== Cast ==
- Dr Ludwig Guttmann - Eddie Marsan
- Private William Heath - George Mackay
- Cpl Wynne Bowen - Rob Brydon
- Sister Edwards - Niamh Cusack
- Dr Cowan - Richard McCabe
- Major-General Harold Henry Blake - Nicholas Jones
- Sgt "Q" Hills, PTI Instructor - Tristan Sturrock
- Mr Heath - Nigel Lindsay
- Mrs Heath - Rachael Spence
- Nurse Carr - Leigh Quinn

== Production ==
Written by Lucy Gannon, the show was produced by Whitby Davison for the BBC. The majority of the filming took place at three halls of residence in the University of Bristol: Wills Hall, Goldney Hall and Manor Hall.

== Reception ==
Lucy Mangan of The Guardian praised the acting, and saying the film 'heart' and 'soul'. Patrick Smith of The Daily Telegraph called it 'rousing, wholesome and upbeat'.

=== Awards ===
The film won the Philadelphia Jewish Film Festival 34 Best Narrative Audience Award.
