= Richard Blake =

Richard Blake may refer to:

- Richard Blake (16th century), mayor of Galway, 1533–1534
- Richard Blake (17th century), mayor of Galway, fl. 1647
- Richard Blake Brown (1902–1968), British priest and author
- Richard H. Blake (born 1975), American musical actor
- Richard Blake, namesake of the Blake Transit Center in Ann Arbor, Michigan
