= Larry Blake =

Larry Blake may refer to:

- Larry Blake (hurler) (1909–1957), Irish left wing-back for Clare
- Larry J. Blake (1914–1982), also known as Larry Blake, American vaudevillian in film and television

== See also ==
- Laurie Blake, American comics superheroine in 2019 TV series Watchmen
