= Ernest Blake =

Ernest Blake may refer to:

- Ernest Blake (water polo) (1912–2002), British water polo player
- Ernest Blake (footballer) (1895–1965), English footballer
- Ernest Edward Blake (1845–1920), British colonial official
