= Thomas Blake =

Thomas Blake may refer to:

- Thomas Blake (minister) (c. 1597–1657), English clergyman and controversialist
- Thomas Blake (tennis) (born 1976), American professional tennis player
- Thomas Blake (MP) (1825–1901), British politician
- Thomas Blake (cricketer) (1805–1895), English cricketer
- Catman's alter-ego, Thomas Blake
- Tom Blake (surfer) (1902–1994), American surfer and inventor
- Thomas H. Blake (1792–1849), U.S. Representative from Indiana
- Sir Thomas Blake, 2nd Baronet (died 1642)
- Thomas Blake Glover (1838–1911), Scottish merchant associated with Japan
- Thomas Blake, mayor of Galway, 1495–1496

== See also ==
- Blake baronets
- Blake (surname)
