= Admiral Blake (disambiguation) =

Robert Blake (admiral) (1598–1657) was an English general at sea, modernly reported as an admiral. Admiral Blake may also refer to:

- Geoffrey Blake (Royal Navy officer) (1882–1968), British Royal Navy vice admiral
- George S. Blake (1802–1871), U.S. Navy commodore, equivalent rank to an admiral
- Homer C. Blake (1822–1880), U.S. Navy commodore, equivalent rank to an admiral
