= Michael Blake =

Michael Blake may refer to:

- Michael Blake (author) (1945–2015), American author, best known for his film adaptation of his novel Dances with Wolves
- Michael Blake (bishop) (1775–1860), Irish Roman Catholic bishop of Dromore
- Michael Blake (composer) (born 1951), South African contemporary classical music composer
- Michael Blake (musician) (born 1964), Canadian musician
- Michael Blake (politician) (born 1982), New York Assembly member
- Michael Blake (rugby league) (born 1961), Australian former rugby league footballer
- Michael F. Blake (1857–1929), judge in New York City
- Mick Blake (1874–1931), Australian rules footballer
- Mike Blake, character in Alabama Moon

== See also ==
- Blake (surname)
- Blake Michael (born 1996), American actor
