= Arthur Blake =

Arthur Blake may refer to:

- Arthur Blake (American actor) (1914–1985), American actor
- Arthur Blake (English actor) (1929–2001), English actor
- Arthur Blake (hurdler) (born 1966), American hurdler
- Arthur Blake (distance runner) (1872–1944), American middle-distance runner
- Arthur Blake (Royal Navy officer) (1917–1940), British flying ace of the Second World War
- Blind Blake (Arthur Blake, 1896–1934), American blues/ragtime singer and guitarist

== See also ==
- Henry Arthur Blake (1840–1918), British colonial administrator, governor of Hong Kong
