= Joseph Blake =

Joseph Blake is the name of:

- Joseph Blake (governor) (died 1700), English colonial administrator; governor of South Carolina
- Joseph Blake (criminal) (1700–1724), English executed highwayman remembered in "Blueskin's Ballad" and other works
- Joseph Blake, 1st Baron Wallscourt (1765–1803), Irish politician
- Joseph Blake, 3rd Baron Wallscourt (1797–1849), Irish nobleman and propagator of socialist philosophy, nephew of the above
- Joseph Henry Blake (chess player) (1859–1951), English chess grandmaster
- Joe Blake (1882–1931), English footballer

== See also ==
- Blake (surname)
