= Francis Blake =

Francis or Frank Blake may refer to:

== Nobility ==
- Sir Francis Blake, 1st Baronet, of Twizell Castle (1709–1780), Northumbrian landowner
- Sir Francis Blake, 2nd Baronet, of Twizell Castle (c. 1737–1818), Northumbrian landowner and political writer
- Sir Francis Blake, 3rd Baronet, of Twizell Castle (c. 1774–1860), Northumbrian landowner and politician
- Sir Francis Blake, 1st Baronet, of Tillmouth Park (1856–1940), Member of Parliament
- Sir Francis Blake, 2nd Baronet, of Tillmouth Park (1893–1950)

== Science and medicine ==
- Francis Blake (inventor) (1850–1913), American engineer who improved the carbon microphone for telephone use
- Francis Claude Blake (1867–1954), British engineer
- Francis Gilman Blake (1887–1952), American immunologist

== Others ==
- Sir Francis Blake (1638–1718), Member of Parliament for Berwick-Upon-Tweed 1698–1701
- Frank Blake (American football) (fl. 1907–1909), American football coach
- Frank Blake (baseball) (1910–?), American baseball player
- Frank Blake (businessman) (born 1949), American businessman
- Frank Blake (actor), Irish actor
- Francis Blake, character from the comic series Blake and Mortimer

== See also ==
- Blake (surname)
