= Valentine Blake (disambiguation) =

Valentine Blake (1560–1635) was an Irish merchant and Mayor of Galway.

Valentine Blake may also refer to:

- Sir Valentine Blake, 3rd Baronet (died 1652)
- Sir Valentine Blake, 5th Baronet (died c. 1672), of the Blake baronets
- Sir Valentine Blake, 12th Baronet (1780-1847), MP for Galway Borough, of the Blake baronets
- Sir Valentine Blake, 14th Baronet (1836–1912), of the Blake baronets

== See also ==
- Blake (surname)
