= William Blake (disambiguation) =

William Blake (1757–1827) was an English poet, visionary, painter, and printmaker.

William Blake may also refer to:

- William Blake (merchant) (d.1696), philanthropist who founded the Ladies Charity School, Highgate
- William Blake (economist) (1774–1852), English writer on monetary policy and government expenditure
- William Blake (outlaw) (1859–1895), outlaw of the Old West, and member of the Wild Bunch gang
- William Hume Blake (1809–1870), Canadian jurist and politician
- William J. Blake (1894–1968), American writer and husband of Christina Stead
- William O. Blake (1810–1865), American historian; also used pseudonym Thomas H. Prescott
- William Phipps Blake (1826–1910), American mineralogist and geologist
- William Rufus Blake (1805–1863), stage actor
- William Blake (died 1630), MP for Heytesbury
- William John Blake (1805–1875), British Whig politician
- William Blake, a character in Dead Man

== See also ==
- The William Blakes, Danish pop rock band
- William Blake Herron, an American film screenwriter, director and actor
- William Blake Richmond (1842–1921), an English painter and decorator
- William Blake Everett (1917–1973), an American comic book writer and artist
- Will Blake (born 1991), American painter
