= Sarah Blake =

Sarah Blake may refer to:

- Sarah Blake (novelist), American author of Postmistress
- Sarah Blake (poet) (born 1984), American poet and author of the novel Naamah
- Sarah Blake (silversmith), 19th-century English silversmith
