= Anna Blake =

Anna Blake may refer to:

- Anna Blake (Hollyoaks), a fictional character in the soap opera
- Anna S.C. Blake (1844–1899), founder of a school in Santa Barbara, California
- Anna Blake Mezquida (1883–1965), American writer and poet
- Anna-Sharé Blake (born 1991), known professionally as Sevana, Jamaican singer
- Anna Blake, fictional character from the Scooby-Doo video-games; Scooby-Doo! First Frights and Scooby-Doo! and the Spooky Swamp
