= Peter Blake =

Peter Blake may refer to:

- Peter Blake (cricketer) (1927–2011), English cricketer
- Peter Blake (artist) (born 1932), British pop artist
- Peter Blake (sailor) (1948–2001), New Zealand yachtsman
- Peter Blake (actor) (1948–2018), Scottish-born actor
- Peter A. Blake (born 1957), American public administrator
- Peter Blake (writer), co-executive producer of the television series House
- Peter Blake (Days of Our Lives), a character in the American soap opera Days of Our Lives
