= Roy Blake =

Roy Blake may refer to:

- Roy Blake Jr. (born 1956), American politician
- Roy Blake Sr. (1928–2017), American politician
- Roy William Blake (1906–1994), Canadian diplomat
