= Richard Blake Brown =

British writer (1902–1968)

The Reverend Richard Blake Brown
- Born: 14 January 1902; Melrose, Massachusetts, United States
- Died: 3 November 1968 (aged 66); Clifton, Bristol, England
- Education: Magdalene College, Cambridge
- Writing career
- Period: 1920s–1960s

Richard Blake Brown (4 January 1902 – 3 November 1968) was a British clergyman, writer, actor, and published author, particularly known for openly writing about homosexuality in his novels, plays, poetry, travel writing, and memoirs.

== Early life and education ==
Brown was born in Melrose, Massachusetts in Greater Boston on 4 January 1902, to Harold Gilbert Brown and Lillian Studley Knight. Shortly after his birth, his father, of English ancestry, moved with his family to England in 1902 due to his work in developing a system of power-signalling for the London Underground. Brown attended Tonbridge School and Berkhamsted School. In 1923, he took a BA from Magdalene College, Cambridge. After graduation he joined The Old Vic as a student actor. After some time he left the theatre and commenced theological studies at St Stephen's House, Oxford. He graduated, and was ordained priest in December 1927 by the Bishop of Portsmouth Neville Lovett.

== Clerical career ==
Upon ordination, Brown was appointed curate at St Mary's Church, Portsea, where he assisted, together with other curates, the vicar Geoffrey Lunt. In March 1928, he wrote to Bishop Lovett expressing his lugubrious mood at St Mary's, noting that the post would not "produce in me the happy and spontaneous zeal and enthusiasm which I could feel in fresh surroundings.". Despite the letter, where he remarked that he was offered a curacy at St Mary's Church in Speldhurst which he was eager to accept, Brown remained in Portsea for a further three years. In 1929, he resigned his holy orders due to his perception on the decline in the church's influence on people. He then focused more on his writings. Nonetheless, he returned to his ordained ministry in 1933 and served in St James' Church, Staveley, while in 1939 he moved to Sidmouth and ministered at the local parish church. In March 1941, he joined the Royal Naval Reserve. He became chaplain in HMS Renown when she was ordered to search for the German battleship Bismarck. Until June 1968, he was prison chaplain at Horfield Prison. During those years he managed to become well-liked by both prisoners and staff and was described as the "prisoners’ friend". He had to relinquish his duties at the prison in January 1968 due to poor health and officially retired in June of that year. In October 1941, he announced his engagement to Bridget Lilias Margaret Hancock.

== Death ==
Brown lived in Carters Building in Portland Street, Clifton, Bristol. Towards the end of his life he was quite ill and suffered from diabetes. On 3 November 1968 he was found unconscious on his smoke-filled bedroom floor after a fire had started as a result of an electric heater which had tilted over. Efforts were made to revive him, however he died of Asphyxia at the Bristol Royal Infirmary.

Brown was buried in an unmarked grave in the St Mary's, Redcliffe, cemetery in Brislington. His funeral was conducted by Bishop of Bristol Oliver Tompkins with eulogy read by Bishop of Southwark Mervyn Stockwood.

== Writer ==
Brown was the author of a significant amount of literature, some of which was published. Notably, 14 of his novels were published between 1931 and 1959. Some of his unpublished work also includes plays, poetry, travel journals, non-fiction, and short stories. He has also been described as a "Firbankian" novelist, due to the potential influence from the works of Ronald Firbank.

=== Published books ===
- Miss Higgs and her Silver Flamingo (1931)
- Yellow Brimstone (1931)
- The Apology of a Young Ex-Parson (1932) [journals]
- A Broth of a Boy (1934)
- The Blank Cheque (1934)
- Joy in Jeopardy (1935)
- Rococo Coffin (1936)
- My Aunt in Pink (1936)
- Spinsters, Awake! (1937)
- Bicycle Belle (1937)
- God by Lamplight (1938) [theological essay]
- Mr. Prune on Cotswold (1938) [travel book]
- Yet Trouble Came (1957)
- Bright Glades (1959)

== Sexuality ==
Ahead of his time, Brown was quite open about his homosexuality in his writings, notably his autobiographical works. Brown kept a diary where he recounts how in 1927 he discussed homosexual sex with his father and how he confessed everything to his father concerning his sexuality. It was noted that he stored his diaries in a locked chest, within another locked chest.
