= Anna S. C. Blake =

American educator (1844–1899)

Anna S.C. Blake
- Born: 1844; Boston, Massachusetts, U.S.
- Died: 1899 (aged 54–55); Santa Barbara, California, U.S.
- Occupation: Founder of Santa Barbara Sloyd School

Anna S.C. Blake (1844 – (?) 1899) was the wealthy founder of the Santa Barbara Sloyd School in 1892 in Santa Barbara, California. The school was renamed after her death into Anna Blake Manual Training School.

== Biography ==
Anna Blake was the eldest daughter of George B. Blake, founder of a bank. Besides founding a school, Anna Blake left her home, which was built in 1886, into a refuge for the ill and miserable. The home, on Santa Barbara street and Constance avenue was turned into the Miradero Sanitarium in Santa Barbara.

== School ==
The school originally had kindergarten education. Older girl students got an education in cooking and needlework; boys were educated in carpentry. The school later changed in a state normal school. In 1944 it became part of the University of California, Santa Barbara.

Blake, who modeled her curriculum after the sloyd method, would ultimately rely on her neighbor, Ednah Rich, to run the school after sending Rich to study the sloyd method in Boston, Sweden, and Germany. Rich would become principal of the school in 1896. In May 1898, Blake, nearing the end of her life, deeded the school to the city of Santa Barbara, California as part of the Santa Barbara public schooling system. The deed was officially transferred on July 1, 1899, just months after Blake's death.
