= Martin Blake =

Martin Blake may refer to:

- Martin Blake (clergyman) (1593–1673), English bishop
- Martin J. Blake (1853–1930), Irish historian
- Martin Joseph Blake (1790–1861), Irish politician
