= Arthur Blake (Royal Navy officer) =

British flying ace of the Second World War (1917–1940)

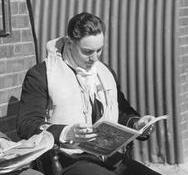
- Blake in 1940
- Born: 16 September 1917; Gateshead, England
- Died: 29 October 1940 (aged 23); Chelmsford, England
- Military career
- Allegiance: United Kingdom
- Branch: Royal Navy: Fleet Air Arm
- Rank: Sub-lieutenant
- Nicknames: 'Admiral' 'Sailor'
- Unit: No. 19 Squadron
- Conflicts: Second World War: Battle of Britain

Arthur Giles Blake (12 September 1917 – 29 October 1940) was a British flying ace of the Royal Navy (RN) during the Second World War. He was credited with five aerial victories.

Born in Gateshead, Blake joined the RN in early 1939 and was assigned to the Fleet Air Arm for flight training. After the Battle of France, Blake was seconded to the Royal Air Force's Fighter Command due to a shortage of pilots. Posted to No. 19 Squadron as a reinforcement pilot in July, he flew extensively during the Battle of Britain and destroyed a number of German aircraft. He was killed in action two days before the official conclusion of the Battle of Britain.

== Early life ==
One of eight children of John Blake, a sales representative, and his wife Mary, Arthur Giles Blake was born on 12 September 1917 in Gateshead, England. His family subsequently moved to Slough where he was educated. Following the completion of his schooling, Blake worked as a clerk. In 1938, he applied to join the Royal Navy (RN) on a short service commission with a view to becoming a pilot in the Fleet Air Arm (FAA). He was accepted and entered the RN early the following year.

Blake, holding the rank of a midshipman, was first posted to the Royal Naval College at Greenwich. Then, in August he went to No. 20 Elementary Flying Training school, a Royal Air Force (RAF) facility at Gravesend, where he learnt to fly de Havilland Tiger Moth trainers. The following month he was promoted to acting sub-lieutenant.

== Second World War ==
In November 1939, and with the Second World War well under way, Blake proceeded to No. 1 Flying Training School at Netheravon. Here he flew the more advanced North American Harvard trainer before switching to the Fairey Battle, a light bomber. He gained his wings in March 1940, and the same month was confirmed as a sub-lieutenant. Further training followed, this time on the Blackburn Skua, designed as a carrier-borne fighter and dive bomber.

=== Battle of Britain ===
Following the Battle of France, RAF's Fighter Command had lost many of its pilots and was in need of urgent replacements to shore up the aerial defences of the United Kingdom. To help with this shortfall, in June the Admiralty seconded over fifty of its FAA pilots, Blake among them, to Fighter Command. Before being posted to a fighter squadron, he went to No. 7 Operational Training Unit to become familiar with the Supermarine Spitfire fighter. In July he was assigned to No. 19 Squadron, where he would have the nicknames 'Admiral' and 'Sailor'. He stood out from the RAF pilots on account of his dark blue naval uniform. His new unit operated Spitfires from Duxford as part of No. 12 Group, carrying out convoy patrols over the North Sea.

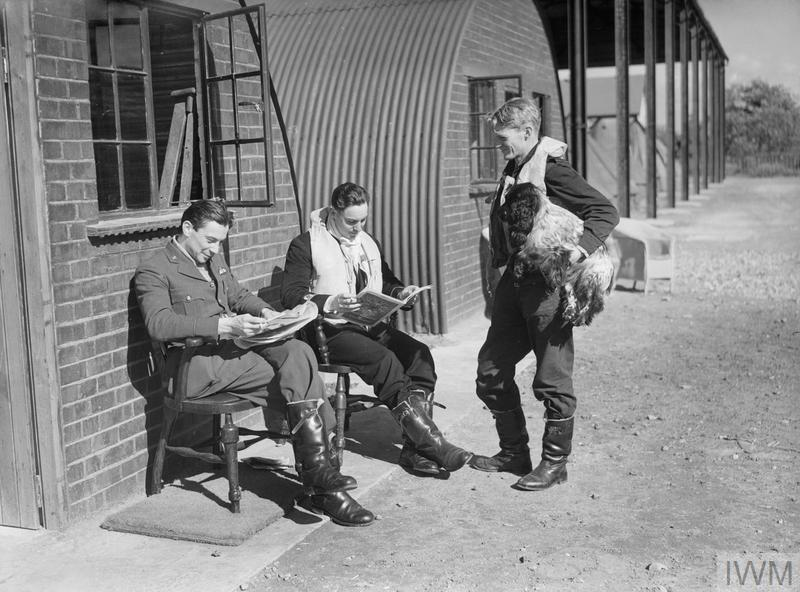
Blake, at centre, relaxes with other pilots at Fowlmere, September 1940

Blake's first few weeks with the squadron were quiet and his first engagement with the Luftwaffe was not until 25 August, when his squadron and two others engaged a fleet of aircraft over the Thames estuary. As the Battle of Britain escalated, No. 19 Squadron became drawn into the aerial fighting over London. However, its effectiveness was hampered by faults with the cannon armament being trialed in its aircraft and at the start of September it reverted to Spitfires fitted with machine guns. On 3 September Blake damaged a Messerschmitt Bf 110 heavy fighter south of Colchester on 3 September and six days later shot down a Heinkel He 111 medium bomber over London.

On 15 September, later known as Battle of Britain Day, the Luftwaffe mounted two large scale bombing attacks on London. No. 19 Squadron was one of five squadrons scrambled in the morning as part of the Duxford Wing, the first time this many fighters had been used in a 'Big Wing' formation. The Duxford Wing was scrambled again in the afternoon but was still climbing when it was engaged by several Messerschmitt Bf 109 fighters protecting the attacking bombers. Squadron Leader Douglas Bader, commanding the wing, ordered No. 19 Squadron to seek out the bombers while he led the three Hawker Hurricane fighter squadrons in engaging the Bf 109s. During the course of the day, Blake damaged a Dornier Do 17 medium bomber, destroyed a Bf 109, and with three other pilots, shared in the destruction of a He 111, all over London. His Spitfire damaged, he crash-landed following the afternoon scramble but without injury.

On 17 September, while flying a sortie over Canterbury, Blake destroyed two Bf 109s. Flying at the rear of No. 19 Squadron while on a sortie on 29 October, two days before the end of the Battle of Britain, Blake was attacked by Bf 109s. Unseen by the rest of the squadron, he was killed when his Spitfire crashed near Chelmsford in Essex. He was one of seven FAA pilots to lose their lives in the Battle of Britain.

Blake is credited with having shot down five German aircraft, one being shared with three other pilots, and damaging two others. He is buried at Langley, near Slough, in the churchyard at St Mary's Church.
