= Jennifer Blake =

Jennifer Blake may refer to:

- Jennifer Blake (author), pseudonym used by American romantic novelist Patricia Maxwell (born 1942)
- Jennifer Blake (wrestler) (born 1983), Canadian wrestler
- Jennifer R. Blake, American actress
- Jennifer Blake, pseudonym of Dieter Bohlen (born 1954), German producer and ex-member of Modern Talking
