= Andrew Blake =

Andrew Blake may refer to:

- Andrew Blake (computer scientist) (born 1956), British computer scientist
- Andrew Blake (director) (born 1948), American adult film director
- Andrew Blake (footballer) (born 1996), New Zealand footballer
- Andy Blake series of books by Edward Edson Lee
- Andrew Blake (MP), in 1413 and 1419, MP for Lewes (UK Parliament constituency)
