= Tamlin Blake =

South African mixed media artist

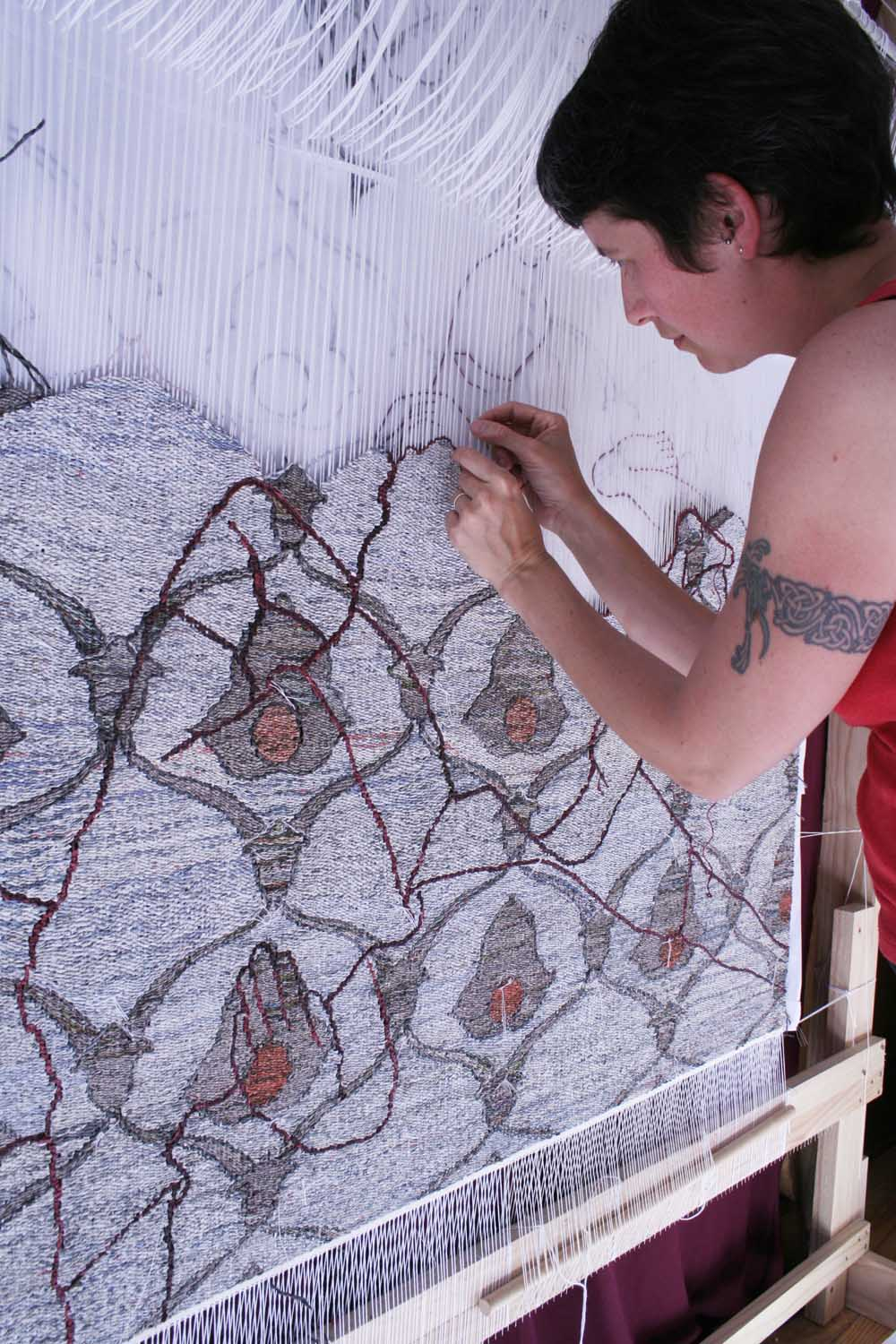
- Tamlin Blake at work in 2009
- Born: 1974 (age 51–52); Johannesburg
- Website: tamlinblake.com

Tamlin Blake (born 1974) is a South African mixed media artist living and working in Riebeeck West. The major themes of Blake's work revolve around cross-cultural South African symbols of wealth and status and, more recently, what constitutes and underpins each individuals sense of belonging. Her sculptural pieces often transcend boundaries between illustration, craft, and art, using weaving, beading, and drawing, amongst other media.

The main body of Blake's beaded art works took the form of South African stamps finely woven using glass seed beads. “By replicating these original stamps in a traditional craft idiom that has such a strong association with indigenous African cultures, Blake offers a genteel but acerbic reference to [South Africa’s] troubled past.” (Innes 2012: pg20 ISBN 978-0-620-52880-1).

While working on her own bead art Blake helped Jeanetta Blignaut, to establish a bead studio which today exists as the Qubeka Bead Studio, a collaborative owned by the bead artists themselves.

After this Tamlin used a variety of different media including three-dimensional pieces in felt and beads to explore the use of farm animals as valued commodities and symbols of wealth and status across the boundaries of race and culture.

Blake's more recent work consists of tapestries woven out of recycled and hand-spun newspaper a collection of which were bought by The Spier Holdings Contemporary Art Collection

== Career ==
=== Education ===
Blake received a master's degree in Fine Art from the University of Stellenbosch in 2001. Blake majored in sculpture during her undergraduate studies, and then specialised in botanical art.

=== Select group exhibitions ===
- Brett Kebble Art Awards, Merit Award, Cape Town (2003)
- Synergy, exhibition of contemporary bead art at Iziko Michaelis Collection, Cape Town (2005–2006)
- South African Art: Signs, Danubiana Meulensteen Art Museum in Bratislava (2007)
- Skin-toSkin: Challenging Textile Art, Kaunas Art Biennial TEXTILE 07 in Lithuania (2007)
- Spier Contemporary Exhibition, Cape Town (2007–2008)
- South African Pavilion, World Expo 2010, Shanghai, China (2010)
- Tamlin Blake, presented at the Spier Booth at the FNB Joburg Art Fair (2012)Spier presents Tamlin Blake at the 2012 Joburg Art Fair

=== Collections ===
- Contemporary Collection for The New Hollard House at Villa Arcadia Hollard Insurance
- The Spier Holdings Contemporary Art Collection Spier
- South African Breweries
- Meulensteen Collection, Slovakia
- Nandos (UK) Nandos
- Water Colour Society of Ireland at the University of Limerick (Ireland)
- Hunt Institute for Botanical Documentation, Carnegie Mellon University (USA)
- Queen Victoria Museum and Art Gallery, Tasmania, Australia

== Gallery ==
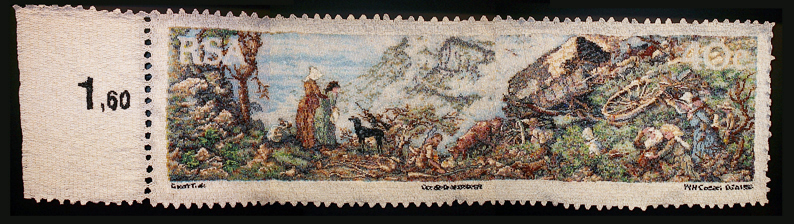
150th Anniversary of the Groot Trek 40c Crossing the Drakensberg

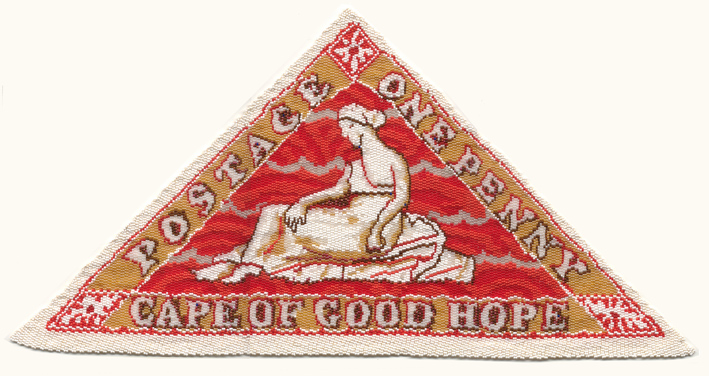
Triangular - 1d deep brick-red - 1853

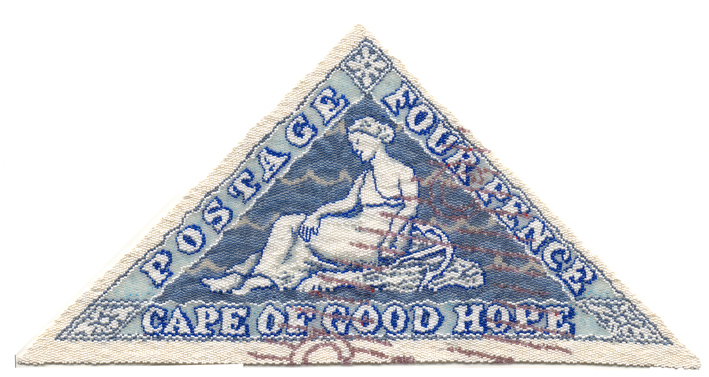
Triangular - 4d deep blue - 1853

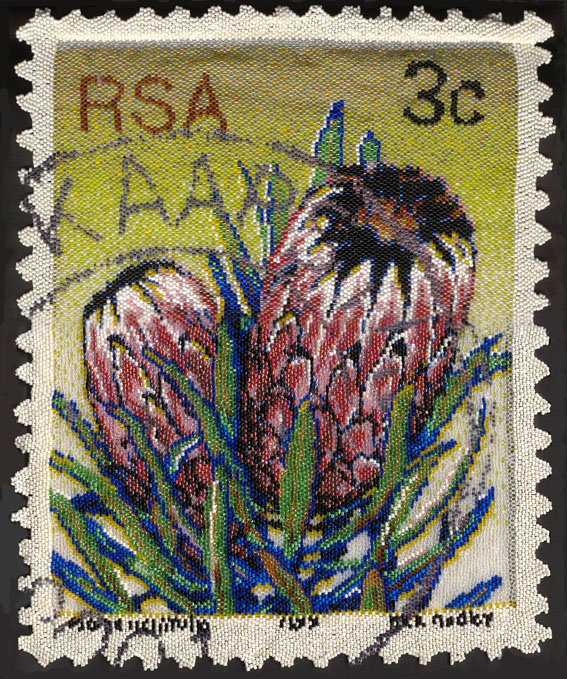
3rd Definitive Issue 3c Protea neriifolia

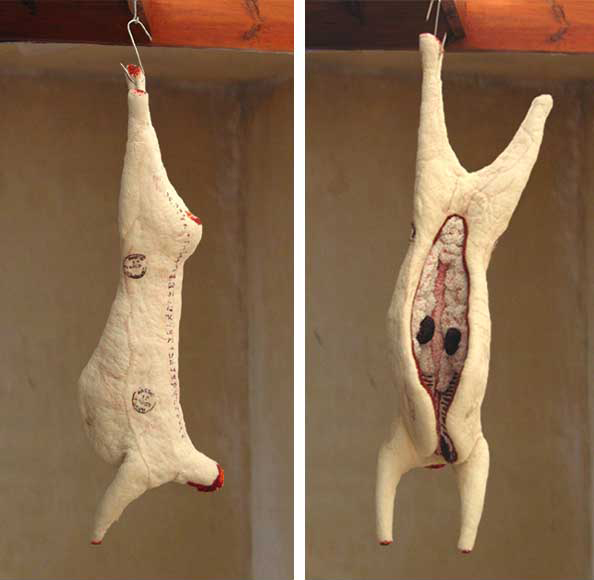
Blood Sweat and Tears

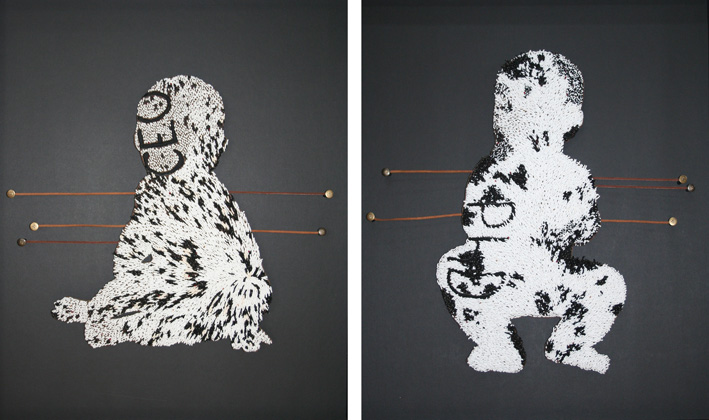
BabySkins CEO and PHD

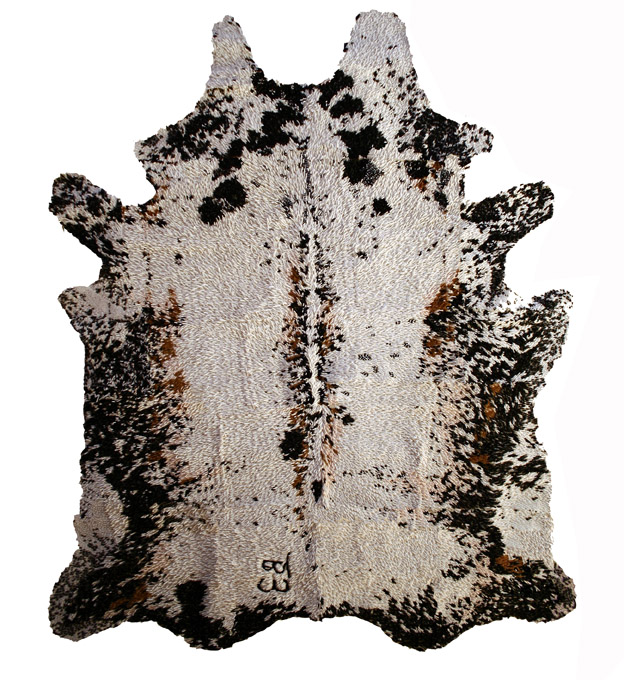
Abundance (Nguni Hide)

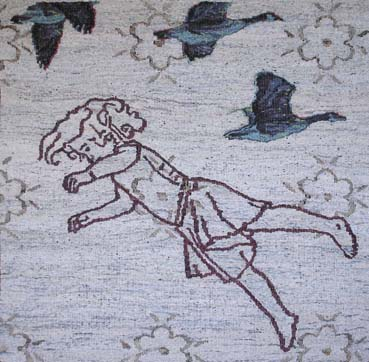
Falling into Herself

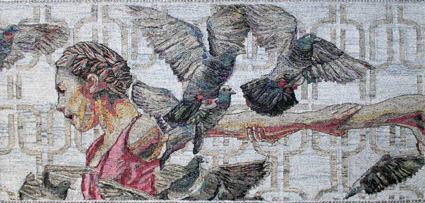
Flight

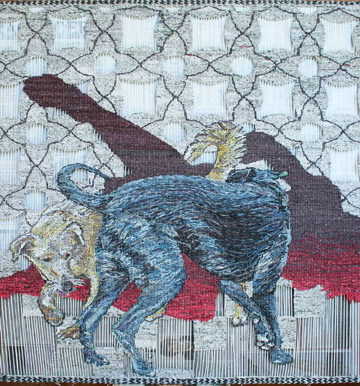
Silhouette

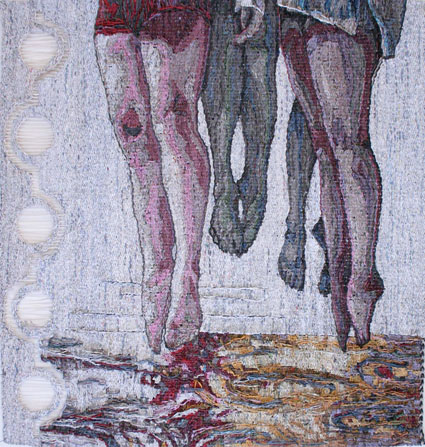
Taking Time

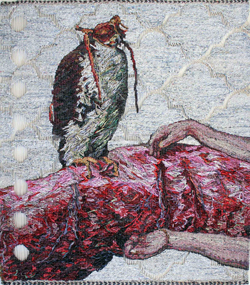
Waiting

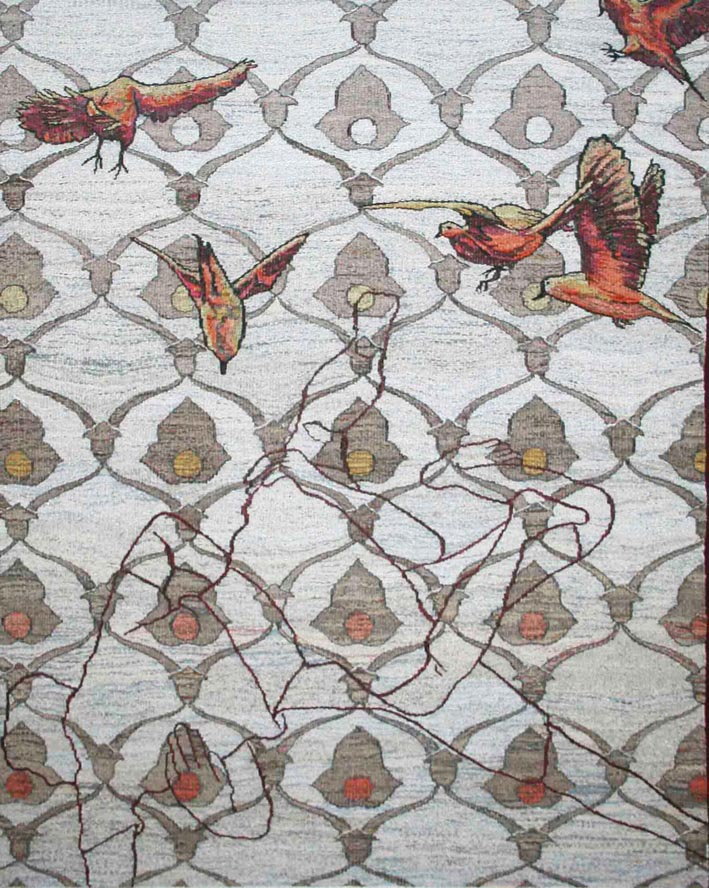
Wallpaper

== Works ==
=== Inherited Space ===
Mural at the Spier Wine Estate in Stellenbosch.

== Awards ==
- Merit Award, Brett Kebble Art Awards, Cape Town (2003)
- Silver medal, Kirstenbosch Biennale, Kirstenbosch Gardens, South Africa (2002)
- Silver-Gilt medal, Royal Horticultural Society Botanical Art Show, RHS, London (2002)
- Top graduate student of the year, Department of Fine Art, University of Stellenbosch, South Africa
