= Robson Blake =

Welsh rugby union footballer

- Born: Robson Blake; 15 May 1995 (age 31) Newport, Wales
- Height: 190 cm (6 ft 3 in)
- Weight: 130 kg (20 st 7 lb)

Rugby union career
Senior career
Years	Team	Apps	(Points)
2017-	Dragons	11	(0)
- Correct as of 28 May 2018

Robson Blake (born 15 May 1995) is a former Welsh rugby union player who plays as a flanker.

Blake made his debut for the Dragons regional team in 2016 having previously played for the Dragons academy and Bedwas RFC. He was released by the Dragons at the end of the 2017–18 season. In August 2018 Blake retired from rugby due to a concussion injury.
