= Ryan Blake =

Ryan Blake may refer to:

- Ryan Blake (footballer) (born 1991), Northern Ireland association footballer
- Ryan Blake (tennis) (born 1966), American NBA scout and former tennis player
