= Derek Blake =

British biochemist

Derek Blake was, until 2007, the Isobel Laing Post-Doctoral Fellow in Biomedical Sciences, and the Wellcome Trust Senior Fellow in Basic Biomedical Science, Oriel College, Oxford.

He holds a doctorate (D.Phil.) and a Bachelor's (B.Sc. from Liverpool). Blake graduated in Biochemistry and worked on his D.Phil. studies in the Sir William Dunn School of Pathology, Oxford, taking post-doctoral research on the molecular basis of muscular dystrophy.

His research interests lie in the molecular basis of neuronal dysfunction in patients with Duchenne muscular dystrophy and congenital muscular dystrophies (CMD). This led to the discovery of components of the dystrophin protein complex in neurons and identified new genes and pathways that are involved in the pathogenesis of CMD. He was awarded a Wellcome Trust Career Development Fellowship in 1996 and a Wellcome Trust Senior Fellowship in Basic Biomedical Science in 2000. Blake is a member of the American Society for Cell Biology and an editor of the Journal of Nanobiotechnology. Blake's research interests include molecular aspects of neuronal function in muscular dystrophies, glycosyltransferases in neurons and muscle cells, the neuromuscular junction and molecular architecture of the sarcolemma.

== Publications ==
- Blake D.J., Hawkes R., Benson M.A. and Beesley P. (1999) Different dystrophin-like complexes are found in neurons and glia. J. Cell Biol. 147: 645-657.
- Blake D.J. and Kröger S. (2000) The molecular neurobiology of muscular dystrophy: Learning lessons from muscle? Trends Neurosci. 23: 92-99.
- Newey S.E., Benson, M.A., Ponting C.P., Davies K.E. and Blake D.J. (2000) Alternative splicing of dystrobrevin regulates the stoichiometry of syntrophin binding to the dystrophin protein complex. Curr. Biol. 10: 12951298.
- Benson M.A., Newey S.E., Martin-Rendon E., Hawkes R. and Blake D.J. (2001) Dysbindin, a novel coiled-coil containing protein that interacts with the dystrobrevins in muscle and brain. J. Biol. Chem. 276: 24232-24241.
- Brockington M., Blake D. J., Prandini P., Brown S. C., Torelli S., Benson M. A., Ponting C. P., Estournet B., Romero N. B., Mercuri E., Voit T., Sewry C. A., Guicheney P. and Muntoni F. (2001) Mutations in the fukutin-related protein gene (FKRP) cause a form of congenital muscular dystrophy with secondary laminin a2 deficiency and abnormal glycosylation of a-dystroglycan. Am J. Hum. Genet. 69: 1198-1209.
- Brockington M., Yuva Y., Prandini P., Brown S. C., Torelli S., Benson M. A., Herrmann R., Anderson L. V. B., Bashir R., Burgunder J-M., Fallet S., Romero, N., Guicheney P., Fardeau M., Straub V., Reynolds G., Pollitt C., Sewry C. A., Bushby K., Voit T., Blake D. J. and Muntoni F. (2001) Mutations in the Fukutin Related-Protein gene (FKRP) identifies Limb Girdle Muscular Dystrophy 2I as a milder allelic variant of congenital muscular dystrophy MDC1C. Hum. Mol. Genet. 10: 2851-2859.
- Blake D. J, Weir A., Newey S. E. and Davies K. E. (2002) Function and genetics of dystrophin and dystrophin-related proteins in muscle. Phys. Rev. 82: 291-329.
