= Gil Blake =

American businessman

Gil Blake is a speculator, investor, and fund manager who devised an investment strategy known as mutual fund market timing. This method of investing is based on the historic pricing patterns of mutual funds.

== Career ==
Blake has attributed his participation in trading to a friend of his who had shown him some municipal bonds and inquired for Blake's opinion. Blake noticed a trend in the numbers his colleague had shown him and investigated further. His investigation led to the discovery that persistent trends in municipal bonds were decidedly systematic. This served as the basis of his mutual fund timing strategies. According to Barron's, Blake placed second in the U.S. Trading Championships in 1988 and first from 1989 to 1993..

== Biography ==
Blake was born July 14, 1945, in New York City.

== Sources ==
- Bonello, Professor F. (February 2, 1999). "The Mutual Fund Industry Scandal". Economics 421: Money, Credit, and Banking. University of Notre Dame. Archived from the original on 2006-01-05.
