= Doris Blake =

Doris Blake may refer to:

- Doris Blake (gymnast) (1911–1983), British Olympic gymnast
- Antoinette Donnelly (1887–1964), newspaper advice columnist under the byline Doris Blake
- Doris Holmes Blake (1892–1978), American entomologist and scientific illustrator
