= Donald Blake =

Donald Blake may refer to:

- Donald Blake, the fictional doctor identity of the Marvel Comics character Thor
- Donald R. Blake, American chemist
