= Philip Blake (disambiguation) =

Philip Blake (born 1985) is a Canadian football player.

Philip or Phillip Blake may also refer to:

- The Governor (The Walking Dead), whose name was thought to be Philip Blake
- Phil Blake (born 1963), Australian former rugby league footballer
- Phillip Blake, fictional character in the novel Five Little Pigs
- Philip Blake, English bass guitarist and member of Nothing but Thieves
