= Eddie Blake =

Eddie Blake may refer to:

- Eddie Blake (Watchmen), a Watchmen character
- Eddie Blake (American football) (born 1969), American football offensive guard
- Eddie Blake (sprinter), U.S. champion over 600 yards at the 1931 USA Indoor Track and Field Championships
