= Tom Blake =

Tom Blake may refer to:

- Tom Blake (footballer) (1872–1935), Australian rules footballer for Carlton and St Kilda
- Tom Blake (surfer) (1902–1994), American surfer and inventor
- Tom Blake (American football) (1927–2020), American football tackle
