= USC&GS George S. Blake =

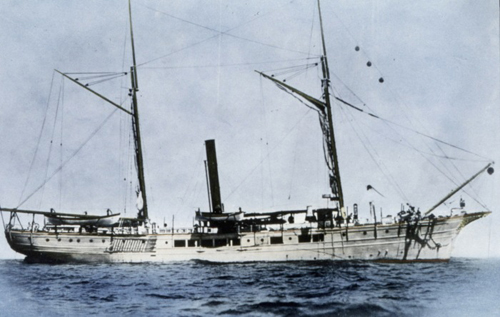
- USC&GS George S. Blake c.1870s

History

United States
- Namesake: Commodore George Smith Blake (1803-1871)
- Builder: E. J. Fardy, Baltimore, Maryland
- Cost: $84,600
- In service: 1874
- Out of service: 25 January 1905
- Fate: Sold

General characteristics
- Tonnage: 182 tons
- Length: 148 ft (45 m)
- Beam: 26 ft 6 in (8.08 m)
- Draft: 11 ft 8 in (3.56 m)
- Sail plan: Schooner

USC&GS George S. Blake, in service 1874–1905, is, with the U.S. Fish Commission steamer Albatross, one of only two US oceanographic vessels with her name inscribed in the façade of the Oceanographic Museum (Musée Océanographique), Monaco due to her being "the most innovative oceanographic vessel of the Nineteenth Century" with development of deep ocean exploration through introduction of steel cable for sounding, dredging and deep anchoring and data collection for the "first truly modern bathymetric map of a deep sea area."

== Construction ==
George S. Blake, a steam and sail schooner, was built at a cost of $84,600 in 1874 by E. J. Fardy, Baltimore, Maryland with dimensions of 148 feet 0 inches (45.11 m) length with 26 feet 6 inches (8.08 m) beam and draft of 11 feet 8 inches (3.56 m). It was named after late United States Naval Academy Superintendent George S. Blake.

== Notable events ==
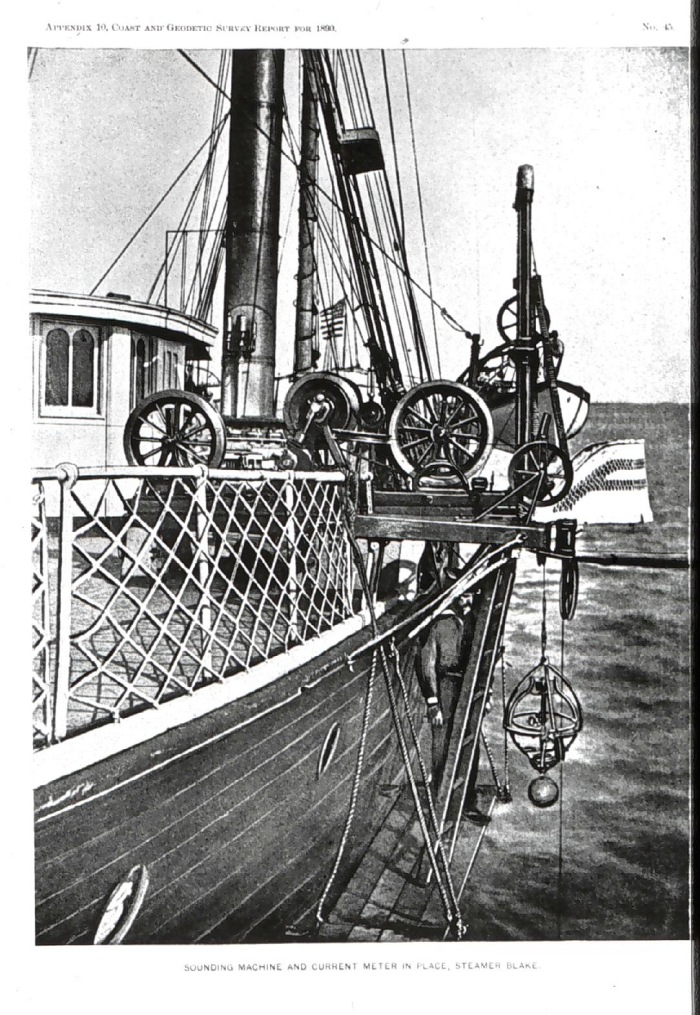
Sigsbee Sounding Machine – invented by Charles D. Sigsbee and modified from Thomson Sounding Machine. Basic design of ocean sounding instruments stayed the same for the next 50 years. Here the sounding machine is used to set a Pillsbury current meter at a known depth. In: The Gulf Stream, by John Elliott Pillsbury, 1891. Note caption on photo: "Sounding Machine And Current Meter in Place, Steamer Blake"

Among the notable discoveries linked to the ship was the definition of bathymetry proving an unexpected at the time and unusual feature of the United States continental slope, now named for the ship as the Blake Plateau. Initial findings of such a plateau were found in June 1880 during investigations of the Gulf Stream. During her first survey season, starting in June 1874, George S. Blake was being used to test deep sea equipment designed by Sir William Thomson, the Thomson Sounding Machine (also known as the Kelvin sounding machine), as modified by Commander Belknap, USN and to bring up specimens from 2,144 fathoms (12,864 ft; 3,921 m) in the Gulf of Maine. By the time the ship reached the Gulf of Mexico in 1875 under the command of Lieutenant Commander Charles Dwight Sigsbee, USN (Note: Many of the Survey's officers and men of the period were detached from the US Navy to the Coast and Geodetic Survey under existing law that required hydrography of the Coast Survey be executed by officers and men of the Navy when they can be furnished. Typical listing in these reports is as in the case of this officer: "Lieut. Commander John A. Howell, U.S.N., Assistant in the Coast Survey" where "Assistant" is a title for both high office and topographic survey management positions and ship's commanding officers.) the ship was using a modification of the Thomson sounding machine designed by Sigsbee, known as the Sigsbee sounding machine that was the standard wire sounding device for fifty years, and with the shot release device first tested the previous year with Sigsbee attached to the survey party.

=== The Gulf of Mexico ===
In addition to simple sounding, dredge samples, current measurements and even water column sampling with a "water cup devised" by Sigsbee, temperatures and other observations were made during surveys. By the close of the Gulf of Mexico surveys in 1876 the sounding lines and concurrent sampling by George S. Blake led to the assessment that "the data gathered this season may afford means for developing the main peculiarities of this large body of water"

During 1876 the ship became involved in work undertaken to understand the Gulf Stream and John E. Pillsbury designed the Pillsbury current meter when he was George S. Blake's executive officer in 1876. Though other work was done in the stream, that meter was not used until Pillsbury took command of the ship in 1884. It was in association with that work that the deep soundings across the current would reveal the Blake Plateau.

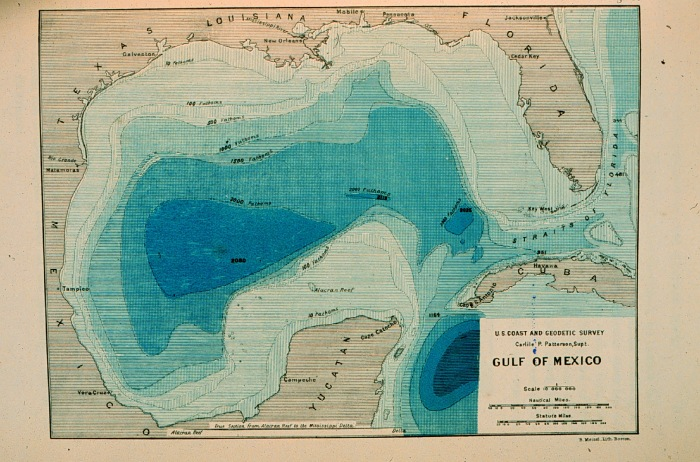
Contour map of the Gulf of Mexico as sounded by George S. Blake between 1873 and 1875. Over 3,000 soundings went into this chart, most of the deep water soundings taken by the Sigsbee Sounding Machine. "This was the first realistic bathymetric map of any oceanic basin."

By 1878 the Gulf Stream and Gulf work would see the addition of Alexander Agassiz, who joined the ship in December 1877 in Havana, with dredges and trawls for deep biological sampling. By June 1879 the ship had been completely refitted for deep sea sounding and dredging work. Under the command of John Pillsbury, from 1884 to 1889, the ship intensified Gulf Stream work with current measurements using his device, sounding lines from shore to beyond the current, temperatures and biological sampling.

=== Atlantic-Caribbean passages ===
In November 1878, Lieutenant Commander Sigsbee had completed deep surveys of the Gulf of Mexico and turned over command to Commander John R. Bartlett, USN (Note: The Navy oceanographic ship USNS Bartlett (T-AGOR-13) was named in his honor.) Bartlett exploited Sigsbee's development of the Sigsbee sounding machine and George S. Blake's refit to survey with Professor Agassiz in company for biological sample dredging, in the Windward Passage and the Caribbean. Agassiz left the ship at Barbados, reached March 1879 with malaria aboard, the dredging equipment unrigged and sounding lines run in the passages of the Windward Islands where it was noted "the channels thus developed seem to be merely depressions in a range of partly submerged mountains" while current measurements began to reveal actual circulation patterns in that part of the Atlantic.

In his own report Agassiz noted "One of the most interesting results reached by this year's cruise is the light thrown upon the former extension of the South American continent by the soundings taken while dredging, and those subsequently made in the passages between the islands by Commander Bartlett. Those together with soundings already known, enable us to trace the outline of the old continent ... and thus obtain some intelligible, and at the same time trustworthy, explanation of the peculiar geographical distribution of the fauna and flora of the West India Islands."

=== The Gulf Stream and Blake Plateau ===
1882 book about the steamer "Blake" by U. S. Navy Lieutenant-Commander Charles Sigsbee

By 1880 George S. Blake current data was supporting Bartlett's theory that "much of the supply for the Gulf Stream passes near the eastern end of Cuba." With Gulf Stream work coming to the fore the next season, a new electrical apparatus for recording temperatures was installed. After a northern season with Agassiz again aboard for dredging on Georges Bank, the ship went into winter lay up before setting out from Providence, Rhode Island 4 May 1881 for work in the Gulf Stream, described as:

The general limits of work executed during May and June are between Jupiter Inlet, Florida and Currituck Light House, North Carolina, between which points lines of soundings normal to the coast were run, extending across the Bahama Banks and, after leaving those banks, including the whole area swept by the Gulf Stream.

With Agassiz collecting biological samples and examining the Gulf Stream running from Cape Romain eastward, taking frequent soundings, Bartlett noted "depths on this line were unexpectedly small, the axis of the Gulf Stream being crossed before a depth of three hundred fathoms (1,800 ft; 550 m) was found", with a bottom of "hard coral" and little life. This was early indication of the plateau that would in the future carry the ship's name, and by 1882 Commander Bartlett had described the plateau in considerable detail:

Instead of a deep channel in the course of the Stream as reported by Lieutenants Maffit and Craven, and published in the Coast Survey Reports, our later soundings show an extensive and nearly level plateau, extending from a point to the eastward of the Little Bahama Banks to Cape Hatteras – off Cape Canaveral nearly 200 miles wide, and gradually contracting in width to the northward until reaching Hatteras, where the depth is more than 1000 fathoms within thirty miles of shore. This plateau has a general depth of 400 fathoms, suddenly dropping off on its eastern edge to over 2000 fathoms.

Bartlett reported the scouring effect of the current on the plateau, noting that on each side of the current the sounding cylinder, a device for sampling the nature of the bottom with the sounding, brought up ooze. In the current the "bottom was washed nearly bare" with particles being small and broken pieces of coral rock and so hard the sharp edge of the brass cylinder was bent.

In summary, the National Oceanic and Atmospheric Administration's History of NOAA Ocean Exploration: Breakthrough Years (1866-1922) notes:

The Coast Survey Steamer Blake was unique in the annals of oceanography. It is likely that more major innovations were made aboard the Blake than on any other ship of the 19th Century. The ship seemed to inspire its personnel to invent new equipment and improve upon methods, as its tradition of forging ahead of existing technology continued for many years and through a number of personnel changes.

=== Service history ===
Under the command of Commander John A. Howell, USN, George S. Blake immediately began innovative deep ocean work in 1874. Attached to the ship in the Gulf of Mexico was Lieutenant Commander D. Sigsbee to test his new device for releasing the heavy shot weights used in deep soundings. With development and installation of Sigsbee's sounding machine George S. Blake became the primary deep ocean sounding ship alternating between the Gulf of Maine and northern waters in summer and southern waters in winter. Soundings in the Gulf of Mexico by the end of 1875 were sufficient for production of the first true oceanic basin bathymetric chart.

By 1883 George S. Blake's boiler had "exceeded the limit of profitable repairs" and a contract was let for replacing the single boiler with two new designs in December 1883 with William L. Pettit, Baltimore. To fit within the old space the new boilers were of elliptical design. Delays in boiler completion were used to realign the shaft and for bottom repair.

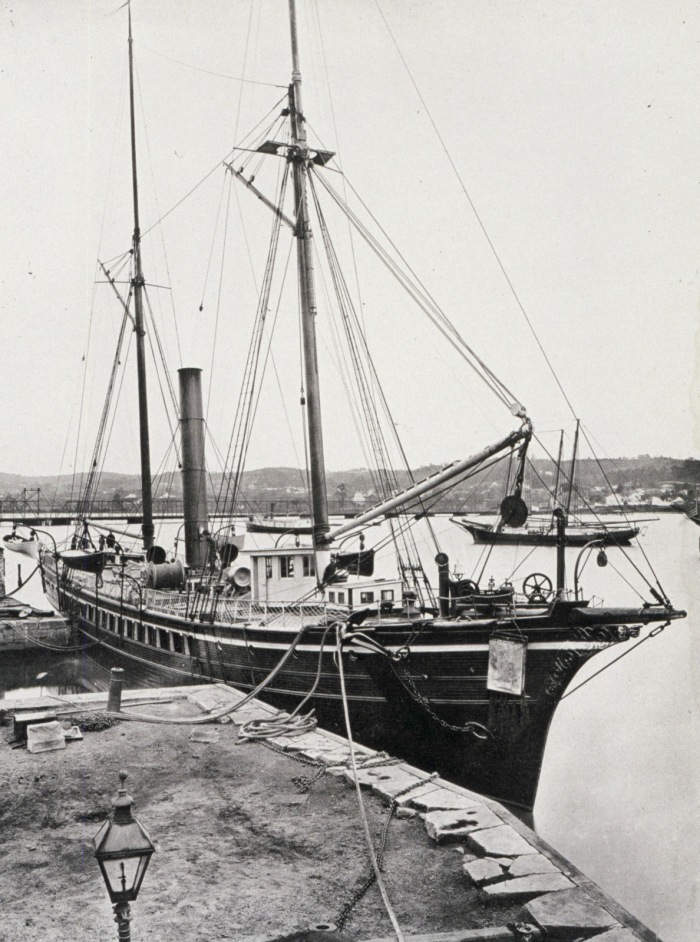
Coast and Geodetic Survey steamer Blake, Washington Navy Yard, c. 1880.

George S. Blake worked in the vicinity of Nantucket and Boston until 21 September 1892. She was in New York on 11 and 12 October to take part in the New York Columbian Celebration before heading south to make an examination of part of the Hatteras Shoal. On her return north she picked up the Survey's schooner Drift for tow on 2 December 1892 in Norfolk from where both ships went to the Washington Navy Yard. George S. Blake prepared there for her appearance at the World's Columbian Exposition in Chicago there until 2 April 1893 when she sailed north to join Bache in a special mission. The commanding officers of both Bache and George S. Blake had been directed on 30 March 1893, to support the speed trials of the new cruiser, USS Detroit in Newport Harbor. The final trial was over a 40-mile (64 km) course laid out in 1890 by the Coast and Geodetic Survey. The vessels supported current measurements on the course using the Pillsbury current meter through 17 April. George S. Blake then proceeded to Chicago, Illinois, to be a part of the Coast Survey's exhibit at the World's Columbian Exposition where she remained until 5 October 1893, sailing from Chicago 15 October and arriving in Baltimore on 24 November 1893.

Congress had instituted a radical change in the crewing of the vessels through appropriation law approved 6 June 1900 to the effect that beginning 1 July 1900 "all necessary employees to man and equip the vessels" were funded as opposed to the previous scheme in which US Navy officers had commanded and navy enlisted personnel had crewed the Survey's vessels. By prearrangement all naval personnel would remain with the ships until the first call at the home port, where the transfer would be made with the Survey reimbursing the navy for pay after 1 July for those personnel.

=== End of USC&GS service ===
In the summer of 1904 the ship was in Baltimore undergoing repairs with one last survey season in store. She left Baltimore 22 July 1904 for Frenchmans Bay and conducted wire-drag sweeping of the bay and magnetic observations from 29 July until the season's close. George S. Blake arrived back in Baltimore 6 November 1904, was laid up 22 December and placed out of commission on 25 January 1905.

One vessel, the historic steamer Blake, with an international reputation in the work of deep-sea sounding and Gulf Stream investigations, having become so old that the amount required for repairs was excessive, was sold at auction."
