= Geoffrey Blake =

Geoffrey Blake is the name of:

- Geoffrey Blake (actor) (born 1962), American film and television actor
- Geoffrey Blake (athlete) (1914–1991), English athlete
- Geoffrey Blake (Royal Navy officer) (1882–1968), Fourth Sea Lord

== See also ==
- Jeff Blake (born 1970), American football player
- Geoff Blakely (born 1959), New Zealand cricketer
