= Casey Nelson Blake =

American historian

- Education: Wesleyan University (BA); University of Rochester (MA, PhD)
- Occupation: Intellectual historian
- Employer(s): Columbia University; Indiana University Bloomington, Washington University in St. Louis, Reed College

Casey Nelson Blake is a historian and the Mendelson Family Professor of American Studies at Columbia University. He has written Beloved Community: The Cultural Criticism of Randolph Bourne, Van Wyck Brooks, Waldo Frank, and Lewis Mumford (1990) and edited The Arts of Democracy: Art, Public Culture, and the State (2007).

He received his B.A. from Wesleyan University, and MA and PhD from University of Rochester. Before coming to Columbia, he taught at Indiana University Bloomington, Washington University in St. Louis, and Reed College.
