= Frederick Blake =

Frederick Blake may refer to:

- Frederick Blake Jr. (born 1977), Canadian politician
- Frederick Donald Blake (1908–1997), Scottish artist
