= David Blake =

David Blake may refer to:

- David Blake (composer) (born 1936), British composer
- David Blake (English cricketer) (1925–2015), former English cricketer
- David Blake (New Zealand cricketer) (born 1971), New Zealand cricketer
- David Blake (general) (1887–1965), Australian Major General
- Dave Blake (1925–2008), politician from Manitoba Canada
- David Blake (born 1971), known as StankDawg, founder of the hacking group Digital DawgPound
- David Stones (born David Blake, 1988), stage name of U.S. rapper
- DJ Quik (born David Blake, 1970), stage name of U.S. rapper/record producer
- David Blake / Wōden, a character in The Wicked + The Divine
