= Catherine Blake (disambiguation) =

Catherine Blake (1762–1831) was the wife and assistant of William Blake.

Catherine Blake or similar may also refer to:

== People ==
- Catherine C. Blake (1950–2026), United States federal judge
- Katherine Blake (actress) (1921–1991), South African-born British actress
- Katharine Blake (singer) (born 1970), British musician
- Dorothy J. Heydt (1942–2022), American author, pen name Katherine Blake
- Katherine Devereux Blake (1858–1950), American educator, peace and women's rights activist
- Catherine Blake (née Wright), mother of William Blake

== Fictional entities ==
- Katherine Blake (character), killer on the soap opera Shortland Street

== See also ==
- Katarina Eriksdotter (12th-century), Swedish princess, married to Nils Blake
- Kathy Blake (Kathleen Blake, born 1946), American tennis player
