= Paul Blake =

Paul Blake may refer to:

- Paul Blake (actor, born 1904) (1904–1960), British actor
- Paul Blake (actor, born 1949), most famous for portraying Greedo in the 1977 film Star Wars
- Paul Blake (basketball), current chairman of the British Basketball League
- Frankie Paul (1965–2017), Jamaica singer, real name Paul Blake
- Paul Blake (field hockey) (born 1983), South African field hockey player
- Paul Blake (athlete) (born 1990), British Paralympic athlete
- Paul Blake (theatre) (born 1941), American theatre writer, producer, and director
