= Governor Blake =

Governor Blake may refer to:

- Joseph Blake (governor), 11th Colonial Governor of the Province of South Carolina
- Henry Arthur Blake, Governor of the Bahamas from 1884 to 1887, Colonial Governor of Newfoundland from 1887 to 1889, Governor of Jamaica from 1889 to 1898, Governor of Hong Kong from 1898 to 1903, and Governor of Ceylon from 1903 to 1907

== See also ==
- The Governor (The Walking Dead), fictional given name Brian Blake
