= Gerald Blake =

Gerald Blake may refer to:

- Gerald Blake (academic), British academic
- Gerald Blake (cricketer) (born 1944), South African cricketer
- Gerald Blake (director) (1928–1991), British television director
