= James Blake =

James or Jim Blake is the name of:

== People ==
=== Civil administration, military or politics ===
- James B. Blake (1827–1870), American politician, mayor of Worcester, Massachusetts
- James H. Blake (1768–1819), American politician, mayor of Washington, D.C.
- James Henry Blake (1808–1874), Boston Police Marshal in 1840
- James Henry Blake (zoologist) (1845–1941), American zoologist and scientific illustrator
- James "Spanish" Blake (died 1635), Irish spy during the Irish Nine Years' War
- Jim Blake (Australian politician) (1921–2010), member of the Queensland Legislative Assembly

=== Arts and entertainment ===
- James W. Blake (1862–1935), American lyricist
- James Blake (pianist) (1922–1979), British-American jazz musician
- James Carlos Blake (1943–2025), American writer, winner of Los Angeles Times Book Prize
- James Blake (musician) (born 1988), English singer-songwriter
  - James Blake (album), self-titled debut album
- Eubie Blake (James Hubert Blake, 1887–1983), American musician
- James Blake (television presenter) (born 1993), Northern Irish television presenter

=== Other people ===
- James Blake (tennis) (born 1979), American professional tennis player, and later Miami tournament director
- James F. Blake (1912–2002), American bus driver defied by Rosa Parks
- James Vila Blake (1842–1925), American Unitarian minister, playwright and poet
- Ronald James Blake (born 1934), British civil engineer in Hong Kong, CEO of KCRC

== Fictional characters ==
- Jim Blake, fictional character in the film Across the Plains (1928)

== See also ==
- James Blake House, oldest house in Boston
