= P. L. Blake =

American gridiron football player (born 1936)

Profile
- Position: End

Personal information
- Born: August 18, 1936 (age 90); Greenwood, Mississippi, U.S.
- Listed height: 5 ft 11 in (1.80 m)
- Listed weight: 185 lb (84 kg)

Career information
- College: Mississippi State

Career history
- 1960–1961: Edmonton Eskimos
- 1961–1962: Saskatchewan Roughriders

Pressley Larcus Blake (born August 18, 1936) is an American former professional football player who played for the Edmonton Eskimos and Saskatchewan Roughriders. He played college football at the Mississippi State University.
