= Senator Blake =

Senator Blake may refer to:

- Edward Reed Blake (1844–1923), Wisconsin State Senate
- Harris Blake (1929–2014), North Carolina State Senate
- Harrison G. O. Blake (1818–1876), Ohio State Senate
- John Blake (Pennsylvania politician) (born 1960), Pennsylvania State Senate
- Matt Blake (politician) (born 1988), Iowa State Senate
- Samuel Blake (1807–1887), Maine State Senate
