= Matthew Blake =

Matthew or Matt Blake may refer to:

- Matthew Blake (rugby league) (born 1983), English rugby league player
- Matthew Robert Blake (1876–1937), Canadian politician
- Matt Blake (born 1985), American baseball coach
- Matt Blake (politician), Iowa state legislator
- Matt Blake, character in Ambush at Cimarron Pass
