= Ernest Blake (footballer) =

English footballer

Personal information
- Date of birth: 24 March 1895
- Place of birth: Hednesford, England
- Date of death: 1965 (aged 69–70)
- Position: Winger

Senior career*
Years	Team	Apps	(Gls)
1914–1920	Grimsby Rovers		
1920–1921	Grimsby Town	7	(0)
1921–1922	Grimsby Rovers		
1922–1923	Haycroft Rovers		
1923–192?	Grimsby Rovers		
- * Club domestic league appearances and goals

Ernest Blake (24 March 1895 – 1965) was an English professional footballer who played as a winger.
