= Russell Blake =

Russell Blake may refer to:

- Russell Blake (footballer) (1935–2024), English professional footballer
- Russell Blake (author), American novelist

== See also ==
- Blake Russell (born 1975), American long-distance runner
