= Sarah Blake (silversmith) =

English silversmith

- Occupation: Silversmith

Sarah Blake (sometimes Blane) was an English silversmith.

A resident of London, Blake specialized in the making of spoons. She was the wife of John Blake, a smallworker and spoonmaker, and went into metalworking after his death, registering her first date mark on 15 June 1809. A second mark was registered on 9 January 1821, with a third on 7 November the same year; a variety of marks are known. Blake worked in partnership with her son, John William Blake, and lived at 16 Long Acre. She was retired or dead by February 1823, at which time John registered a mark alone. Besides spoons, the pair produced other tableware, such as forks and tongs.

Several pieces by the Blakes are currently owned by the National Museum of Women in the Arts. These include six Regency teaspoons, dated to 1812; a George IV dessert spoon, dated to 1820; and a George IV sauce ladle, dated to 1821.
