= Larry Blake (hurler) =

Irish hurler

Personal information
- Native name: Labhrás de Bláca (Irish)
- Born: 7 March 1909 Ennis, County Clare, Ireland
- Died: 5 October 1957 (aged 48)
- Occupation: Carpenter/Builder

Sport
- Sport: Hurling
- Position: Left wing-back
Club
- Years: Club
- Ennis Dalcassians
Club titles
- Clare titles: 1
Inter-county
- Years: County
- 1929-1939: Clare
Inter-county titles
- Munster titles: several
- All-Irelands: 0
- NHL: 0

Laurence "Larry" Blake (7 March 1909 – 5 October 1957) was an Irish hurler who played as a left wing-back for the Clare senior team.

Blake made his first appearance for the team during the 1929 championship and was a regular member of the starting fifteen for a decade until his retirement after the 1939 championship. During that time he won one Munster medal and was a regular member of the Munster team (inter provincial). Blake was an All-Ireland runner-up on one occasion.

At club level Blake was a one-time county club championship medalist with Ennis Dalcassians.
