= Korban Blake =

British multi-genre author

- Occupations: Author and artist
- Known for: Survivalism: Ringlands and Surviving The Cuts And Other Disasters science fiction books: Ravenous Cavernous
- Website: korbanblake.co.uk

Korban Blake is a British multi-genre author whose work includes science fiction, horror and apocalyptic and post-apocalyptic fiction, and a non-fiction survivalism guide, as well as poetry, and news articles. Recent works are published by Archaeopteryx Books.

Blake is also an outsider artist and displays art work in exhibitions local to the East Anglia region of the United Kingdom. Blake is also an activist and campaigner for civil liberties, human rights and environmental issues.

== Early life and education ==
According to Facebook, Blake currently resides in Norwich, Norfolk (UK), and has been employed as a journalist, going on to become the editor for the local newspaper The Cromer Times; and has also worked as a Private Investigator. Korban Blake studied Sustainability at the University of Illinois, and Disaster Preparedness at the University of Pittsburgh for book research purposes.

Blake cites Roald Dahl, Andre Maurois (Fattipuffs and Thinifers) and Richard Adams (Watership Down) as childhood literary influences.

Further, Blake says "In my teens my main influences were James Herbert and Stephen King, as I discovered the world of horror fiction." In another interview, Blake also cites Shaun Hutson as an influence, and said "Without all of these influences, there very probably would be no Korban Blake."

== Writing career ==
The first published short story book, Ringlands, was written in 2012, and is dedicated to political organiser and Internet activist Aaron Swartz. The second book, Ravenous Cavernous, was written in 2013.

A non-fiction guide called Surviving The Cuts, And Other Disasters was published on 27 March 2013 by Archaeopteryx Books.

In an interview, Blake talked about Surviving The Cuts, And Other Disasters: "(Surviving The Cuts, and Other Disasters) is a guide designed to help people through the economic and environmental difficulties we are facing." In another, Blake said of Surviving The Cuts, And Other Disasters: "I wrote about preppers in Surviving The Cuts, and the days of viewing those people who store food and essentials for their family 'just in case' as paranoid and crazy are really over. I think hurricane Katrina, and other terrible events have changed everything for thousands of ordinary people. We know that we cannot depend on Governments to take care of us, so we must do it for ourselves. Being ready to take care of ourselves and our families – that's prepping."

Blake lives in the East Anglia region of England.

Blake launched the first short story exclusively to the Amazon Kindle market in 2013. Anticipating that people purchasing eBooks would be looking for bargains, Blake priced the book at the minimum price for independent writers (approximately $.99 USD) in order to make it as accessible as possible, and sometimes offers the book for free.

In November 2012 Blake took up the NaNoWriMo writing challenge and wrote 50,000 words of the forthcoming novel Extant in just 30 days.

== Published works ==
Blake's books include themes of science fiction, fantasy, humour, internet activism, and survival. Settings are typically East Anglia. The dark humour fantasy short story 'Ravenous Cavernous' is set in a fictional land, following the wacky adventure of the main character, Poilu-Flux, on a journey of discovery about the interpretation of fear. The story contains numerous made up words.

== Artwork ==
Blake is a multimedia artist, painter and photographer, and describes the work as outsider art. Blake shows art work in exhibitions locally in the Norfolk and Suffolk areas.

== Activism ==
Blake has stated in interview 'I very openly support causes that are important to me, I've attended peaceful protests, and will always defend the right to freedom of expression.'

Blake said: "There are political references in Extant too, and Ringlands talks about the danger of entering into a database state, the growing use of drones and excess CCTV in the UK. These topics are included because they are relevant to the story – in Ringlands they essentially are the story – I won't apologise for that. If it leads to more people reading more on the subjects I raise, then I would say that is a good thing. Not enough people know or understand just how little freedom we have left."

=== Bibliography ===
| Publication year | Title | Original publisher | ISBN | Notes |
|---|---|---|---|---|
| 2013 | Ringlands (A Kaplan Short Story) | Archaeopteryx Books | ISBN 978-1482580259 | Paperback (2013), Amazon Kindle eBook (2013) ASIN B00B8X75O2 |
| 2013 | Ravenous Cavernous | Archaeopteryx Books | ISBN 9781301766505 | (Amazon Kindle edition: ASIN B00BFECAY4 |
| 2013 | Surviving The Cuts, And Other Disasters | Archaeopteryx Books | ISBN 9781301381203 | (Amazon Kindle edition: ASIN B00C3OU3NU |
