= Johnny Blake =

Australian rules footballer

Personal information
- Full name: John Ashby Blake
- Born: 17 November 1930
- Died: 13 May 2024 (aged 93)
- Original team: Northcote
- Height: 180 cm (5 ft 11 in)
- Weight: 73 kg (161 lb)

Playing career^{1}
Years	Club	Games (Goals)
1951	Carlton	3 (0)
- ^{1} Playing statistics correct to the end of 1951.

John Ashby Blake (17 November 1930 – 13 May 2024) was an Australian rules footballer who played with Carlton in the Victorian Football League (VFL).
