= Edgar W. Schwellenbach =

American judge (1887–1957)

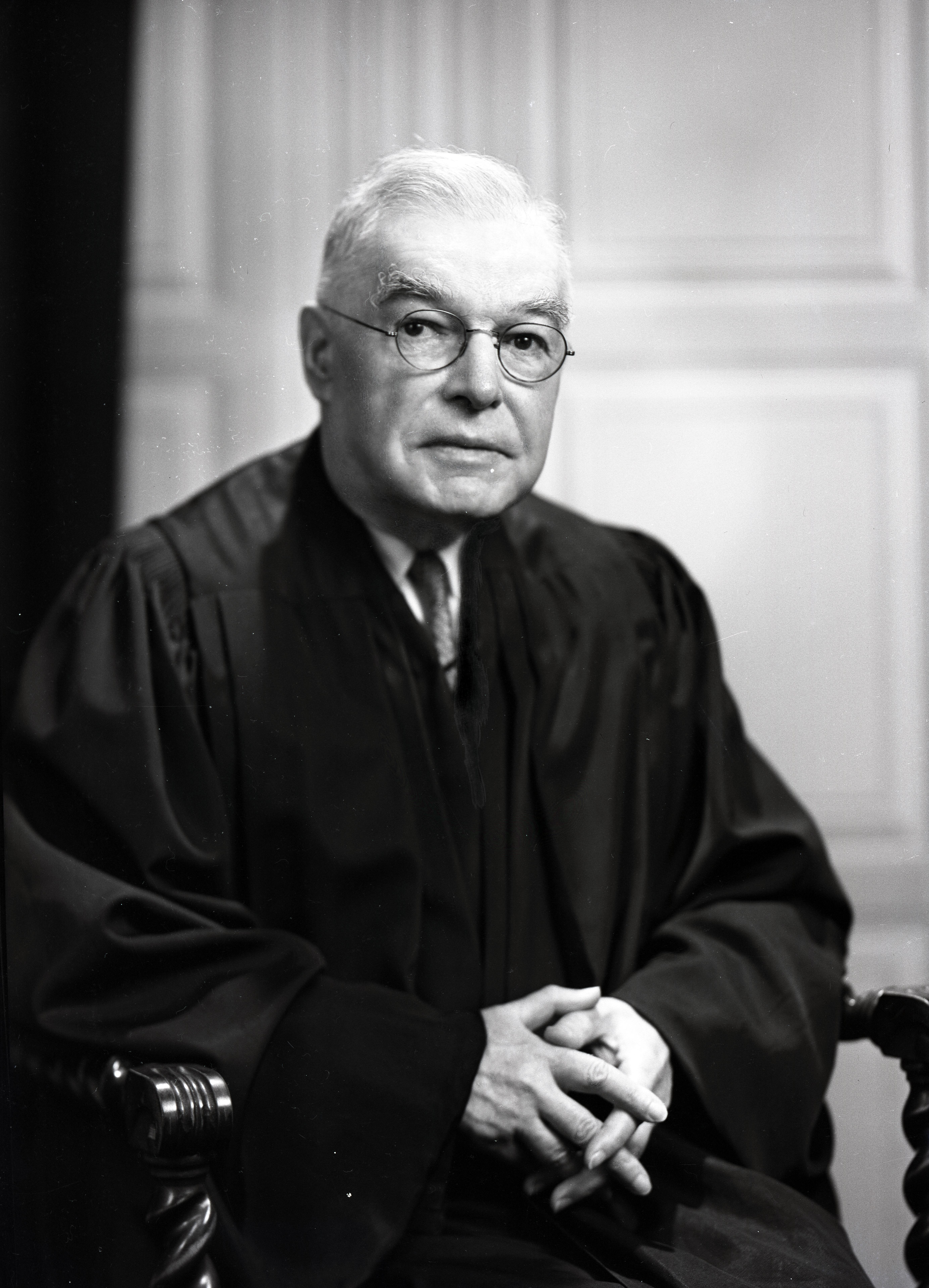
Schwellenbach in 1955

Edgar Ward Schwellenbach (March 16, 1887 – September 22, 1957) was a justice of the Washington Supreme Court from 1946 to 1957, serving as chief justice in 1951 and 1952.

Schwellenbach graduated from the University of Wisconsin Law School in 1924 and gained admission to the bar in Washington the following year. He practiced law in Port Angeles, Washington for two years, and then moved to Ephrata, Washington. Schwellenbach was the prosecuting attorney for Grant County from 1931 to 1939, and was a superior court judge for Grant and Douglas Counties from 1939 to 1946. On September 1, 1946, Governor Arthur B. Langlie appointed Schwellenbach to a seat on the Washington Supreme Court vacated by the retirement of Justice Bruce Blake. Schwellenbach was subsequently reelected, serving until his death. At the time of his death, Schwellenbach had already announced his intent to retire that year. He died two weeks after having surgery, from which he had appeared to recover successfully.

Schwellenbach was the brother of Senator Lewis B. Schwellenbach.

Political offices
Preceded by Bruce Blake	Justice of the Washington Supreme Court; 1946–1957	Succeeded by Robert T. Hunter
