= Annie Blake =

Canadian politician

Member of the Yukon Legislative Assembly for Vuntut Gwitchin
- In office April 12, 2021 – November 3, 2025
- Preceded by: Pauline Frost
- Succeeded by: Debra-Leigh Reti

Personal details
- Party: Yukon New Democratic Party

Annie Blake is a Canadian politician, who was elected to the Yukon Legislative Assembly in the 2021 Yukon general election. She represented the electoral district of Vuntut Gwitchin as a member of the Yukon New Democratic Party.

She finished in a 78–78 tie with incumbent MLA Pauline Frost on election night, which was further confirmed on a recount. Under Yukon election law, an exact tie between candidates is settled by drawing lots, and Blake was drawn as the winner. This was the second time in the history of the district, following the 1996 Yukon general election, that an election resulted in an exact tie settled in this manner.

Blake served as Deputy Speaker and Chair of Committee of the Whole of the Yukon Legislative Assembly. She also served as the Third Party critic for Health and Social Services, Justice, Tourism and Culture, and Youth Issues. She was defeated in the 2025 Yukon general election.

== Electoral record ==
2025 Yukon general election: Vuntut Gwitchin
Party	Candidate	Votes	%	±%
Liberal	Debra-Leigh Reti	52	39.69	-10.31
New Democratic	Annie Blake	45	34.35	-15.65
Yukon Party	Sandra Charlie	34	25.95	New
Total valid votes		131		
Total rejected ballots				
Turnout			68.23	
Eligible voters		192		
Liberal gain from New Democratic		Swing		+2.67
Source(s) "Recount confirms Liberal win in Yukon's Vuntut Gwitchin riding". CBC News.

2021 Yukon general election
Party	Candidate	Votes	%	±%
New Democratic	Annie Blake	78	50.0	+48.0
Liberal	Pauline Frost	78	50.0	-1.3
Total valid votes				
Total rejected ballots				
Turnout		156	76.5	
Eligible voters		204		
New Democratic gain from Liberal		Swing		+24.2
Source(s) "Unofficial Election Results 2021". Elections Yukon.
