= George Stanfield Blake =

British mineral and mining geologist

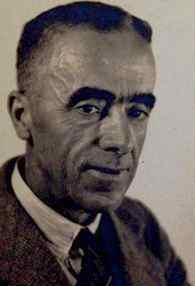
Blake in the 1920s

George Stanfield Blake (1876–1940) was a British mineral and mining geologist, fluent in French, Italian, German and latterly his family understood Palestinian Arabic/Levantine Arabic, which aided his later survey work.

== Early career (1900–1922) ==
On completing his degree at age 21, he worked as an assayer in London and at the Royal Mines of Elba. During the period of 1900/1901 to 1909 he was on staff at the Scientific and Technical Department of the Imperial Institute engaged in mineralogical studies of Crown colonies. Here, with Dunstan, thorianite from Ceylon was described as a new mineral and he published papers on baddeleyite and zirkelite from Ceylon and carnotite from South Australia. After this, he spent time in Matto Grosso, Brazil exploring for minerals, looking for gold at Timmins around Porcupine Lake, Ontario, and prospecting for petroleum in Newfoundland and Canada. On returning to England in 1915, he worked at Warrington as a mineral analyst and then at Sheffield as deputy chief analyst, both roles for the Ministry of Munitions. Between 1920 and 1922 he worked as a tutor at the Imperial College of Science and Technology.

== Palestine ==
From 1922 to 1939, Blake was employed as Geological Advisor to the Mandatory Government of Palestine, where the most basic exploratory challenges existed and his analytical interpretive work from mineralogical and mining knowledge led him to complete the geological corner stones for Palestine and Transjordan. Having grappled with the absence of mapping, he built on former work and published the first Water Resources Survey of Palestine in 1928. Later he worked with the Potash Company (Novomeyski), on sulphur mining near Gaza, bituminous shales, phosphate, iron (Ajlun) and Roman exploited copper deposits at Fenan (Wadi Feynan) that enabled him to develop his 1930 paper.

This ultimately completed his stratigraphic interpretation of depositional environments and structural changes/events, which can be found in the geological maps and reports from 1937 and 1939. Blake's 1939 report formed a major part of M.G. Ionides' book, Report on the Water Resources of Transjordan and Their Development. Chapter IV on Geology, Soils and Minerals was taken from Blake's unpublished report in its original form and Chapter V on The River System of the Jordan and Dead Sea Basin is largely Blake's text just rearranged to suit the study and with additional hydrographs.

Blake's last writings were incorporated, like the Ionides report, in Goldschmidt's account on water resources, and were published posthumously after his death. This report being influential in developing and managing water resources for agriculture and locating settlements.

== Later life ==
Blake retired in 1939 to be with his wife Amy (née Marsden) and children Geoffrey, Paul, Barbara (King), Audrey (Rowland) and Joan (Kennard) in England. A year later he returned to Palestine in consultancy work exploring for petroleum and had been content with oil signs in the graben on the western border and evidence of domal structures.^{[16]}

He advised his family of a practice exploring without weapons or guards. Given the differing goals of the British Mandate, Zionist and Palestinian Arab populations this was not the case certainly in later years. Perhaps from 1936 when stability in Palestine deteriorated, which resulted in increasing tension between countrymen and colonies the use of military police to protect surveys commenced. Certainly from August 1938 as an important contributory topographical or ordnance survey of perennial streams in the Jordan Valley was being conducted by the British Mandatory Government. That August the surveyors camp was attacked and the camp leader Mr V. Serbinovitch together with two assistants were killed by bandits.^{[preface 13]}

On his last field group excursion Blake was provided a personal British Military Police escort Mr Jacob Vicky (Yakob Shviki). When the camp broke at the end, Blake and Vicky stayed on to explore further. As outlined in obituaries, on 4 July 1940, Blake and his escort Vicky were shot dead by Arab brigands at the mouth of Wadi Zoiir or Nahal Zohar in the Dead Sea Basin.

== Commemoration ==
His former colleague Picard wrote of his contributions to improving geological knowledge of the Palestinian natural assets and closed the paper with Shaw-Welling's words: "His contribution to our knowledge of the geology of Palestine will be his permanent monument." Blake is buried in the Protestant Church in Jerusalem. The Israel Geological Society honoured his memory by erecting a plaque in 1960 near the spot where his life ended.

== Geopolitics ==
Jemal Pasha, the Ottomans and German military support were driven from Jerusalem and the town surrendered to the British on 9 December 1917. Pasha had been brutally ruthless against Arab and Jewish residents alike.

Germany introduced the Nuremberg Laws in 1936, which resulted in many Jews entering Palestine. This angered the majority Palestinian Arabs leading to the 1936-39 Arab revolt in Palestine, which the Haganah helped the British quell. In attempting to manage this the British government developed MacDonald's White Paper of 1939, which had looked to partition the colony into two states whilst severely limiting the number of Jewish refugees entering Palestine at a time of their greatest need. Zionist right wing members and Palestinian factions both considered British imperialism as long term obstacles to freedom, some harbouring German sympathisers. Lehi, an offshoot of Irgun, was an underground paramilitary group with an avowed aim of forcibly evicting the British and was established in June 1940 in Mandatory Palestine.

Italy entered WWII on 10 June 1940 and the Vichy Government was effectively formed on 22 June 1940, which resulted in the Syrian/Lebanon colonies coming under their control. Their Army of the Levant included North African Troops or tirailleurs with contingents from Algeria, Morocco and Tunisia. On 3 July 1940 the allies struck with an Attack on Mers-el-Kebir and once again the panoply of warfare enveloped Jerusalem and Palestine.

British Mandate finished on 14 May 1948. 1967 Moshe Dayan as Defence Minister commands absolute victory securing Jerusalem and Israel in the Six Days War.
