= Maurice Blake (philatelist) =

American philatelist

- Born: November 1, 1888
- Died: 1969 (aged 80–81)
- Occupation: Philatelist

Maurice Cary Blake (1 November 1888 – 1969) was an American philatelist who signed the Roll of Distinguished Philatelists in 1962.
