= Jason Blake =

Jason Blake may refer to:

- Jason Blake (ice hockey) (born 1973), American former ice hockey player
- Jason Blake (footballer) (born 1981), Australian rules footballer
