= Gladys Blake (writer) =

American writer

Gladys Blake was an American author of juvenile fiction. She was born in Fayetteville, Tennessee to George Everett and Blanche (Morgan) Blake. She was educated in Nashville, Tennessee public schools. Her first story was published in the Nashville Banner when she was seven.

Writer of:

- The Mysterious Tutor, 1925;
- The Old King's Treasure, 1926;
- At Bow View, 1926;
- The Scratches on the Glass, 1927;
- Doris Derides, 1927;
- Dona Isabella's Adventures, 1928,
- The Pomdexter Pride, 1929;
- Fortunate Shipwreck, 1936;
- Sally Goes to Court, 1937;
- The Mystery of the Silver Chain, 1939;
- Henrietta and the Governor, 1964.

Contributor to Youth's Companion and various other publications. General character writing, juvenile fiction. Lived at Atlanta, Georgia.

== Sources ==
- WHO'S WHO AMONG NORTH AMERICAN AUTHORS VOL - IV 1929 - 1930 by ALBERTA LAWRENCE p. 108 link
