= Judith Blake (disambiguation) =

Judith Blake may refer to

- Judith Blake, Baroness Blake of Leeds (born 1953), British politician
- Judith Blake (scientist), American computational biologist
- Judith Blake (sociologist) (1926–1993), American sociologist and demographer
