= Shanin Blake =

American pop singer (born 1994)

Shanin Blake (Shannon B. Lowrey; born October 31, 1994) is an American singer and online personality.

== Early life ==
Blake was born in Moscow, Idaho, on October 31, 1994. She was raised in Bluffdale, Utah by a vocational counselor mother and a father who worked as a contract pilot until their divorce during her childhood.

In 2011, when she was 17 years old, Blake became pregnant with a daughter, whom she is currently raising as a single mother. Her daughter appears regularly on Blake's social media accounts.

== Music career ==
In 2019, Blake moved from Utah to San Diego, California, and established herself in the local music scene. She recorded a song, "Stop, Wait a Minute", that year, that became locally popular and led to her being covered in local media. Blake later recounted that she was traveling, possibly in Costa Rica, during the song's initial success, and had been only vaguely aware of the extent of its popularity.

She rose to a wider level of prominence between 2023 and 2024, spurred by her increased visibility on social media platforms like Instagram, and TikTok. She sold out her first headline performance in Denver, Colorado, towards the end of 2023 before embarking on a national tour in 2024.

She has self-released two full-length albums, Soul Child (2018) and Divine Dopamine (2024), but has also featured on songs released under micro record labels like New Age Kids and Nebula Records.

Her music often features whispered or "ethereal" vocals over lo-fi hip-hop and dream-pop beats. In a 2024 interview with Rolling Stone magazine, she described her style as "affirmation music", defining it as "self-empowering songs that share different types of modalities I've learned, such as manifestation or law of attraction". Later in 2024, she was profiled in the magazine Dazed, which described her music as "sung to the sort of neo-soul cadence reminiscent of artists like Erykah Badu and Noname". Her musical influences are cited as Verzache, Surfaces, Jack Johnson, and Billie Eilish.

Her online presence, spurred by her image as "Hippie Barbie" (a nickname arising from what has been called her "often risqué hippie aesthetic"), has allowed her to build a dedicated fanbase. In April 2024, Blake was described in the press as "a veteran singer" and "TikTok superstar" noted for her virality.

== Controversies ==
Both the Rolling Stone and Dazed magazines feature points to the contentious nature of Shanin Blake's celebrity. While Blake has over a million followers across her various social media accounts (Snapchat, Instagram, YouTube, TikTok, OnlyFans), she has faced significant criticism online for a range of issues with her public image mostly of adult content. In their article, Rolling Stone magazine said that Blake is "among the most reviled creators on TikTok".

In a video clip posted to social media from her February 26, 2024, self-released single, "Peru Song", Blake, it is reported, sings that she was able to heal her kidney infection "with her mind", through positive thoughts and "good vibes". The song, which the singer says is "literally a diary entry of an experience that I had when I did ayahuasca and San Pedro in Peru with the shamans there", has garnered criticism from many online for the unscientific basis of her claims. There is no evidence that ayahuasca, a South American psychoactive substance, can heal kidney infections.

Blake, however, stood by the unscientific claims made in the song, telling Rolling Stone that all the lyrics of "Peru Song" were true. She added, however, that these lyrics were not meant to influence her listeners towards such healing methods, insisting that her song was not meant to pressure anyone to avoid or replace clinically-approved methods of treating kidney infections, such as the use of antibiotics. "My music is for me, and I'm just putting it out", she told the magazine.

The Rolling Stone piece additionally debunked a popular but false rumor that her father was employed at the well-known weapons manufacturer Lockheed Martin.
