= Mark Blake =

Mark Blake may refer to:

- Mark Blake (Australian rules footballer) (born 1985)
- Mark Blake (footballer, born 1967), English footballer
- Mark Blake (footballer, born 1970), English footballer
- Mark Blake (writer) (fl. 2000s), British writer
- Mark Blake (politician) (died 1886), Member of Parliament for Mayo
