= Norman Blake =

Norman Blake may refer to:

- Norman Blake (American musician) (born 1938), American folk & bluegrass instrumentalist and vocalist
- Norman Blake (Scottish musician) (born 1965), Scottish rock musician who is a member of Teenage Fanclub
- Norman Blake (academic) (1934–2012), British academic and scholar of Middle English and Early Modern English language and literature
