= E. E. Blake =

British businessperson, Chairman of Kodak UK (1879–1961)

Ernest Edgar Blake
- Ernie Blake
- Born: 1879; Bedford, England
- Died: 1961 (aged 81–82); Bedford, England
- Education: Bedford Modern School
- Occupation: Chairman of Kodak (UK)

Ernest Edgar Blake (1879–1961) was a pioneering exhibitor of motion pictures, Chairman of Kodak UK and responsible for all Kodak cine film sales in Britain, Europe and most of the British Empire for over twenty years.

== Early life ==
Blake was born in Bedford in 1879, the son of William Blake who had moved to Bedford to manage a photographic business, and Annie Blake, a talented photographer. When he left Bedford Modern School in 1895 'his form master reportedly told him that he was a lazy, talkative, brainless youth who will never be any good'.

== Career ==
Blake followed his brother Bill into their father's business and 'the brothers worked together as lanternists for lecturers and lime-light operators for theatrical productions and concert parties'.

Annie Blake encouraged Blake and his brother to take up cinematography which had been pioneered in London and Paris in the late 1880s. From 1897 the Blake brothers 'developed a travelling picture show using first their own animatograph and then a gas-illuminated projector which they used to transport around Bedfordshire villages using a pony and trap'. He was showing motion pictures to audiences as early as 1897.

Eastman Kodak, the US film and camera company, started to set up a network of shops throughout the UK where Blake and his father were already stockists. In 1903, Blake joined Kodak Ltd. as a demonstrator and salesman.

In 1911, Blake became general manager of the Kodak cinematographic film department. When called to service during World War I, Blake was mainly commissioned in the RAF to work on aerial photographic duties.

After the war, Blake became European and Overseas manager for Kodak. By that time, motion picture film had become a major source of revenue for Kodak and Blake visited film studios around the world. In 1946, Blake was made Chairman of Kodak UK overseeing a major expansion of the company in the UK and Europe; he became semi-retired at age 75 but remained a consultant and did not finally resign his directorship until he was 80.

The Blake brothers were founder members of the Cinema Veterans’ Association in 1924 and both were later presidents. Blake played a prominent part in the Kinematograph Manufacturers' Association and the British Kinematograph Society and the Society of Motion Picture and Television Engineers. He later became a member of the Cinema Consultative Committee.

== Family life ==
Blake, who had a continuing interest in Bedfordshire cricket, played water polo in his early years and would be closely associated with rugby throughout his life, being President of Bedford RUFC from 1938 until his death. Blake died in Bedford in 1961 and was survived by his wife Louise and only son George Sidney William Blake.

Blake, 'a cheerful and forceful pioneer in photography' and 'one of the most influential men in the world's film industry,' was widely known as 'a colourful personality...a rugged and earthy character given to strong views and prejudices', famous for his after-dinner speeches with stories from the film business; he was said to be able to mix with anybody. His funeral was attended by Lord Morrison of Lambeth, then chairman of the British Board of Film Censors, and many others from the worlds of photography, cinematography and sport.
