= Will Blake =

American painter

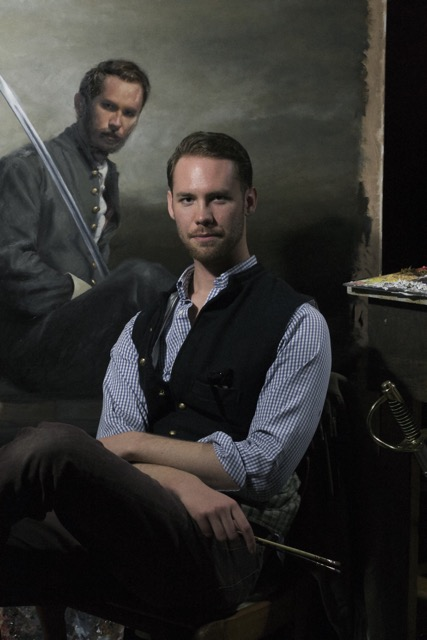
- Will Blake
- Born: 1991 (age 34–35); Oshkosh, WI, United States
- Education: University of Illinois Urbana-Champaign, Florence Academy of Art, Glasgow School of Art
- Known for: Painting, American Civil War reenactment
- Website: https://www.williamblakeart.com/

Will Blake (born 1991) is an American painter best known for his representations of American Civil War reenactment.

== Education ==
He studied at the Florence Academy of Art in the summer of 2012, the Glasgow School of Art in the spring of 2013 and graduated from the University of Illinois Urbana-Champaign BFA painting program in 2014.

== Career ==
His exhibition with artist Sean Tierney at Figure One, titled "Between the States" was his first showing of his Civil War reenactment work.
