= Tony Blake =

Tony Blake may refer to:

- Tony Blake (racing driver) (1929–2003), Canadian-British modified racing driver
- Tony Blake (English footballer) (1927–2014), Birmingham City and Gillingham player
- Tony Blake (Gaelic footballer) (born c. 1971/2), Donegal player
