= Dominick Blake (priest) =

Dominick Edward Blake (1806 – 29 June 1859) was born in Ireland, was a Church of England clergyman who, along with the rest of the family, emigrated to Upper Canada in 1832.

He had a successful career and was instrumental in formation of synod policies and procedures that defined the Church in Canada. He wrote at least one position that balanced a report by James Beaven. The quality of his ministry, and others like him, ensured the successful transfer of a European institution to Canada.
