= Bruce Blake (judge) =

American judge (1881–1957)

- Born: February 17, 1881; Danville, Indiana
- Died: January 6, 1957 (aged 75); Washington, D.C.

Bruce Blake (February 17, 1881 – January 6, 1957) was a justice of the Washington Supreme Court from 1932 to 1946.

Born in Danville, Indiana, Blake was brought to Spokane, Washington, as a child, and after graduating from the University of Michigan in 1905, entered the practice of law in Spokane. In 1912 he was elected as a Washington Superior Court judge at the age of 31, then the youngest person ever elected to that office. He was reelected in 1916 and 1920, and in 1932 was elected to the state supreme court.

Blake died in Washington, D.C., at the age of 75, while visiting his daughter who lived there. His funeral was held in that city, and his body was then returned to Spokane for burial.

Political offices
Preceded by Henry E. T. Herman	Justice of the Washington Supreme Court; 1932–1946	Succeeded by Edgar W. Schwellenbach
