= Harold Henry Blake =

Major-General Harold Henry Blake OBE
- Born: 1 August 1883; Great Yarmouth
- Died: 14 October 1960 (aged 77)
- Education: Framlingham College; University of Durham
- Military career
- Allegiance: United Kingdom
- Branch: British Army
- Service years: 1908–1943
- Rank: Major-General
- Unit: Royal Army Medical Corps
- Conflicts: First World War; Western Front; Second World War
- Awards: Mentioned in dispatches x 2

Harold Henry Blake OBE (1 August 1883 – 1960) was a British Army medical officer.

Blake was born in Great Yarmouth, with doctors on both sides of his family, and was educated at Framlingham College. He graduated from the University of Durham and entered the Royal Army Medical Corps in 1908, going on to be a surgeon at the Cancer Hospital, Brompton. During the First World War he served in France and Belgium. Between the wars, he served in East Asia, including periods in China and Hong Kong.

In 1943, Blake became the Superintendent of Stoke Mandeville Hospital, where he came into contact with the pioneering orthopaedic specialist Ludwig Guttmann. Under their management, the treatment of patients with spinal injuries was revolutionised.

Major-General Blake appears as a character in the BBC's 2012 production, The Best of Men, played by Nicholas Jones.
