= M. Brian Blake =

American computer scientist

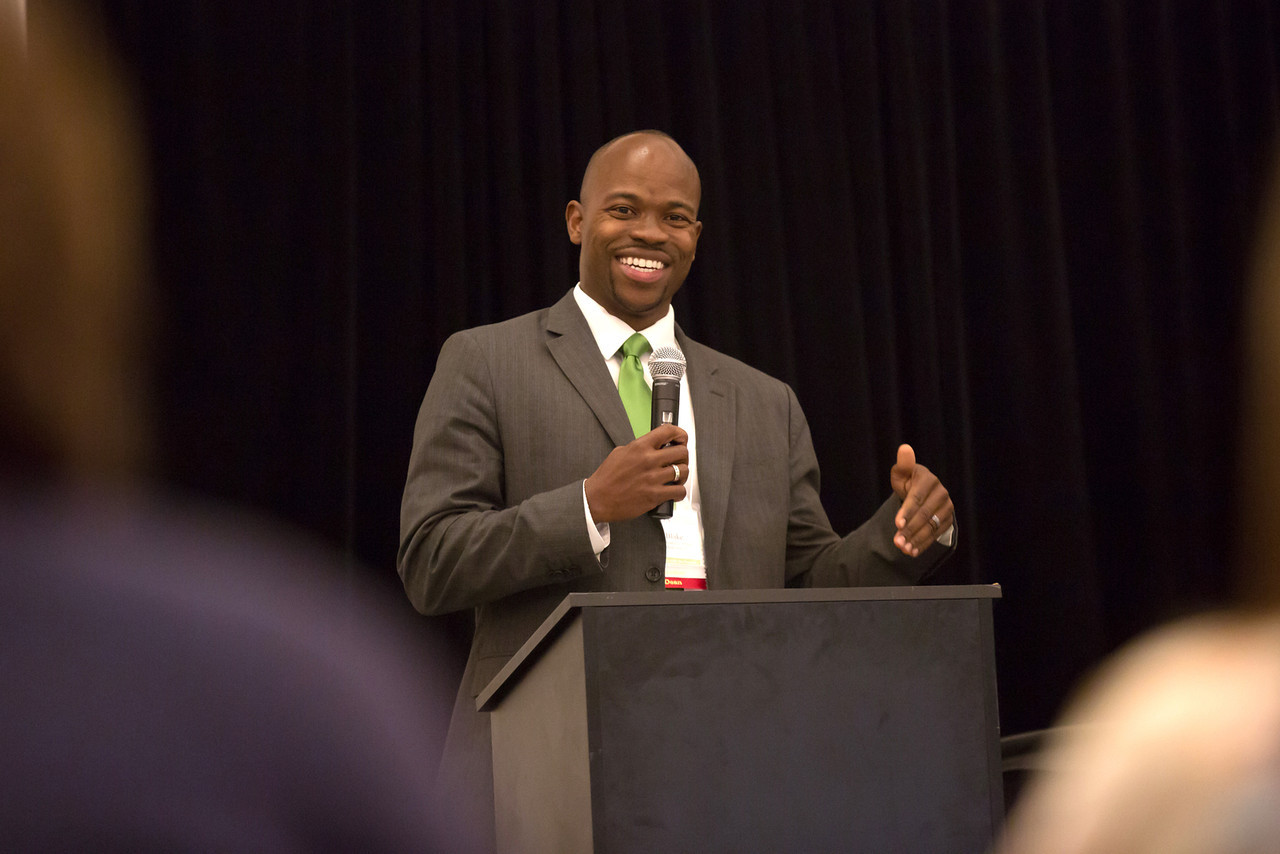

8th President of Georgia State University
- Incumbent
- Assumed office August 9, 2021
- Preceded by: Mark Becker

Personal details
- Born: October 13, 1971 (age 55) Savannah, Georgia, U.S.
- Education: Georgia Institute of Technology (BEE); Mercer University (MS); George Mason University (PhD)
- Scientific career
- Fields: Computer science
- Workplaces: Georgia State University; George Washington University; Drexel University; University of Miami; University of Notre Dame; Georgetown University
- Thesis: Agent-based workflow modeling for distributed component configuration and coordination (2000)
- Doctoral advisor: Hassan Gomaa

M. Brian Blake (born October 13, 1971) is an American computer scientist and software engineer who has been serving as the 8th president of Georgia State University since August 2021.

Blake previously served as the executive vice president for academic affairs and provost at George Washington University; executive vice president of academic affairs and the Nina Henderson Provost at Drexel University; the dean of the graduate school and vice provost for academic affairs at the University of Miami; an associate dean for research and professor at the College of Engineering at the University of Notre Dame; and department chair and professor of computer science at Georgetown University. Blake is also an ACM Distinguished Scientist and a Fellow of the IEEE.

== Early life and education ==
Born in 1971, Brian Blake was raised in Savannah, Georgia, where he spent much of his life as a young adult before going on to graduate from Benedictine Military School in 1989.

Blake continued his education at Georgia Institute of Technology, graduating in 1994 with a bachelor’s degree in electrical engineering. Just a few years later in 1997, Blake received a master’s in electrical engineering with a minor in software engineering from Mercer University. He received his doctoral degree from George Mason University in 2000.

== Career ==
Blake embraced his passion for computer science from the very beginning, working as a software architect, technical lead and expert developer with General Electric (GE), Lockheed Martin, General Dynamics, and The Mitre Corporation.

In 1999, Blake joined the computer science department at Georgetown University as an adjunct professor. There, he spent 10 years of his career, achieving promotion from adjunct professor to assistant professor and then to associate professor with tenure. Blake was soon selected to serve as chair of the Department of Computer Science and the inaugural director of graduate studies in computer science. In 2007, Blake made history at Georgetown University by becoming the first African-American to chair the computer science department, a milestone across all majors at the institution.

Blake spent much of his early career on the East Coast. In 2009, he ventured west to join the University of Notre Dame as Associate Dean of Engineering for Research and Graduate Studies, and as professor of computer science and engineering. His role included faculty development, student recruitment and diversity strategies, and working with corporate and foundation partners. In 2012, Blake was named vice provost for academic affairs and dean of the Graduate School at the University of Miami.

On August 1, 2015, Blake became the provost and executive vice president for academic affairs at Drexel University. During his first four years at Drexel, he oversaw the hire of 10 Deans and more than 75 faculty, while simultaneously increasing the diversity of administrative offices. Blake's leadership of academic space planning led to new facilities for the College of Computing and Informatics and the School of Education. Blake oversaw the creation of several contemporary centers, including the Fabric Discovery Center. the Weight, Eating, and Lifestyle Science (WELL) Center and the university's new Teaching and Learning Center. In 2017, Blake was named the Nina Henderson Provost which recognized and enabled his central programs that enhanced interdisciplinary initiatives across the institution. He conceived programs such as Drexel Areas of Research Excellence (DARE) and Market-Driven Academic Program Ventures (MPV) which have been credited with helping enhance research and graduate education, respectively. He also oversaw the creation of the Drexel Business Solutions Institute and the Experiential Edge program, which extended Drexel's mission for experiential learning. Under Blake's oversight as Chief Academic Officer, Drexel had its highest retention rate the highest overall research activity in history, and the university received its first-ever Carnegie Classification as a R1 Doctoral University: Very High Research Activity.

In November 2019, Blake joined George Washington University (GWU) as its provost and executive vice president for academic affairs. He joined GWU’s President Thomas LeBlanc's team just after the university announced a controversial new strategy of cutting undergraduate enrollment and after GWU’s U.S. News rank dropped 14 points in the previous two years. During his term, Blake reversed this trend by 7 points leading the university to an overall U.S. News National ranking of 63.

He led the creation of several academic planning initiatives to consider future enrollments, virtual instruction, and a decentralized model to evolve the university’s research infrastructure. Blake also led an initiative to meet the full need of Pell-eligible students at GWU beginning in Fall 2021. During his time as Provost, Blake was also on the short list to become president of the University of Rhode Island.

On June 17, 2021, Blake became the eighth president of Georgia State University and the institution's first African-American president. In his first two years in this position, Blake helped acquire nearly $100 million in capital project appropriations, including a new research tower and a fully-electric bus fleet. In early 2023, Blake oversaw a $15 million gift from The Starr Foundation to Georgia State’s business school. The school is now named Maurice R. Greenberg School of Risk Science after Maurice R. Greenberg, chairman and CEO of Starr Insurance, Co. In November 2023, Blake announced the development of the university’s new comprehensive strategic plan, Blueprint to 2033: Our Place, Our Time.

During his time at GSU, Blake has had a significant impact on the evolution of buildings and facilities. In November 2023, the university’s safety plan was announced. Blake led the development of this multi-year campus and public realm improvement plan, including the GSU Blueline, in partnership with the City of Atlanta, Georgia Power, and local businesses/apartment complexes, that continues to enhance the student experience, safety, and security of the university. Blake also worked with the State of Georgia and led the facilities development for the university to open its new $6.3 million dental hygiene clinic in September 2024.

In May 2024, it was announced that a new 1,000-seat baseball stadium was approved to begin construction. Blake has partnered with the athletic leadership at Georgia State University to develop the facility in the downtown, Summerhill area of the campus in time for the 2026 College baseball season.

On November 12, 2024, Blake announced Georgia State University received an $80 million gift from the Woodruff Foundation, which is the largest in the university's 111-year history and the largest among institutions in the University System of Georgia. The gift funding nine different revitalization projects to “create a college town downtown” targets completion by June 2026 and in time for the FIFA World Cup 2026.

== Personal life ==
Blake is married to Dr. Bridget Blake, a mechanical engineer who now serves as a consultant for The Mitre Corporation. The couple has two sons together, Brendan Blake and Bryce Blake.

Academic offices
Preceded by Mark Becker	8th President of Georgia State University; 2021–	Succeeded by
