= George S. Blake =

- Born: March 5, 1802; Worcester, Massachusetts, U.S.
- Died: June 24, 1871 (aged 69); Longwood, Massachusetts, U.S.
- Military career
- Allegiance: United States
- Branch: United States Navy
- Service years: 1818 - 1871
- Rank: Commodore
- Commands: Superintendent of the United States Naval Academy

George Smith Blake (March 5, 1802 – June 24, 1871) was a commodore in the United States Navy. He was Superintendent of the United States Naval Academy in Annapolis, Maryland (and Newport, R.I. During the Civil War) from September 15, 1857 to September 9, 1865. The USC&GS George S. Blake was named in his honor.

He was elected a member of the American Antiquarian Society in 1859.
