= Blake =

Blake or Blake's may refer to:

== People ==
- Blake (given name), a given name of English origin (includes a list of people with the name)
- Blake (surname), a surname of English origin (includes a list of people with the name)
  - William Blake (1757–1827), English poet, painter, and printmaker

== Places ==
- Blake, Kentucky, USA
- Blake Basin, a deep area of the Atlantic Ocean
- Blake Island, Washington, USA, in Puget Sound
- Blake River Megacaldera Complex, a large cluster of volcanoes in Ontario and Quebec, Canada
- Blake's Pools, a nature reserve in south west England, UK

== Art, entertainment, and media ==
=== Fictional characters ===
- Blake Belladonna, a character of the web series RWBY
- Anita Blake, a character, protagonist of the Anita Blake: Vampire Hunter series of books by Laurell K. Hamilton
- Bellamy Blake, fictional character in The 100 TV series
- Bob Blake, a character in a series African American westerns from the 1930s played by Herb Jeffries
- Daphne Blake, fictional character from Scooby-Doo
- Henry Blake (M*A*S*H), a character from M*A*S*H franchise
- Captain J.F. Blake, the main protagonist in the 2002 video game sequel to The Thing
- Katherine Blake (character), killer on the soap opera Shortland Street
- Nicholas Blake (Spooks), a character in the TV series Spooks
- Octavia Blake, a character in The 100 TV series
- Peter Blake (Days of Our Lives), a character in the American soap opera Days of Our Lives
- Robert Harrison Blake, a character created by H. P. Lovecraft
- Roj Blake, a character from the television serial Blake's 7
- Sexton Blake, a fictional detective for multiple authors
- William Blake, a character in the film Dead Man
- Blake Bradley, a Navy Thunder Ranger from the TV series Power Rangers Ninja Storm
- Blake Carrington, an oil tycoon from the TV series Dynasty
- Blake Oakfield, a surf gangster from the TV series Angry Boys
- Lucien Blake (character), lead character in The Doctor Blake Mysteries
- Lance Corporal Thomas "Tom" Blake, main character in the 2019 war film 1917
- Earl Talbot Blake, a character played by John Lithgow in the 1991 movie Ricochet

=== Music ===
- Blake (band), a classical crossover all-male singing trio
- Blake Babies, alternative rock band

=== Other art, entertainment, and media ===
- Blake (film), a documentary film by Bill Mason
- Blake (monologue), by Elliot Hayes
- Andy Blake, series of books by Edward Edson Lee
- Blake's 7, a British science fiction television series

== Brands and enterprises ==
- Blake, Cassels & Graydon, Canadian law firm
- Blake rifle
- Blake's Lotaburger, fast food chain in New Mexico, USA
- The Blake School (disambiguation), a set of schools

== Other uses ==
- BLAKE (hash function), a cryptographic hash function
- Blake baronets, three baronetcies in Ireland, Great Britain and the UK
- Blake's hitch, a friction hitch used in tree climbing
- Blake Plateau, a relatively shallow platform off the coast of the southeastern United States
- Blake's Pride, a pear cultivar developed in the United States in 1965 and introduced in 1998
- Blake Transit Center, a public transit hub in Ann Arbor, USA, often referred to as "The Blake"

== See also ==
- Blake House (disambiguation)
