= Admiral Sands =

Admiral Sands may refer to:

- Benjamin F. Sands (1811–1883), U.S. Navy rear admiral
- James H. Sands (1845–1911), U.S. Navy rear admiral
- Joshua R. Sands (1795–1883), U.S. Navy rear admiral
- Milton Sands III (fl. 1990s–2020s), U.S. Navy rear admiral
