= USS Sands =

Two ships in the United States Navy have been named USS Sands for Benjamin F. Sands and his son, James H. Sands.

- The first USS Sands (DD-243/APD-13) was a Clemson-class destroyer, commissioned in 1920 and decommissioned in 1945.
- The second USNS Sands (T-AGOR-6) was placed in service in 1965, struck in 1990 and sold to Brazil.
