= USNS Sands =

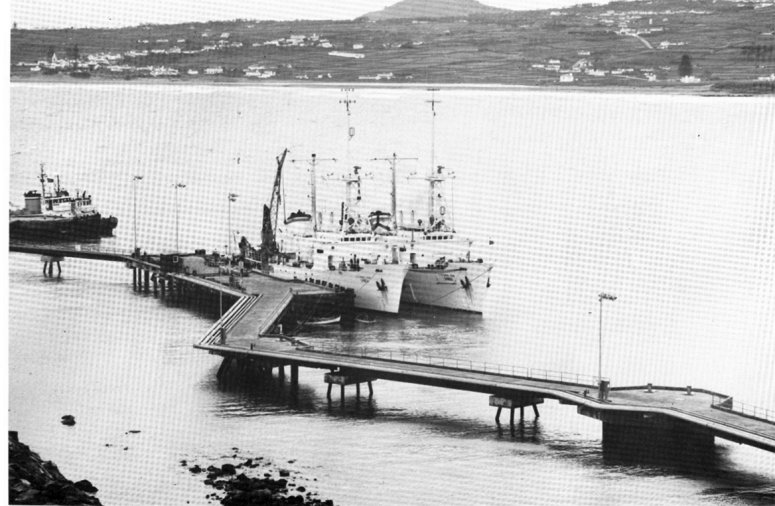
- USNS Sands pierside, outboard of USNS Lynch

History

United States
- Name: Sands
- Namesake: Rear Admiral Benjamin F. Sands and his son Rear Admiral James H. Sands
- Builder: Marietta Manufacturing. Company, Point Pleasant, West Virginia
- Yard number: 911
- Laid down: 23 August 1962
- Launched: 14 September 1963
- Sponsored by: Miss Priscilla G. Sands
- Acquired: 2 February 1965
- In service: 2 February 1965
- Out of service: 1973
- Identification: T-AGOR-6
- Fate: transferred to Brazil, 5 December 1990
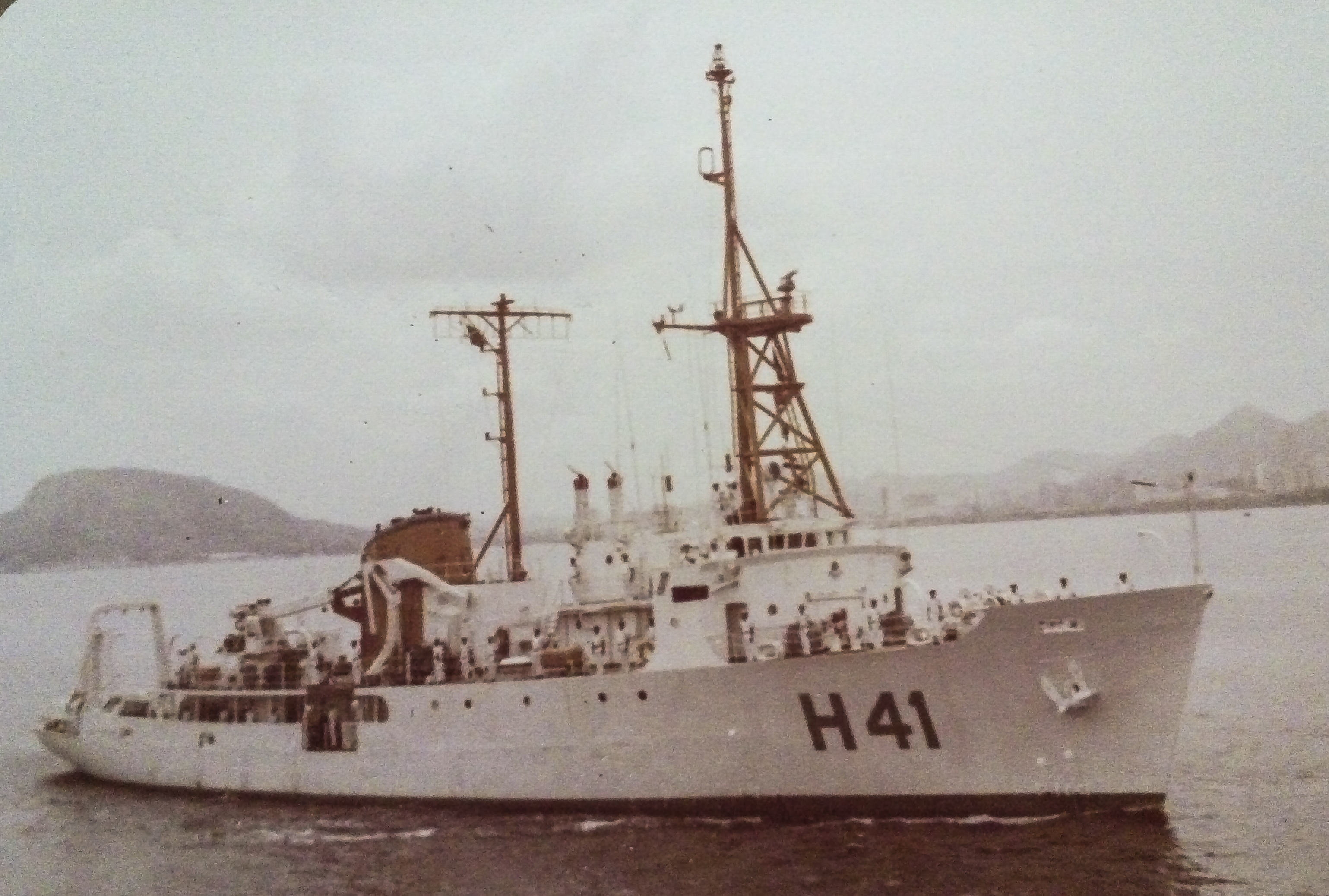
- Almirante Câmara in 1974

Brazil
- Name: Almirante Camara
- Namesake: Admiral Antônio Alves Câmara Junior
- Acquired: 1 July 1974 (Lease); 5 December 1990 (Purchase)
- Commissioned: 1 July 1974
- Decommissioned: 7 August 2003
- Identification: Pennant number: H41; IMO number: 8332112
- Fate: Sold at auction 2004

General characteristics
- Class & type: Robert D. Conrad-class oceanographic research ship
- Displacement: 1,200 tons; 1,370 tons
- Length: 209 ft (63.7 m)
- Beam: 40 ft (12.2 m)
- Draft: 16 ft (4.9 m)
- Propulsion: Diesel-electric, single propeller, 2,500 shp (1,900 kW), retractable azimuth-compensating bow thruster
- Speed: 12 knots (22 km/h; 14 mph)
- Complement: 23 civilian mariners, 38 scientists

USNS Sands (T-AGOR-6) was a Robert D. Conrad-class oceanographic research ship operated by the Military Sealift Command (MSC) for the Naval Oceanographic Office from 1965 to 1973. During that period she provided ocean-bottom information and underwater test data to the U.S. Navy and other U.S. agencies. The ship was the second naval vessel to be named for Rear Admiral Benjamin F. Sands and his son Rear Admiral James H. Sands, the first being the destroyer Sands (DD-243). The ship operated in the Atlantic on oceanographic and geophysical assignments for the Oceanographic Office and other agencies.

In 1974 the ship was leased to Brazil, renamed Almirante Camara and in 1990 Brazil purchased the ship under the Security Assistance Program. Almirante Camara was engaged in oceanographic work for Brazil in the South Atlantic until retirement in 2003.

== Construction ==
Sands was laid down on 23 August 1962 by the Marietta Manufacturing Co. of Point Pleasant, West Virginia as hull number 911, the first of three such vessels built for the United States Navy by the builder. (Note: Hull 912 was USNS Lynch and hull 913 was USNS Kellar.) The ship was launched on 14 September 1963; sponsored by Miss Priscilla G. Sands; and accepted by the Navy and placed in service with the then Military Sea Transportation Service (MSTS) on 2 February 1965, Capt. George W. Fladerer, Master.

== Naval Oceanographic Office service ==
Manned by a Civil Service crew, the United States Naval Ship Sands was operated in the Atlantic Ocean by the Military Sealift Command (formerly MSTS) for the Naval Oceanographic Office. The ship was operated by that office as one of the "Navy Pool" vessels for which the office coordinated use by Navy laboratories, universities and research organizations with Navy contracts for varied projects. (Note: The referenced report lists the organizations using the Navy Pool T-AGORs during the covered period and the pool ships: James M. Gilliss, Charles H. Davis, Sands, Lynch, De Steiguer, and Bartlett.)

Until being placed out of service, in reserve, in April 1973, Sands performed oceanographic and marine geophysical research and conducted experiments in underwater sound propagation. For example, in the early 1970s Sands planted large vertical subsurface acoustic arrays in the tropical Atlantic. These arrays were unique for having long term recording capabilities enabling months' long acoustic data to be collected; and for the first use of the then new material Kevlar as the strength member of the arrays. Kevlar, created by DuPont for use as cords in vehicular tires, was found to have stretch characteristics that matched those of the conductive copper wires embedded in an array. (Whereas a material like dacron can stretch upwards 50% before breaking, kevlar limits stretch to 2% before failure. This greatly reduced longitudinal stresses on the copper wires and permitted precise vertical positioning of hydrophones in the vertical string.) Sands, during this period, also conducted acoustic data collection voyages in the area around Malta and the lower Adriatic Sea.

Sands was placed out of service in 1973.

== Transfer to Brazil ==
On 1 July 1974 the ship was leased by Brazil, renamed Almirante Camara, after a major supporter of Brazilian hydrography, Admiral Antônio Alves Câmara Junior, and placed in service under the command of Captain-de-frigate Fernando Carlos Catta Preta Baumeir. In 1990 an agreement was signed for purchase of the ship by Brazil at the end of the lease. The purchase was effective under the Security Assistance Program 5 December 1990. Almirante Camara engaged in survey work in the South Atlantic for Brazil, including international operations with U.S. Naval research and hydrographic vessels such as Hayes and Robert D. Conrad and in support of the Brazilian Antarctic Program.

Almirante Camara decommissioned 7 August 2003 at a ceremony at the Naval Base, Rio de Janeiro and sold at auction in 2004.
