= USNS James M. Gilliss =

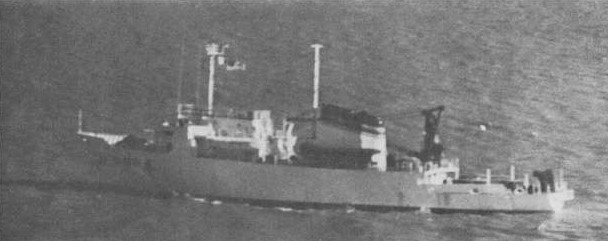
- USNS James M. Gilliss (AGOR-4) on 14 December 1962

History

United States
- Name: James M. Gilliss
- Namesake: James Melville Gilliss, born 6 September 1811 in the District of Columbia
- Builder: Christy Corporation, Sturgeon Bay, Wisconsin
- Laid down: 31 May 1961
- Launched: 19 May 1962
- Sponsored by: Mrs. Hubert H. Humphrey, wife of the Senator from Minnesota
- Acquired: by the U.S. Navy, 5 October 1962
- In service: 5 November 1962 as USNS James M. Gilliss (T-AGOR-4)
- Out of service: 1980
- Identification: IMO number: 7338339

History

Mexico
- Name: 1983-2023 ARM Altair; from 2023 ARM Sayulita
- In service: 15 June 1983. Loaned to Mexico 15 June 1983, sold to Mexico 4 December 1996 under the Security Assistance Act.
- Identification: Pennant number: BI-03
- Status: Operational 2023
- Notes: Based Manzanillo, Colima

General characteristics
- Type: Robert D. Conrad class oceanographic research ship
- Displacement: 1,200 tons light; 1,370 tons full load
- Length: 209 ft (64 m)
- Beam: 40 ft (12 m)
- Draft: 16 ft (4.9 m)
- Propulsion: diesel-electric, single propeller, 2,500shp, retractable azimuth-compensating bow thruster
- Speed: 12 knots
- Complement: 23 civilian mariners, 38 scientists
- Armament: None

USNS James M. Gilliss (T-AGOR-4) was a Robert D. Conrad-class oceanographic research ship acquired by the U.S. Navy in 1962. The ship was operated by the Military Sea Transportation Service (MSTS now MSC) and managed by the Naval Oceanographic Office as one of the "Navy Pool" vessels serving various Navy laboratories and projects in the Atlantic Ocean. After active Navy pool service the ship was assigned to the University of Miami to operate as part of the University-National Oceanographic Laboratory System (UNOLS) fleet until 1979.

James M. Gilliss was loaned to the Mexican Navy in June 1983 as an oceanographic research ship to become ARM Altair (BI-03). Mexico bought the ship December 1996 under the Security Assistance Act. In 2023 she was renamed ARM Sayulita (BI-03)

== Built in Sturgeon Bay, Wisconsin ==
The second ship to be so named by the Navy, James M. Gilliss (T-AGOR-4) was laid down by Christy Corporation, Sturgeon Bay, Wisconsin, 31 May 1961; launched 19 May 1962; sponsored by Mrs. Hubert H. Humphrey, wife of the Senator from Minnesota; delivered to the Navy 5 October 1962; and turned over to the Military Sea Transportation Service (MSTS) 5 November 1962, Captain Torston Johnson in command.

== Naval Oceanographic Office service ==
The ship was by operated by the Military Sea Transportation Service (MSTS) and managed by the Oceanographic Office as one of the "Navy Pool" vessels for which the office coordinated use by Navy laboratories, universities and research organizations with Navy contracts for varied projects. (Note: The referenced report lists the organizations using the Navy Pool T-AGORs during the covered period and the pool ships: James M. Gilliss, Charles H. Davis, Sands, Lynch, De Steiguer, and Bartlett.)

In addition to the latest in oceanographic and meteorological equipment, she also possessed unusual design features, including special antiroll tanks for stability and a retractable bow propulsion propeller. As a mobile, floating research laboratory, she was capable of carrying out experiments in sound transmission, underwater life, and ocean floor characteristics, thus enabling her to help continue the Navy's lead in the exploration and understanding of "inner space."

=== Searching for Thresher ===
Departing Sturgeon Bay 8 November, she arrived New York City 19 November for sea trials and shakedown. On 12 April 1963 she departed New York City to take part in the massive search for sunken submarine Thresher (SSN-593). Operating out of Boston, Massachusetts, she lent her "know-how" to this vital and difficult operation for 5 months before arriving Washington, D.C., 22 September. After returning to New London, Connecticut, for additional equipment tests, she departed 1 November for oceanographic research operations off Bermuda.

=== North Atlantic operations ===
During the next 4 months she operated in the Atlantic from the Bahamas to the New England coast. In March 1964 she steamed to the Caribbean for surveying and scientific work out of San Juan, Puerto Rico. Arriving Key West, Florida, 28 March, she operated from the Strait of Florida to the Bahamas and Bermuda for more than a year.

Departing Key West 23 May 1965, she arrived New York 27 May and prepared for deployment to waters off the British Isles. She sailed 14 June; arrived Belfast, Northern Ireland, 27 June; and began 3 months of research and survey operations from the British Isles and France to Newfoundland.

Departing Belfast 15 September, she returned to New London 6 October and resumed research operations off the U.S. East Coast, which have continued into 1967. She continued to operate in the Atlantic from New England to the Bahamas while supporting important surveys and scientific experiments of the Naval Oceanographic Office.

== University of Miami ==
The ship was reassigned to the University of Miami to replace the R/V Pillsbury, which was to be retired in summer of 1971, and operate as R/V James M. Gilliss, one of the Navy owned vessels of the University-National Oceanographic Laboratory System (UNOLS) fleet. As an example of work during this phase the ship, along with University of Miami's R/V Columbus Iselin was among other government and institutional ships taking part in the Global Atmospheric Research Program Atlantic Tropical Experiment in 1974. The ship went out of UNOLS service in 1979. Two new ships, ordered by the National Science Foundation and due for completion in June and September 1981 were to replace Duke University's R/V Eastward and University of Miami's R/V James M. Gilliss respectively.

== Navy inactivation ==
James M. Gilliss was placed out of service on an unspecified date. Between 18 March 1980 and 14 June 1983 the ship was in the custody of the United States Maritime Administration in the Beaumont, Texas reserve fleet.

== Mexican service ==
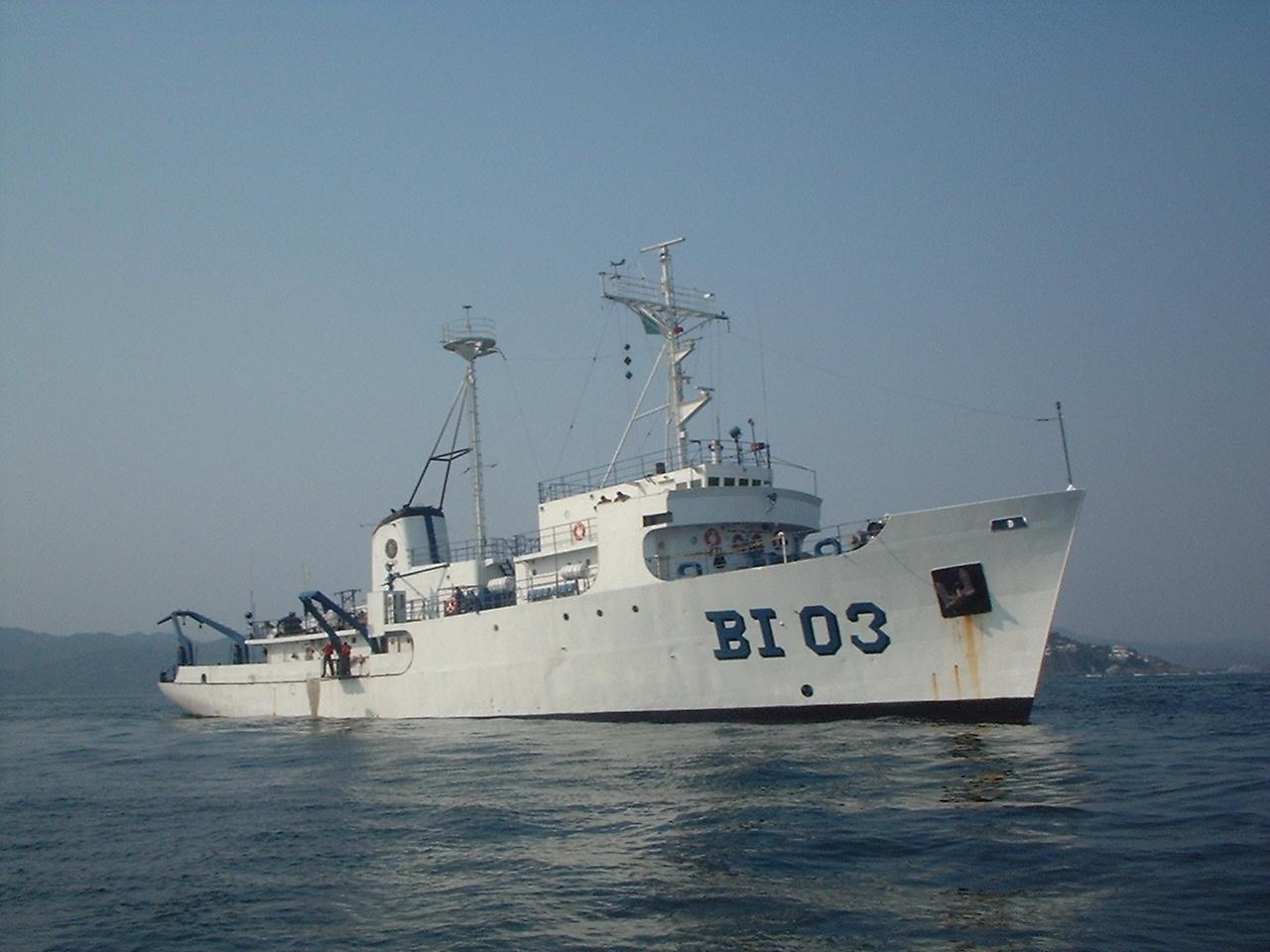
ARM Altair seen in 2005.

On 15 June 1983 the ship was loaned to Mexico to become the Buques de Investigación Oceanográfica ARM Altair (BI-03) surveying for the Mexican navy. Altair, along with ARM Antares (BI-04) (ex S. P. Lee (T-AGS-31)), are listed as operational in 2019 and based in Manzanillo, Colima. The ship was transferred to the Mexican Navy on 4 December 1996 under the Security Assistance Act. In 2023 she was renamed ARM Sayulita (BI-03).
