= USS Bartlett =

USS Bartlett may refer to the following ships operated by the United States Navy:

- USS W. L. Bartlett (1861), a schooner acquired by the United States Navy in 1861
- USNS Bartlett (T-AGOR-13), an oceanographic research vessel in United States Navy service from 1969 to 1993
