= USS Fort Jackson =

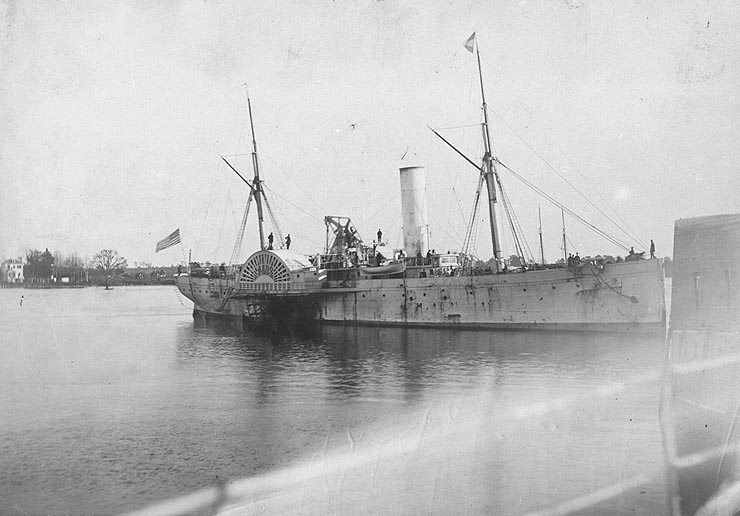
- Fort Jackson moored at Hampton Roads, Virginia, December 1864

History

United States
- Name: USS Fort Jackson
- Namesake: Fort Jackson, Louisiana
- Builder: Jeremiah Simonson
- Launched: 30 October 1862
- Commissioned: 18 August 1863
- Decommissioned: 7 August 1865
- Fate: Sold, 27 September 1865

United States
- Name: North America
- Owner: United States and Brazil Mail Steamship Company
- Identification: Official number 18303; Signal letters H.P.D.K
- Fate: Broken-up in 1879

General characteristics
- Type: Sidewheel steamer
- Displacement: 1,850 long tons (1,880 t)
- Length: 250 ft (76 m)
- Beam: 38 ft 6 in (11.73 m)
- Draft: 18 ft (5.5 m)
- Propulsion: Steam engine
- Speed: 14 knots (26 km/h; 16 mph)
- Armament: 1 × 100-pounder rifle; 2 × 30-pounder rifles; 8 × 9 in (230 mm) smoothbore guns

USS Fort Jackson was a wooden sidewheel steamer in the United States Navy during the American Civil War. She was successful in enforcing the Union blockade of Confederate ports, capturing five ships carrying contraband. She participated in the battles for Fort Fisher, which effectively closed the port of Wilmington, North Carolina to the Confederacy. Most notably, the surrender of Confederate forces in Texas was signed aboard the ship, formally ending the Civil War in that portion of the country.

After the war, she was sold by the Navy. Her new owners named her North America. She spent the rest of her career carrying passengers, cargo, and mail between New York and ports in Brazil. She was idled in 1872 in favor of more modern vessels, and was finally broken up in 1879.

== Construction and characteristics ==
In the mid-nineteenth century, Cornelius Vanderbilt developed a profitable trade route from New York to San Francisco. His ships sailed from New York to the Caribbean coast of Panama, and from the Pacific coast to San Francisco. Passengers and freight connected from one ocean to the other via the Panama Railroad. In 1862, Vanderbilt ordered the steamer Union from Jeremiah Simonson for one of the ocean-going legs of this route. Simonson built her at his Greenpoint, New York shipyard. She was launched on 30 October 1862. Her original cost was estimated to be $400,000.

Her hull was 250 feet (76 m) long, with a beam of 38 feet 6 inches (11.73 m), and a draft of 18 feet (5.5 m). She displaced 1,800 tons. Her depth of hold was 11 feet 7 inches (3.53 m).

She was propelled by her two side-mounted paddlewheels. These were turned by a single coal-fired walking-beam steam engine, which was built by the Neptune Iron Works. It had a single cylinder 80 inches (2.0 m) in diameter with a stroke of 12 feet (3.7 m). Steam was provided by four boilers, which were heated by fourteen furnaces.

It is not clear that Union ever sailed for Vanderbilt. As early as December 1862, before the ship was ready for sea, it was reported that he offered to sell her to the U.S. Government for $350,000.

== Civil War Service (1863–1865) ==
Vanderbilt's merchant ship Union was converted into the gunboat Fort Jackson at the Brooklyn Navy Yard. During her time at the Navy Yard she was fitted with eight 9-inch smooth-bore guns, two 30-pounder rifled guns, and a single 100-pounder Parrott rifle. The ship had to be renamed because the Navy already had a USS Union in service. Fort Jackson was named for the fortification on the Mississippi River that was taken by Flag Officer David Farragut on April 28, 1863.

During her period in the shipyard, a string of officers were appointed to her command, seemingly as an administrative convenience rather than because there was any sailing to be done. On 17 April 1863, Commander R. W. Shufeldt was ordered to take command of Fort Jackson. On 19 June 1863, Captain John Rogers was ordered to replace him. On 25 July 1863, Captain Henry A. Walke was placed in charge of the ship, and he had the honor of commissioning Fort Jackson on 18 August 1863. However, he was succeeded on 22 August 1863 by Captain James Alden and it was he who finally took her to sea.

On 2 September 1863 Fort Jackson departed New York for Fortress Monroe, where she arrived on 4 September. There she joined with steamer Connecticut in an attempt to intercept British arms shipments from Bermuda to Wilmington, North Carolina. She arrived at Bermuda on 10 September 1863, and indeed found a Confederate steamer, Ella and Annie, in St. Georges harbor. Fort Jackson lay off the island waiting for the Confederate steamer to sail, but was blown off station by a gale. Having survived the storm, the ship was damaged due to an error by of one of the ship's engineers. Second Assistant Engineer John T. Wilson was dismissed from the Navy for gross neglect of duty for burning out one of the ship's boilers. Fort Jackson limped into Fortress Monroe and was sent on to New York for permanent repairs. She arrived there on 21 September 1863.

In December 1863 Fort Jackson was assigned to the North Atlantic Blockading Squadron to cruise off the North Carolina coast. On 21 April 1864, Captain Benjamin F. Sands, her new commanding officer, organized a boat expedition in which her crew crossed the bar to Masonboro Sound, destroyed valuable salt works, and seized 56 prisoners.

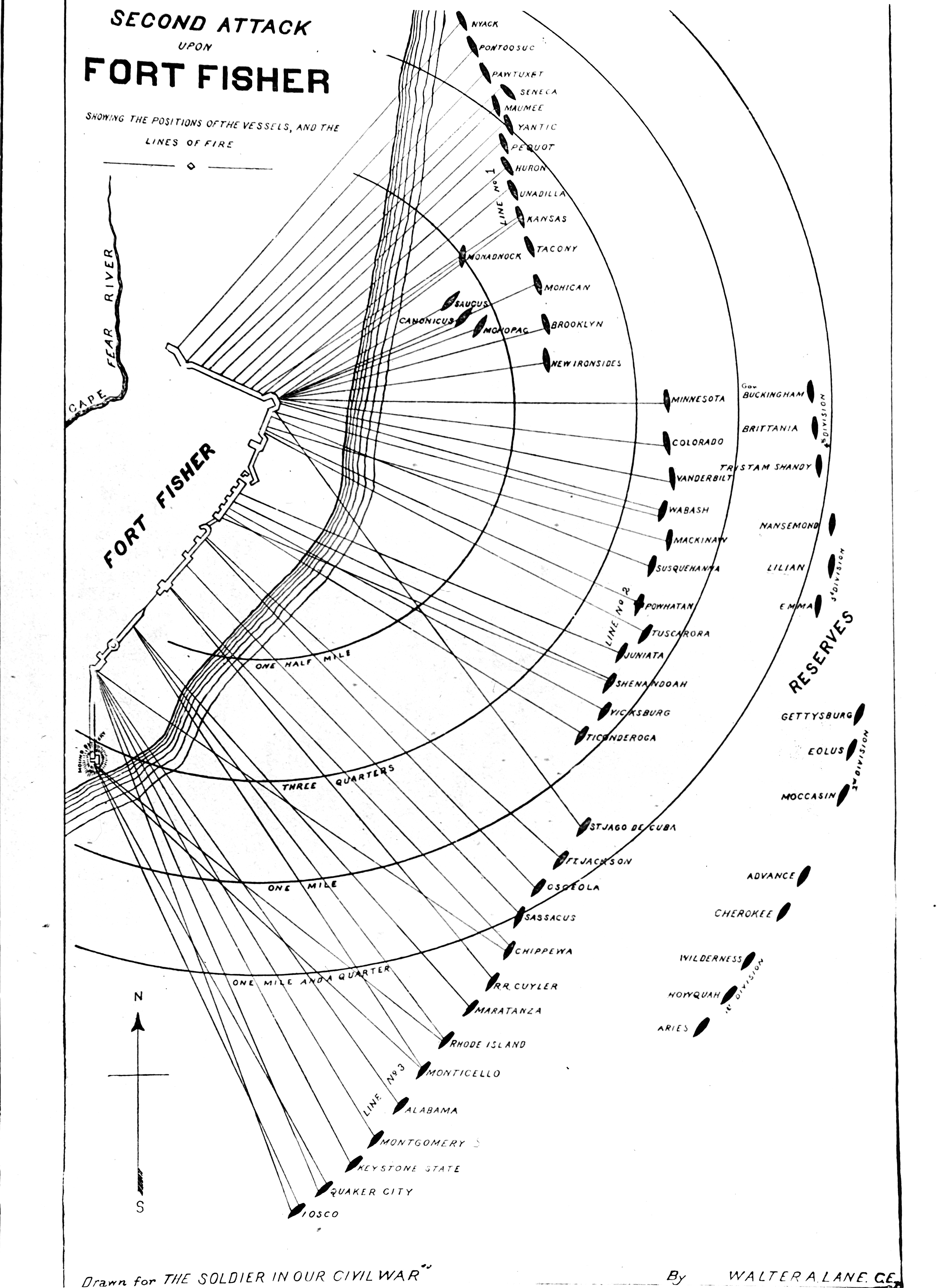
Bombardment of Fort Fisher, showing the position of Fort Jackson on 14 January 1865

Fort Jackson captured the blockade runner Thistle between Bermuda and Wilmington after a 6-hour chase in June 1864. While the ship was taken as a prize, most of her cargo had been thrown overboard during the chase. Fort Jackson captured the blockade runner Boston on 8 July 1864, off Wilmington. She had a cargo of 450 sacks of salt, 100 boxes of soap, and twenty four barrels of copperas. On 21 October she captured CSS Wando after a 5 1/2 hour chase. The blockade runner left Wilmington for Nassau with a cargo of 600 bales of cotton, but managed to throw about 50 overboard during the chase.

In late 1864, the ship was reassigned from blockade duty to support Rear Admiral David Dixon Porter in his efforts to capture Fort Fisher at the mouth of the Cape Fear River. As part of Porter's fleet, on 24 December 1864, the ship bombarded the fort. The next day, Christmas, Fort Jackson was converted into a hospital ship; small boats transferred her ammunition to Susquehanna. It is not documented why Fort Jackson was selected for this service, but it is likely that the quality of the ship's surgeon, Phillip S. Wales, played a role. He was recognized at the time as a superior medical professional, and ultimately rose to become Surgeon General of the United States Navy. During this first assault, naval gunfire silenced Fort Fisher's guns, but the landing force was unable to take the bastion and was withdrawn. Porter's fleet, including Fort Jackson, sailed back to Fortress Monroe to resupply.

Porter immediately began work on a new invasion plan, this time with a different army general. Porter's fleet got underway from Fortress Monroe on January 12, 1865. Fort Jackson towed the monitor Mahopac back to the fort. By 11 pm on 13 January 1865, the fleet had once again anchored off of Fort Fisher. The bombardment of shore facilities, in which Fort Jackson participated, began at dawn on the 14th. Fort Jackson was the second ship in "line of battle No. 3", which shelled the southeast face of Fort Fisher. On 15 January 1865, the army landed troops to the north of the fort, and Fort Jackson's division provided a creeping bombardment in front of them as they advanced to the south. Fort Fisher was taken but the victory was hard fought; Fort Jackson suffered five men wounded badly enough to be admitted to hospital.

After the successful operation against Fort Fisher, on 1 February 1865, Fort Jackson was transferred to the West Gulf Blockading Squadron. She underwent repair at Pensacola, Florida, and took up station on the Texas coast. There, off Galveston, she aided steamer Cornubia in capturing the schooner Chaos on 21 April 1865. She captured the blockade runner Denbigh on 24 May 1865. Confederate Major Generals E. Kirby Smith and J. B. Magruder met with Union Brigadier General E. J. Davis aboard Fort Jackson on 2 June 1865 and signed the formal surrender of Confederate forces in Texas, ending the Civil War in that portion of the country.

Fort Jackson returned to New York via Pensacola on 29 July 1865 with Captain Sands still in command. She was decommissioned there on 7 August 1865 and sold at auction on 27 September 1865. She was bought by William H. Starbuck for $108,000.

== United States and Brazil Mail Steamship Company (1865–1879) ==
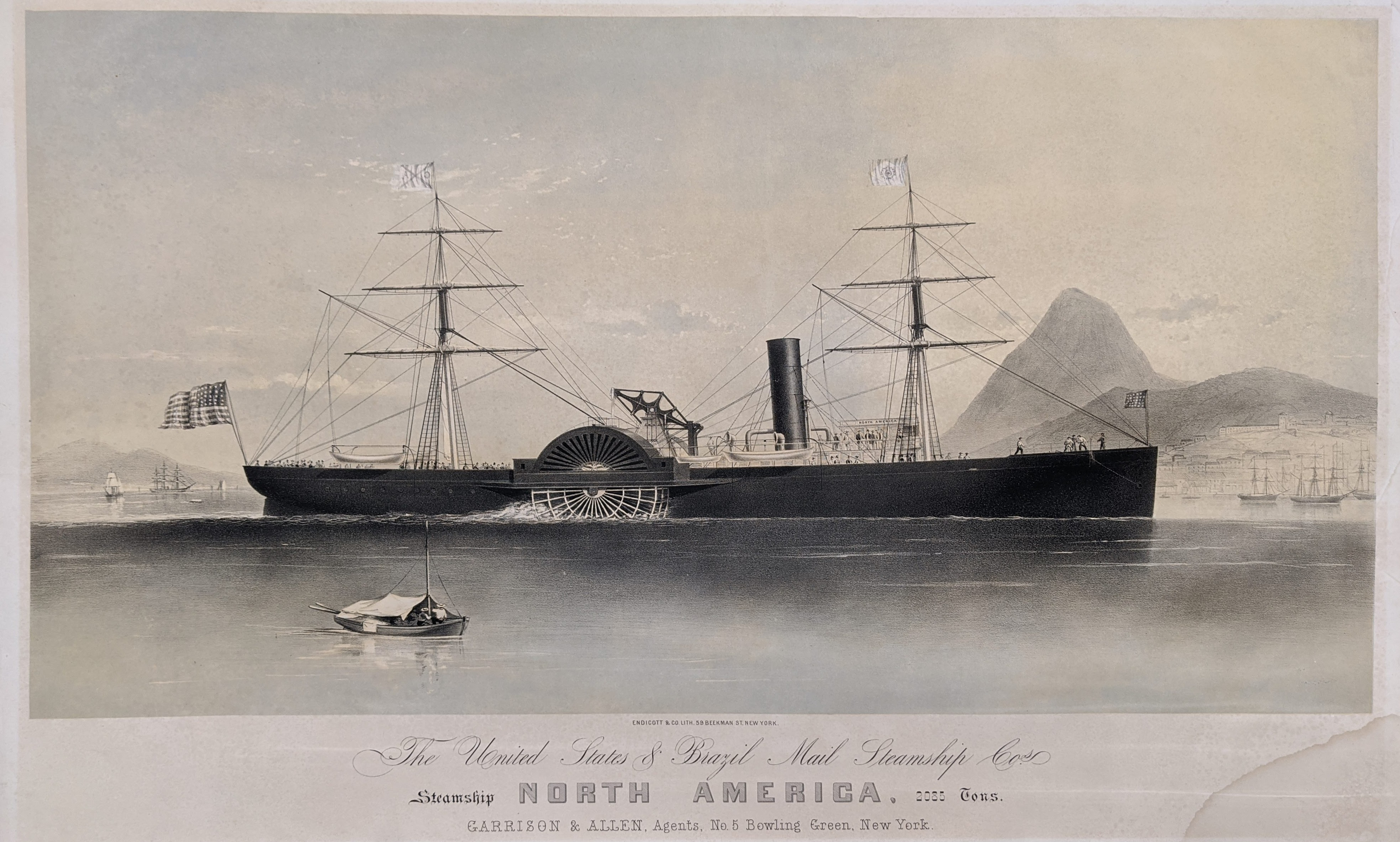
Steamer North America at Rio de Janeiro, c. 1866

Steamship entrepreneur William R. Garrison obtained a contract to carry the U.S. mail, and opened a new steamship line between New York and Brazil. Under the terms of the mail contract, the United States and Brazil Mail Steamship Company was obligated to provide monthly sailings from New York to St. Thomas, Para, Pernambuco, Bahia, and Rio de Janeiro. The company received an annual subsidy of $150,000 from the U.S. Post Office and a smaller subsidy from Brazil. Fort Jackson was renamed North America by her new owners and became a mainstay of the new line.

The new North America sailed from New York bound for Brazil for the first time on 30 October 1865. She returned to New York from Rio de Janeiro on 27 December 1865. She sailed south again on 29 January 1866. This became the cycle of her regular employment; four round-trips per year between New York and Brazil. She carried passengers, freight, and the mails. Among the freight she carried north were hundreds of bags of coffee beans.

North America was overhauled in June 1869. The ship was hauled out on the great balance dock. Damaged hull planking was replaced, her hull was recaulked, and a new layer of copper sheeting was applied to her bottom to protect it from boring worms, and marine growth.

While most of her trips were completed safely, several noteworthy events occurred. On 22 January 1867 North America collided with the Danish bark Christina off Sandy Hook. While the steamer was uninjured, the bark sank in ten minutes. Four of Christina's crew were rescued by North America, and they were left at St. Thomas, the ship's next port of call. During her return to New York from the tropics in December 1867, two passengers on board died of yellow fever. On her arrival, the remaining passengers were quarantined, and the ship was fumigated.

North America's last sailing to Brazil departed from New York on September 23, 1872. After her return in December 1872, she was replaced in the Brazil Line's sailings by the steamer Ontario, a more modern propeller-driven ship. North America sat idle in New York Harbor for the remainder of her existence. In 1875 the ten-year contract to carry the U.S. mail expired, and without the benefit of the $150,000 annual subsidy, the United States and Brazil Mail Steamship Company ceased operations. Its four remaining ships were disposed of variously, with North America being sold for scrap in 1879.
