= USS Wando (1864) =

Gunboat of the United States Navy

History

United States
- Name: USS Wando
- Namesake: Probably the Wando River in South Carolina
- Builder: Messrs. Kirkpatrick, M'Intyre & Co.
- Launched: 25 March1864
- Acquired: 5 November 1864
- Commissioned: 22 December 1864
- Decommissioned: 10 August 1865
- Captured: by Union Navy forces on 21 October 1864
- Fate: Sold 30 November 1865
- Notes: In commercial service as SS Wando from 1865 until sunk in storm February 1872

General characteristics
- Displacement: 645 tons
- Tons burthen: 468 tons
- Length: 230 ft (70 m)
- Beam: 26 ft (7.9 m)
- Draught: 7 ft (2.1 m)
- Propulsion: steam engine; side wheel-propelled
- Armament: one 20-pounder Parrott rifle; one 12-pounder gun; one 12-pounder rifle

The first USS Wando was a steamer captured by the Union Navy during the American Civil War. In commission from 1864 to 1865, she was used by the United States Navy as a gunboat in support of the Union Navy blockade of Confederate waterways.

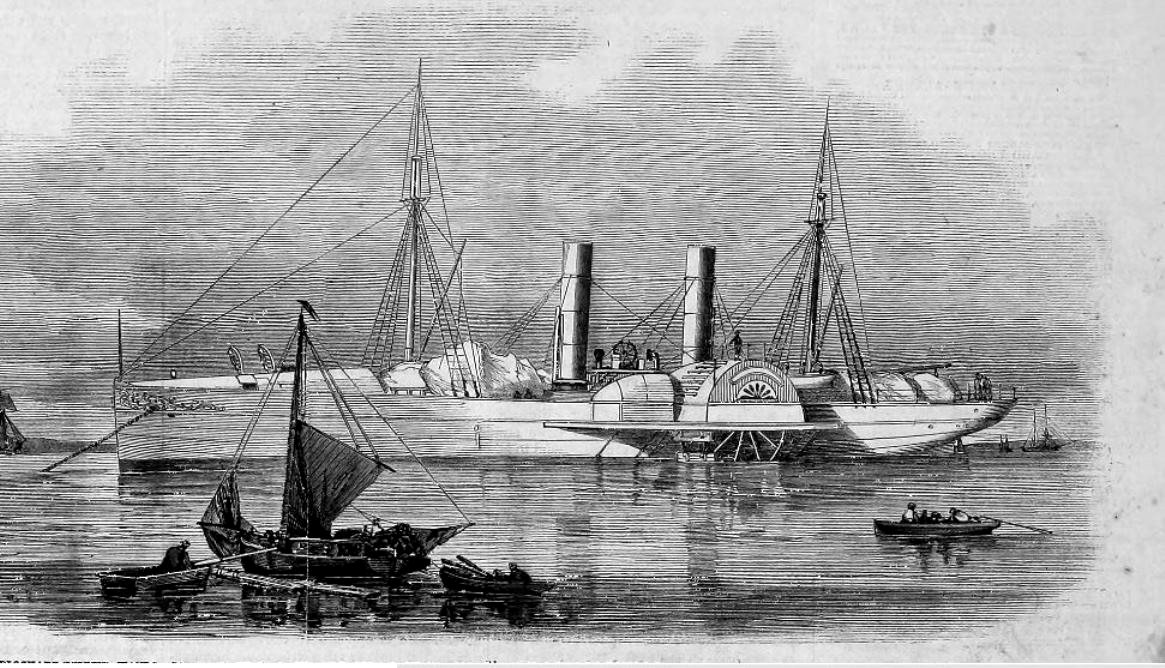
Blockade runner Wando.

== Capture ==
Wando was built in 1864 as the side-wheel steamer Let Her Rip by Messrs. Kirkpatrick, M'Intyre & Co., Port Glasgow, United Kingdom. Launched on 25 March, she was built for use as a Confederate blockade runner in the American Civil War. Let Her Rip sailed under British colors until May 1864 when the Chicora Import and Export Company of Charleston, South Carolina, purchased her. In July 1864, after her first blockade-running trip into Wilmington, North Carolina, she was renamed SS Wando.

Wando was captured at sea off Cape Romain, South Carolina, by the Union side-wheel steamer USS Fort Jackson on 21 October 1864 as she attempted to slip away from the Confederate coast laden with cotton. The U.S. Navy purchased the ship from the Boston, Massachusetts, prize court on 5 November 1864, converted her into a gunboat, and commissioned her as USS Wando at the Boston Navy Yard on 22 December 1864, Acting Master Frederick T. King in command.

== Union actions ==
Late in December 1864, Wando proceeded south for duty with the South Atlantic Blockading Squadron. She arrived at Port Royal, South Carolina, on 5 January 1865 and was stationed on blockade duty off Charleston in February.

Wando departed Charleston on 11 February 1865 and joined in amphibious operations against the Confederate fort and batteries at Andersonville, Bull's Bay, South Carolina, lasting from 13 February to 17 February 1865. The fort and batteries were silenced, prompting the evacuation of Charleston on 18 February 1865. In March, Wando joined the blockading force off Georgetown, South Carolina, and then returned to Charleston in April 1865.

== Decommissioning and sale ==
Wando remained at Charleston until ordered north to the New York Navy Yard on 28 July, 1865. She was decommissioned there on 10 August 1865 and was sold at public auction on 30 November 1865 to H. Allen. She then became the commercial steamship SS Wando, and lasted until February 1872, when she sank in a storm.

== See also ==
- Blockade runners of the American Civil War
- Blockade mail of the Confederacy
