= Portland (1947 tugboat) =

NRHP-listed sternwheel museum ship

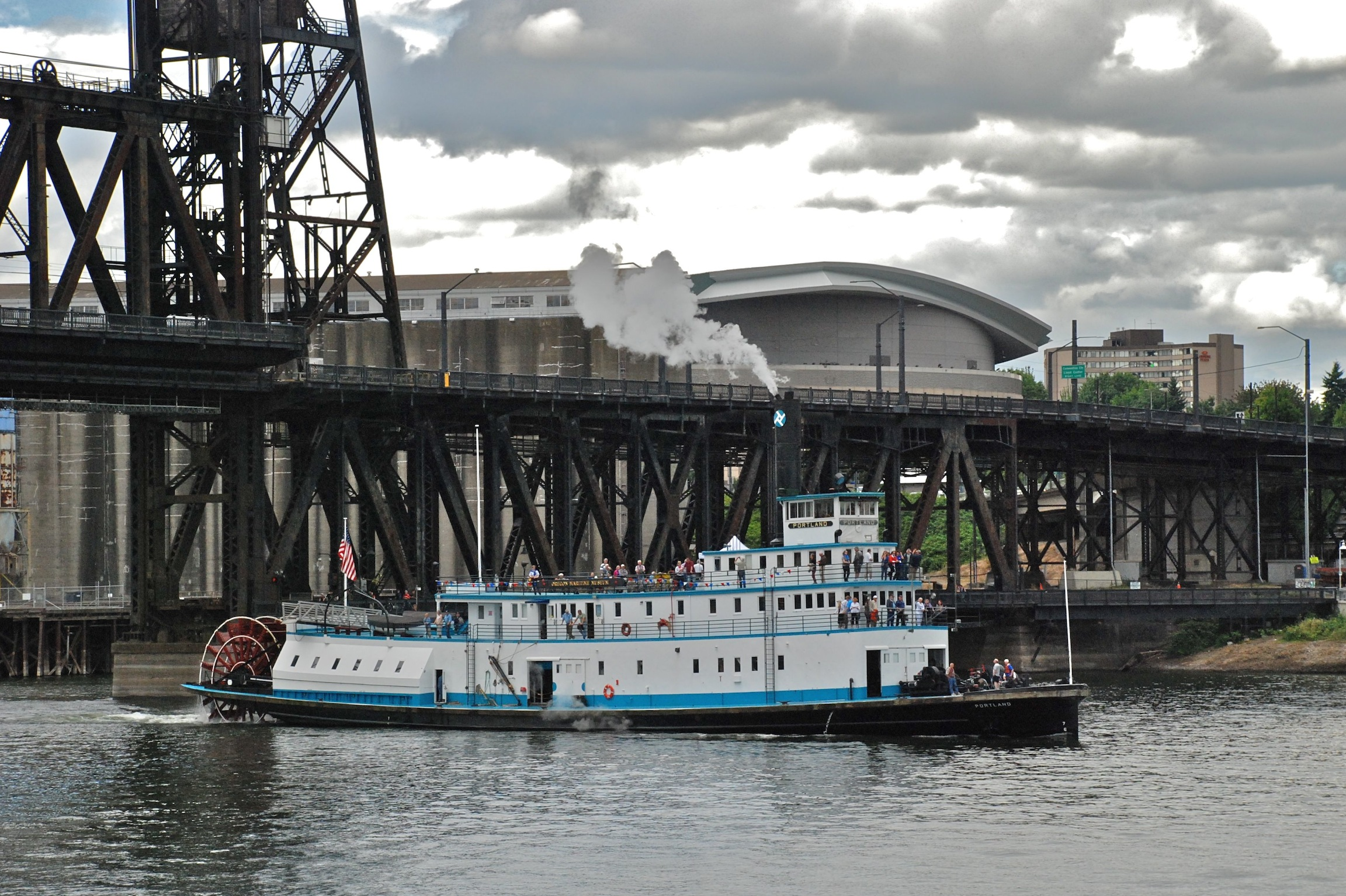
- Portland passing under the Steel Bridge in 2012

History

United States
- Name: Portland
- Owner: Oregon Maritime Museum
- Port of registry: United States
- Builder: Northwest Marine Iron Works of Portland, Oregon
- Cost: $472,000 ($6.81 million in today's dollars)
- Launched: May 24, 1947
- In service: August 29, 1947
- Out of service: 1981
- Status: Museum ship

General characteristics
- Type: Shallow draft inland tug
- Tonnage: 928 GT; 733 NT
- Length: 219 ft (67 m)
- Beam: 42.1 ft (12.8 m)
- Draft: 5.5 ft (1.7 m)
- Installed power: 2 × one-cylinder, 900 hp (670 kW) steam engines
- Propulsion: 25 ft (7.6 m) diameter, 26 ft (7.9 m) wide stern paddlewheel
- Crew: two 7-man shifts and 1 cook
- Portland (steam tug)
- U.S. National Register of Historic Places
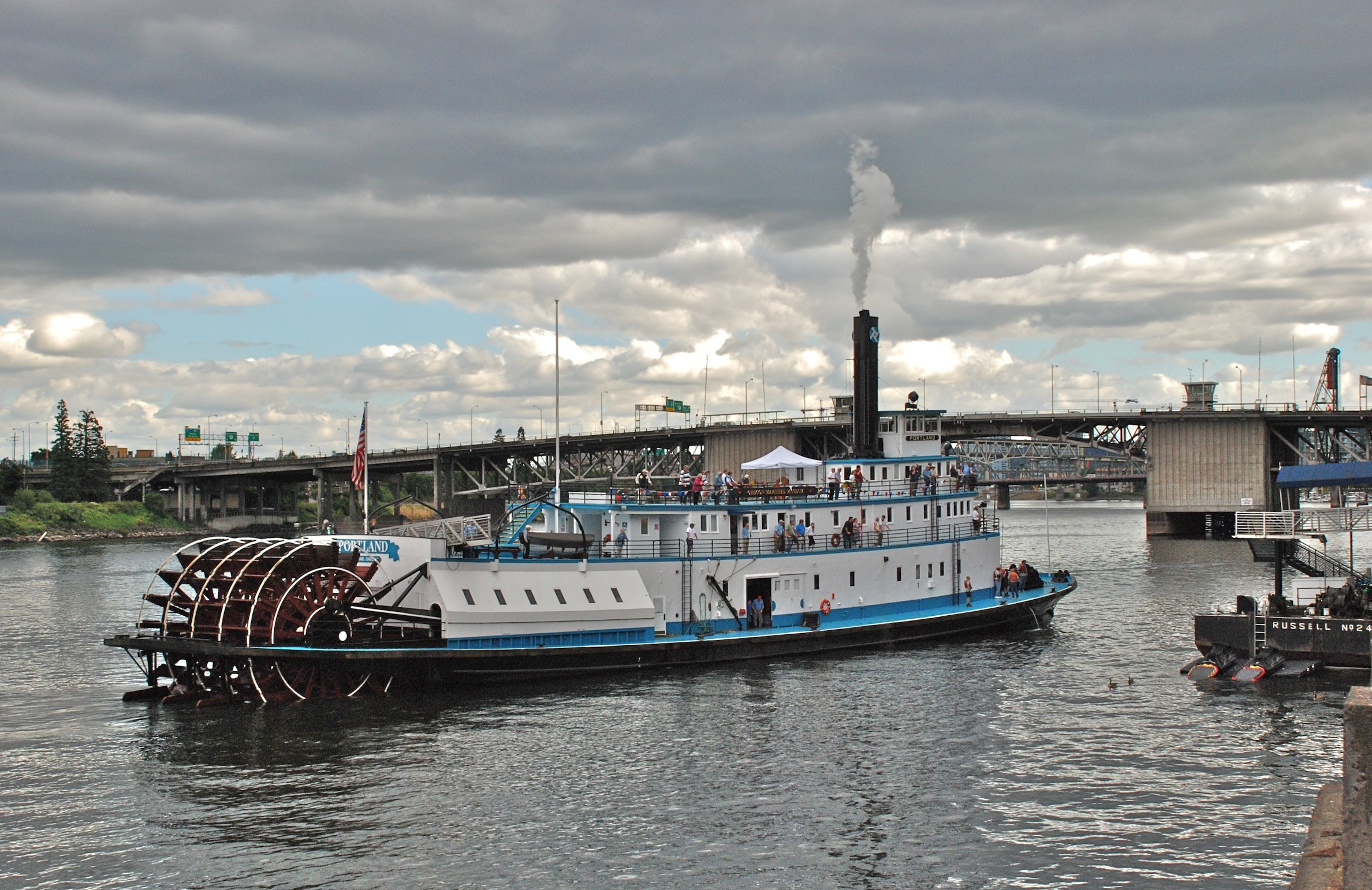
- Portland preparing to dock

- Location within Portland, Oregon
- Location: Portland, Oregon, berthed on the Willamette River at the foot of SW Pine Street
- Coordinates: 45°31′13″N 122°40′11″W
- Built: 1947
- Built by: Northwest Marine Iron Works
- NRHP reference No.: 97000847
- Added to NRHP: August 14, 1997

Portland is a sternwheel steamboat built in 1947 for the Port of Portland in the U.S. state of Oregon.

Portland was listed on the National Register of Historic Places in 1997. It presently hosts the Oregon Maritime Museum, which owns the vessel. The vessel is moored at the Willamette River seawall next to Tom McCall Waterfront Park in downtown Portland.

== History ==
The Portland was built in 1947 by Northwest Marine Iron Works and delivered to the Port of Portland on August 29 of that year. She was operated as a tug by both Willamette Tug & Barge and Shaver Transportation until she was retired in 1981. By that time, the Port of Portland was serving oil supertankers from Alaska that were too large for Portland to assist, and container ships with bow thrusting capabilities that reduced the need for tug assistance.

Built at a time when steam paddlewheels were giving way to more modern propulsion systems, the Portland was originally proposed as a diesel-powered screw-driven vessel, but at the request of the Columbia River Pilots Association she was built with more traditional propulsion. As a result, she was the last steam-powered, sternwheel tugboat built in the United States. She was also the last such vessel still in service in the U.S. by at least 1972 and at the time of her retirement in 1981. For these reasons, she is listed on the National Register of Historic Places as "an outstanding representative of her type and method of construction."

The Portland was built to replace her predecessor of the same name, built in 1919. Unlike her predecessor, the present Portland is built with a steel hull, and a wooden superstructure.

== Oregon Maritime Museum ==
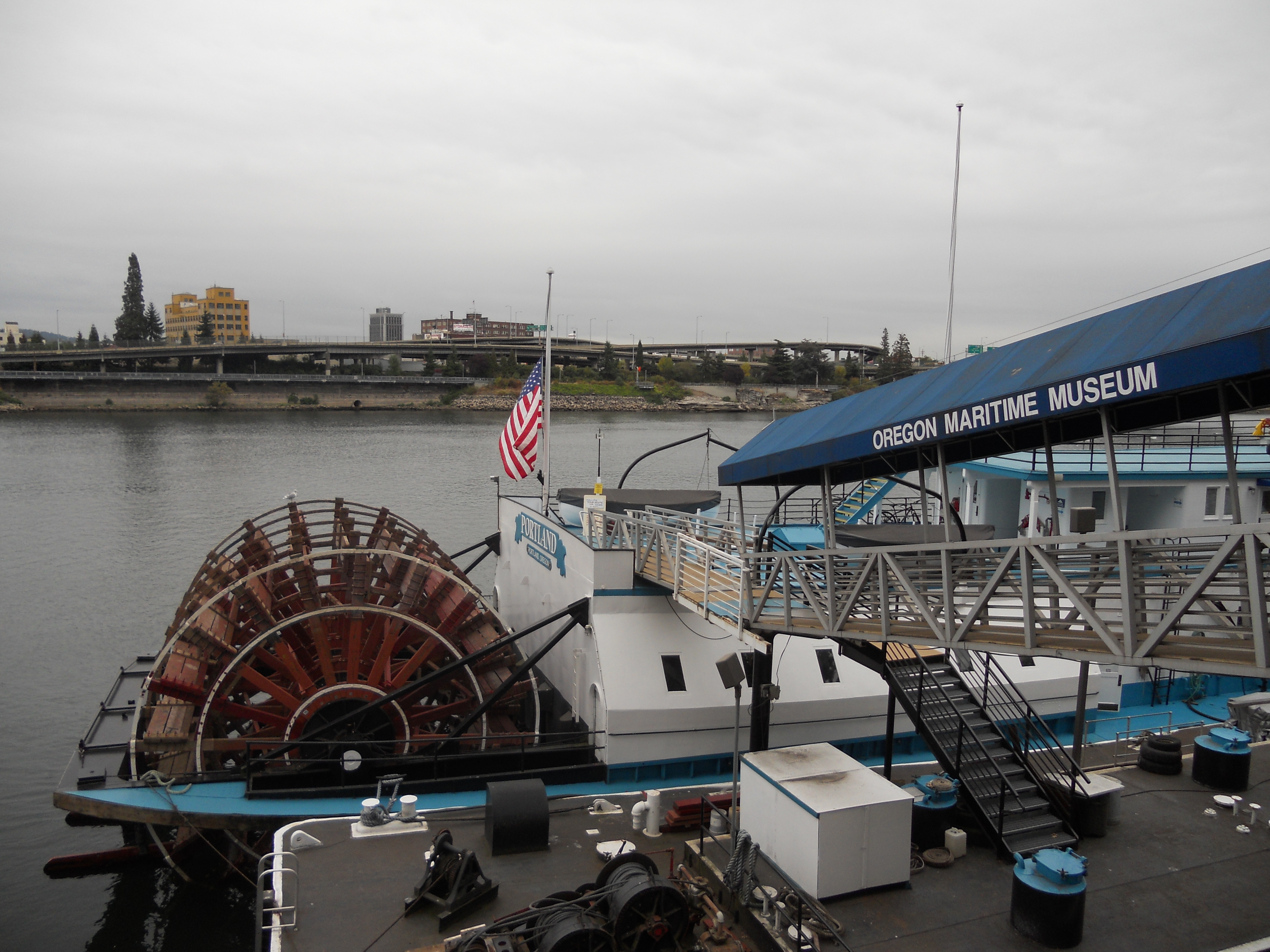
Stern of the Portland with boarding gangplank for museum visitors

In 1991, nearly ten years after the Portland was retired, ownership was transferred to the Oregon Maritime Museum for $1, where restoration work began with the intent of turning her into a stationary museum ship. Interest and fundraising for the project exceeded expectations, and $700,000 in donations allowed Portland to be restored to a functioning, seaworthy condition. Restoration work was completed in 1993, with occasional passenger trips until the Coast Guard inspected the vessel in 2001 and shut passenger operations down until the ship could pass inspection. The museum raised an additional $480,000 in funds, volunteers put in an additional million dollars in labor over seven years, and the ship was cleared for passenger service in 2008.

In 1994, the Portland was moved to her present location, at Tom McCall Waterfront Park in downtown Portland, where she is available most days for tours. In 2002, the static displays for the Oregon Maritime Museum – called the Oregon Maritime Center and Museum until 2004 – were brought on board and are now a part of the tour.

== Notable events ==
=== 1952 steamboat race ===
In 1952, the Portland raced against the older sternwheel tug Henderson in a staged race on the Columbia River in order to promote the upcoming Jimmy Stewart film Bend of the River (with the stars riding on Henderson). Henderson won by a length and a half.

=== 1952 freeing S.G. Follis ===
The heavy-laden S.G. Follis, inbound to Portland, ran firm aground at the Sauvie Island dike. Other tugs tried to free her to no avail. With lines fast to S.G. Follis, the wash from Portland's paddle wheel in full reverse began to loosen the sand under S.G. Follis, allowing Portland to work her free.

=== 1957 Portland saves the Hawthorne Bridge ===
On April 14, 1957, two ships set to be scrapped broke from their moorings and collided with the Hawthorne Bridge. Two of the most powerful diesel tugs available were unable to do much more than relieve some of the strain from the bridge. The Portland was able to free the ships and tow them to moorings before the strain broke the bridge. The Columbia River Pilots Association saw this incident as justification for having insisted that the Portland be a steam-powered sternwheeler.

=== 2008 grounding ===
In 2008, the Portland was set to participate in the first steamboat race on the Columbia River in more than half a century, recreating the 1952 race. She was set to race against the sternwheeler Columbia Gorge, as a part of the Sternwheeler Days Festival in Cascade Locks, Oregon. The Portland's steering locked, and she ran into the bank, damaging her wheel.Without power or steering, she drifted towards the Bonneville Dam until another tug secured a line and towed her to safety. A Coast Guard investigation cited a problem with an improperly repaired gear in the steering system dating back to 1997. The Portland and the Columbia Gorge have since raced at least three times, with the Portland winning two of the races.

=== 2012 collision ===
As the Portland was docking for the Heritage Maritime Festival in St. Helens, she backed into the Portland Pirate Festival's tall ship Royaliste. While no one was injured, significant damage was done to Royaliste.

== Pop culture references ==
- The Portland played the role of the gambling vessel Lauren Belle for the 1994 movie Maverick.
- The Portland's stern appears at the end of the opening credits for the TV series Portlandia, Seasons 1 and 2.

== See also ==
- Portland (1875 tugboat)
- Tourist sternwheelers of Oregon
