= Northwest Marine Iron Works =

Defunct company in Portland, Oregon, U.S.

- Company type: Private
- Industry: Ship repair; Shipbuilding; Manufacturing
- Founded: 1943
- Defunct: 1989
- Fate: Acquired by Southwest Marine
- Headquarters: Portland, Oregon, U.S.

Northwest Marine Iron Works was a ship repair and manufacturing company in Portland, Oregon, United States. The company was established in 1943 and maintained a ship repair business at the Port of Portland's Swan Island shipyard for much of its history. The company experienced financial struggles in the 1980s and was sold to Southwest Marine in 1989.

== History ==
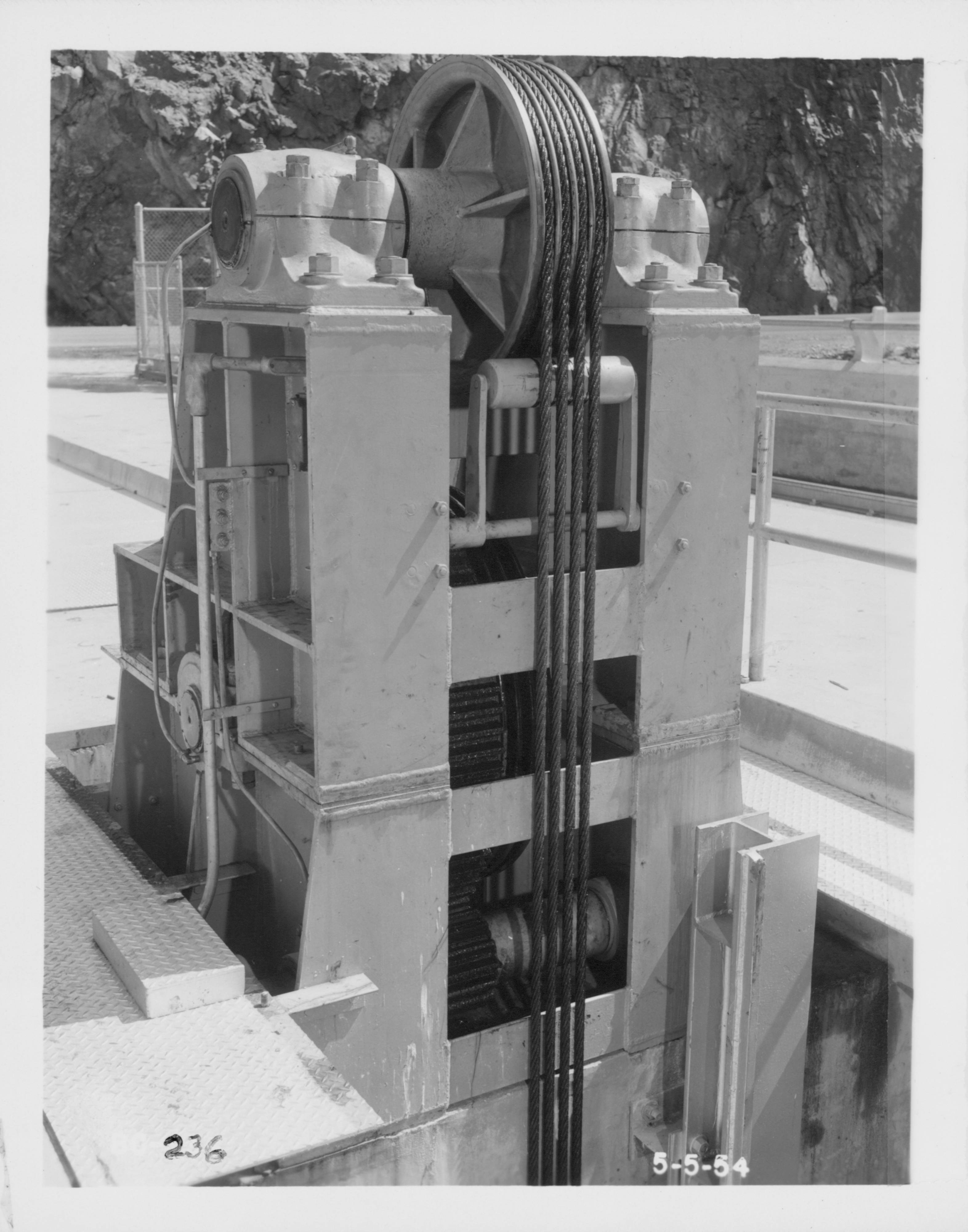
A penstock gate hoist for the Big Cliff Dam manufactured by Northwest Marine Iron Works

Northwest Marine Iron Works was organized in May 1943 in Portland, Oregon. It employed more than 1,000 workers by September 1944. By December 1944, the company ran its ship repair operations at a harbor wall area on the Willamette River near the Burnside Bridge.

Following the end of World War II, the company maintained a ship repair and ship conversion business at the Port of Portland's Swan Island shipyard. The Oregonian reported in 1968 that the company handled approximately 50 percent of the dry dock and ship repair work done in Portland.

In 1974, the company entered an agreement with the Port of Portland and Pacific Alaska Line (a division of Crowley Maritime) to construct three barges for use in a trade link between Oregon and Alaska.

In the 1980s, the companies at the Swan Island shipyard experienced financial difficulties due to an industry-wide slump in shipbuilding and ship repair. Northwest Marine Iron Works filed for Chapter 11 bankruptcy in 1986. At the time, it was one of two unionized ship repair companies at Swan Island, along with Dillingham Ship Repair. In 1988, the company had around 1,300 employees.

Southwest Marine, a San Diego-based shipbuilding company, signed an agreement to buy Northwest Marine Iron Works in March 1989. The Port of Portland, one of Northwest Marine's creditors, agreed to write off a portion of the company's debt in order to facilitate the sale. Cascade General, a competing ship repair company in Portland, filed a lawsuit against the port, alleging that waiving the debt violated the port's contractual agreement with its other shipyard contractors. The company's sale to Southwest Marine was finalized by June 1989. Southwest Marine shut down its Portland operation in 1992.

As of 2025, the company's former headquarters is occupied by an artist studio space named NW Marine Art Works.

== Notable vessels constructed ==
- Portland, the last steam-powered, sternwheel tugboat produced in the U.S.
- USNS De Steiguer, a U.S. Navy oceanographic research ship
- USNS Bartlett, a U.S. Navy oceanographic research ship
