= John Russell Bartlett (naval officer) =

Admiral and oceanographer

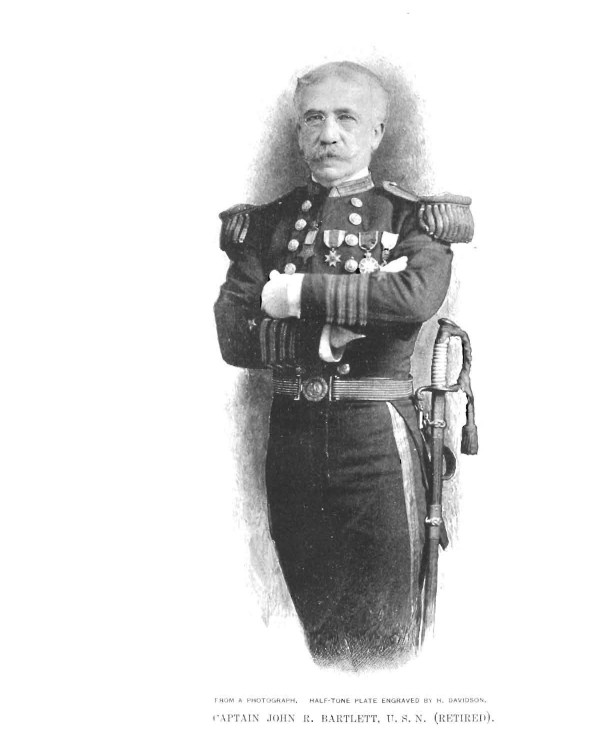
- Born: September 26, 1843; New York City, U.S.
- Died: 1904 (aged 60–61); Lonsdale, Rhode Island, U.S.
- Resting place: Swan Point Cemetery, Providence, Rhode Island, U.S.
- Education: United States Naval Academy
- Occupations: Naval officer, oceanographer

John Russell Bartlett (1843–1904) was an American naval officer and oceanographer.

== Early life ==
Bartlett was born on September 26, 1843, in New York. He was the son of John Russell Bartlett, an ethnologist and Secretary of State of Rhode Island. His mother was Eliza Allen Rhodes. He grew up in Cambridge, Massachusetts.

== Navy career ==
Bartlett entered the United States Naval Academy in November 1859 and attended the academy until being transferred to the steam sloop USS Brooklyn in the early months of the American Civil War. While on board the Brooklyn, he was present during the capture of Forts Jackson and St. Philip in April 1862, the capture of New Orleans a few days later, as well as the Siege of Vicksburg.

He was promoted to ensign in 1863 and served on Admiral Dahlgren's staff during the blockade of Charleston from 1863 to 1864. He was promoted to lieutenant in February 1864. He also participated in the assault on Fort Fisher in North Carolina in January 1865.

After the war, he mapped parts of West Africa, Tehuantepec, and the Coatzacoalcos River. He was promoted to lieutenant commander in July 1866.

He married Jeanie R. Jenckes of Lonsdale, Rhode Island on February 6, 1872. He was promoted to the rank of commander in 1877.

From November 1878 until 1882, he commanded the oceanographic survey ship George S. Blake of the United States Coast and Geodetic Survey, where he discovered, between Jamaica and Cuba, the Bartlett Deep. Other accomplishments while commanding the Blake included working with biologist Alexander Emanuel Agassiz and studying the Gulf Stream.

From 1882 until 1888 he was in charge of the Hydrographic Office. In 1888 he was one of 33 co-founders the National Geographic Society. He was promoted to captain in 1892. On December 10, 1896, he assumed command of the newly "repaired" monitor USS Puritan.

He was involuntarily retired from the Navy on 12 July 1897 for "incapacity resulting from incident of service".

== Later life ==
In 1898 he received an honorary Doctor of Science degree (Sc.D.) from Brown University.

During the Spanish–American War, Bartlett was recalled to active duty on 25 April 1898 and served until October of that year. Upon his recall, he was placed in charge of the Office of Naval Intelligence and the Coast Signal Service. On July 9 he was also placed in command of the Auxiliary Naval Force which consisted of 41 vessels, 200 officers and 3,000 men. The Auxiliary Naval Force was responsible for coastal defense and was organized into nine districts which covered the Atlantic, Gulf and Pacific coasts of the United States. With the rapid conclusion of hostilities against Spain, the Auxiliary Naval Force was disbanded almost as quickly as it was formed with most of its vessels being deactivated by the end of August.

In February 1903, he was promoted by President Theodore Roosevelt to the rank of rear admiral on the retired list.

Bartlett died in Lonsdale, Rhode Island in 1904. He was buried in the Swan Point Cemetery in Providence.

== Memberships ==
Admiral Bartlett was a member of numerous hereditary and military societies. These included the Military Order of the Loyal Legion of the United States, the Grand Army of the Republic, the Naval Order of the United States, the Society of Colonial Wars and the Naval and Military Order of the Spanish War. In 1890 he became a charter member of the Rhode Island Society of the Sons of the American Revolution.

== Legacy ==
The U.S. Navy oceanographic research ship USNS Bartlett (T-AGOR-13) was named after him. The Bartlett served in the Navy from 1969 to 1993.

== Dates of rank ==
- Acting Midshipman - 25 November 1859
- Ensign - 8 September 1863
- Lieutenant - 22 February 1864
- Lieutenant Commander - 25 July 1866
- Commander - 25 April 1877
- Captain - 1 July 1892
- Retired List - 12 July 1897
- Rear Admiral on the Retired List - February 1903
