= USNS Lynch =

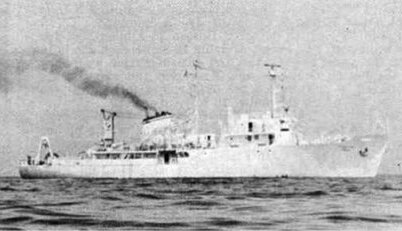
- USNS Lynch (T-AGOR-7) tending SPAR (Seagoing Platform for Acoustic Research), June 1966, near Solomons, MD.

History

United States
- Name: Lynch
- Namesake: Captain William Francis Lynch
- Builder: Marietta Mfg. Co., Point Pleasant, West Virginia
- Laid down: 7 September 1962
- Launched: 17 March 1964
- Sponsored by: Mrs. Walter M. Windsor as proxy for Miss Withers Millard, great great granddaughter of Captain William Francis Lynch
- Acquired: by the Navy, 23 July 1965
- In service: circa 1965 as USNS Lynch (T-AGOR-7)
- Out of service: 23 December 1994
- Stricken: 23 December 1994
- Identification: IMO number: 7742126
- Fate: Scrapped, 29 November 2001

General characteristics
- Type: Robert D. Conrad-class oceanographic research ship
- Tonnage: 1,200 tons
- Displacement: 1,370 tons
- Length: 209 ft (64 m)
- Beam: 40 ft (12 m)
- Draft: 16 ft (4.9 m)
- Propulsion: diesel-electric, single propeller, 2,500shp, retractable azimuth-compensating bow thruster
- Speed: 12 knots
- Complement: 23 civilian mariners, 38 scientists

USNS Lynch (T-AGOR-7) was a Robert D. Conrad-class oceanographic research ship that served the United States Navy from 1965 to 1994. During that period the ship was one of the ships under the technical direction of the Naval Oceanographic Office (NAVOCEANO) operating as an Auxiliary General Oceanographic Research (AGOR) program "pool" ship for support of Navy laboratories on each coast as well as NAVOCEANO projects. Lynch was assigned to support laboratories on the East Coast.

== Construction ==
Lynch, an oceanographic research ship and the second naval vessel with the name, was laid down 7 September 1962 by Marietta Manufacturing Co., Point Pleasant, West Virginia; launched 17 March 1964; sponsored by Mrs. Walter M. Windsor as proxy for Miss Withers Millard, great-great-granddaughter of Captain William Francis Lynch. The ship was towed to New Orleans on 4 April 1965 for completion and trials. Lynch was delivered to the Military Sea Transportation Service (MSTS) 23 July 1965 which assigned the designation T-AGOR-7.

== Operations ==
Lynch was added to the Naval Oceanographic Office's Auxiliary General Oceanographic Research (AGOR) program fleet becoming operational 16 November 1965. Ships in the AGOR program were under that office's technical direction but supported work of Navy laboratories as "pool" ships on each coast with Lynch joining James M. Gilliss and Sands in the East Coast pool.

Following MSTS acceptance, Lynch underwent shakedown training in the Gulf of Mexico. In November 1965 she proceeded to New London, Connecticut, to commence oceanographic research operations for the Naval Oceanographic Office. The 15 scientists embarked, working with the latest oceanographic equipment, analyzed ocean currents, the effects of salinity and temperature on sonic transmission, and the effects of pressure on various materials. The ship during the first seven and a half months of operation completed nine cruises with 122 days at sea supporting two East Coast Navy laboratories as well as NAVOCEANO missions.

Lynch commenced research operations in early 1966 using the SPAR (Seagoing Platform for Acoustic Research), a non powered acoustic research vehicle, in the western Atlantic Ocean. The SPAR is 355 ft (108.2 m) feet long, 8 ft (2.4 m) in diameter and when partially flooded acts as a buoy with 302 ft (92.0 m) submerged. (Note: The article describes SPAR as having a draft of 302 ft (92.0 m), displacement of 1,720 tons with the upper 70 ft (21.3 m) used for instrumentation with the sensors being an array of hydrophones. The mother ship stayed 300 ft (91.4 m) to 600 ft (182.9 m) feet away to avoid noise interference. SPAR was funded by the Bureau of Naval Weapons and built at Aerojet-General Shipyard, Jacksonville, Florida with launch on 17 July 1964.) The platform measures acoustic data transmitting it to the research ship by cable. Lynch was equipped to tow SPAR to position and monitor conditions in the platform as well as record data by personnel from the Naval Ordnance Laboratory. After test in Chesapeake Bay out of Solomons, Maryland Lynch towed SPAR for operational test off Cape Hatteras.

Lynch continued research for NAVOCEANO operating in the Atlantic Ocean. In 1984 the ship made Conductivity-Temperature-Depth (CTD) measurements in the Fram Strait between Greenland and Spitzbergen. Lynch worked in open waters while the Norwegian MV Polarqueen and the German research icebreaker Polarstern and their helicopters worked in ice. (Note: MV Polarqueen is found in the reference and in other such publications as one word. Search returns hits for MV Polar Queen but without the research links. Definite identification and resolution not yet done.)

== Inactivation ==
Lynch entered the Maritime Administration James River Reserve Fleet on 21 October 1991 and withdrawn for scrapping 30 August 2001 with final disposition on 29 November.
