= United States Coast Signal Service =

Former U.S. Navy agency

The United States Coast Signal Service was established at the beginning of the Spanish–American War to help defend the coast of the United States through observation and communication. It operated from April through August, 1898.

== History ==
In 1897, John Davis Long, then secretary of the U.S. Navy, appointed a board to evaluate the establishment of signal stations along the coast. The board submitted a plan, but no action was taken at that time.

In April 1898, as the prospect of war became more likely, Naval War College president Captain Caspar F. Goodrich was ordered to establish signal stations along the coastline. Goodrich headquartered aboard the USS New Hampshire. Goodrich was succeeded by Captain Theodore F. Kane, and Kane was relieved by Captain John R. Bartlett for the remainder of the system's existence. Bartlett moved the headquarters from the USS New Hampshire to Washington. The Coast Signal Service was placed under the supervision of the Office of Naval Intelligence.

The order to establish the coast signal stations was given on 22 April, and almost all stations were in operation within two weeks. Initially, the militiamen sent to these stations were sheltered when possible by the Lighthouse and Life Saving Service and in tents when there were no other accommodations.

The Coast Signal Service organized the east coast of the United States into eight districts (Note: America's Anchor states 7 districts. Paullin's History of Naval Administration states 8 districts, which is corroborated by the Report of the Secretary of the Navy, 1898.) and established 36 primary signal stations, along with lighthouses, life-saving states, and coastal weather stations, each of which was connected to the Life Saving Service as well as the central office in Washington, either telegraphically or telephonically. The service absorbed light-house keepers and U.S. Weather Bureau observers as well as some members of state naval militias, bringing its manpower total to 2,526 men. Each station was manned by a chief quartermaster, three second class quartermasters, and one landsman. Critical stations also had an extra telegraph operator.

The signal stations kept watch for enemy vessels, suspicious crafts, and any other craft that entered their areas. Secondary stations notified the primary stations of ships approaching or transiting. The primary stations were responsible for communicating with the ships. The Coast Signal Service provided a "Notice to Mariners" to the Associated Press to request that ship captains report anything of interest to the nearest station.

Navy and Merchant Marines vessels transmitted military information via the Coast Signal Service locations, each of which was equipped with "Springfield rifles, international code flags and related code books, wigwag flags (with cones and drums for calm weather), powerful binoculars, spyglasses, and telescopes".

The Department of the Navy was able to keep in touch with the ships of the Northern Patrol Squadron by using the Coast Signal Service stations. As an after-action report put it, "the nonappearance of an enemy is the only excuse that can be offered for not reporting one during the entire war". Bartlett requested permission to close the final station at Cape Henry, Virginia, on 13 August 1898. When the service was shut down, war-related telegraph and telephone wires were given to the U.S. Lighthouse Service.
