= Portland (1875 tugboat) =

American steam tug

History
- Name: Portland, Clayoquat, Phoenix
- Route: Columbia River, Puget Sound, coastal British Columbia
- Launched: April 9, 1875

General characteristics
- Type: Steam tug, inland steamboat, cannery tender
- Length: 75.7 ft (23.07 m)
- Beam: 16 ft (4.88 m)
- Depth: 6 ft (1.83 m)
- Installed power: compound steam engine
- Propulsion: propeller

Portland was a steam tug built in Portland, Oregon, United States. This vessel was also known as Clayoquat and Phoenix.

== Career ==
Portland was launched on April 9, 1875, in Portland, Oregon. The vessel was operated for 15 years on the Columbia and Willamette Rivers, and then was transferred to Puget Sound. From 1891 to 1895, Portland operated out of Everett, Washington, piloted by Captain James Hastings.

== Drift and recovery ==
In 1897, Portland was hauled out at Ballard, Washington, for repairs. Somehow she broke free from the shipway and floated off unoccupied. Eventually, Portland drifted north into Canadian waters, where she was recovered as a derelict by the B.C. Salvage Company. She came under the control of R.P. Rithet and Company, a prominent British Columbia shipping concern that re-purposed her to a passenger steamer. She was renamed Clayoquat and ran on passenger routes out of Port Renfrew, on the west coast of Vancouver Island. Clayoquat later passed to the H.Bell-Irving Company, and was used by them as a cannery tender under the name Phoenix.

== See also ==
- Portland (1947 tugboat)
