= William Franklin Sands =

American diplomat (1874–1946)

William F. Sands
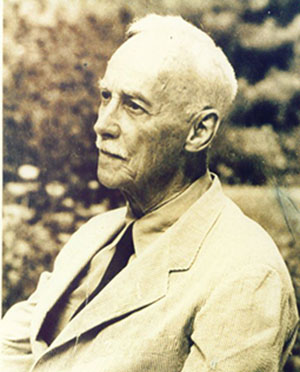

United States Minister to Guatemala
- In office October 9, 1909 – October 14, 1910
- President: William Howard Taft
- Preceded by: William Heimke
- Succeeded by: Robert Stockwell Reynolds Hitt

Personal details
- Born: July 29, 1874 Washington, D.C.
- Died: June 17, 1946 (aged 71) Washington, D.C.
- Education: Georgetown University (BA, LL.B.)
- Occupation: Diplomat, author, professor

William Franklin Sands (July 29, 1874 – June 17, 1946) was a United States diplomat most known for his service in Korea on the eve of Japan's colonization of that country.

== Biography ==
William Franklin Sands was born in Washington, D.C., on July 29, 1874, the son of James Hoban and Mary Elizabeth (Meade) Sands. He was the grandson of Benjamin F. Sands and Henrietta M. (French) Sands, and a descendant of Hobert Sands, who came to America in 1776 and settled at West River, Maryland. Members of his family have played prominent roles in every war since the American Revolution.

Sands was educated at the College de St. Michel in Fribourg, Switzerland, and at Feldkirch, Austria, and later attended Georgetown College (class of 1896). He graduated from Georgetown University Law School, where he received the LL.B. degree, also in 1896.

Following graduation, Sands was appointed second secretary of legation at Tokyo, and in the following year became the first secretary of legation at Seoul, where he remained for two years. Between 1900 and 1904 he served as adviser to Emperor Gojong of Korea, succeeding Clarence Greathouse and General Charles Legendre, both of whom had died in Seoul in 1899. It was during this period, in 1901, that Sands received the Cross of the Legion of Honor of France and was made a chevalier of that order for protecting French missionaries during an uprising on the island of Jeju. He was also decorated by the Korean emperor for his assistance in stamping out this uprising without loss of life.

At the outbreak of the Russo-Japanese War Sands was succeeded by Durham White Stevens. He reentered the U.S. diplomatic service where he functioned as an "emergency man" or "trouble shooter"; his assignments at that time were usually as special envoy to capital cities in which there was a perceived crisis. He was sent to Panama in this capacity in 1904 as first secretary of legation under Charles E. Magoon, to ease frictions and allay fears that had arisen from the American involvement in the revolt against Columbia and from Theodore Roosevelt's seizure of the canal zone.

In Our Jungle Diplomacy, Sands pointed out that United States policy in South America was creating a perception among Latin Americans that the U.S. was intending to absorb their continent. He noted that the Japanese took US foreign policy in the region as a precedent to justify their own imperialistic plans in Asia. In his November 25, 1944 review of the book, in The Saturday Review, Ambassador Charles Yost wrote: "The episodes and anecdotes with which the book abounds catch the flavor of existence in those informal days and passionate climes" Yost goes on to say that the book argues "that in foreign policy our grasp exceeded our reach. The book moves from this premise…to the somewhat startling conclusion that we are responsible for Japanese imperialism…A similar lack of proportion and balance would seem to characterize the conclusion…that we are still the Big Bad Wolf of the Western Hemisphere." When the book sticks to being "a memoir on the olden days…the book is delightful and rewarding." But, continued Yost, when the author and his collaborator [Joseph M Lalley] comment on "the burning issues of the moment…the result is not impressive, since their political conclusions are based on data the collection of which apparently ceased about the year 1910." His obituary in the NY Times stated that if the US government had listened to him, World War II could have been averted.

Two years after arriving in Panama, Sands proceeded to Guatemala in a similar capacity, and in 1908 became the first secretary of the embassy in Mexico. In 1909 he became envoy extraordinary and minister plenipotentiary to Guatemala.

In 1911, Sands represented James Speyer & Co. of New York in Ecuador for the projected construction of the Guayaquil waterworks as a safeguard against the last west stronghold of yellow fever and bubonic plague. While in Ecuador, Sands made a study of the Alfaro-Estrada revolution. During the years 1915 and 1916, he represented George McFadden & Co. of Philadelphia at London for the solution of the British naval seizures of non-contraband cotton. When that was settled, Basil Miles of the U.S. State Department sent him a cable asking him to help organize the relief of the German and Austrian prisoners of war in Russia – about 1,000,000 prisoners of war and over 500,000 interred civilians.

== Family ==
Sands married Edith Gertrude Keating, daughter of John M. Keating of Philadelphia, on August 17, 1909. They had four sons, James Sands, William Franklin Sands, Robert Sands, and John Keating Sands.

Sands died in Washington, D.C. on June 17, 1946.

== Namesakes ==
The William Franklin Sands Memorial Soccer Trophy at the Portsmouth Abbey School is given annually to a member of the boys' soccer team who shows courtesy, courage, and skill, making him a dependable teammate and natural leader.

== Publications ==
- Sands, William F. Undiplomatic Memories. New York: Whittlesey House, McGraw-Hill Book Co, 1930.
- Sands, William F. and Joseph M. Lalley. Our Jungle Diplomacy. Chapel Hill: University of North Carolina Press, 1944.

== Collected papers ==
The William Franklin Sands papers are held at the Philadelphia Archdiocesan Historical Research Center, 100 E. Wynnewood Rd. Wynnewood, PA 19096–3001. There are four collections, which consist of manuscripts, notebooks, correspondence, and articles. The diplomatic papers in these collections are made up of notebooks that he kept while serving in Korea, Japan, Central America, and Russia. Many of his early letters tell of events such as the Boxer Rebellion and the Russo-Japanese war, as well as of political unrest in Central America and the events surrounding the building of the Panama Canal.

Much of the collection comprises correspondence between himself and presidents William McKinley, Theodore Roosevelt, William Howard Taft, and Franklin D. Roosevelt, as well as John Hay, Elihu Root, Philander Knox, Prince Albert Radziwill, Walter Lippman, Frank Kellog, General George Davis, among others.

The papers also contain articles written by Sands for Journals such as The Commonweal.
