= James H. Sands =

United States Navy admiral (1845–1911)

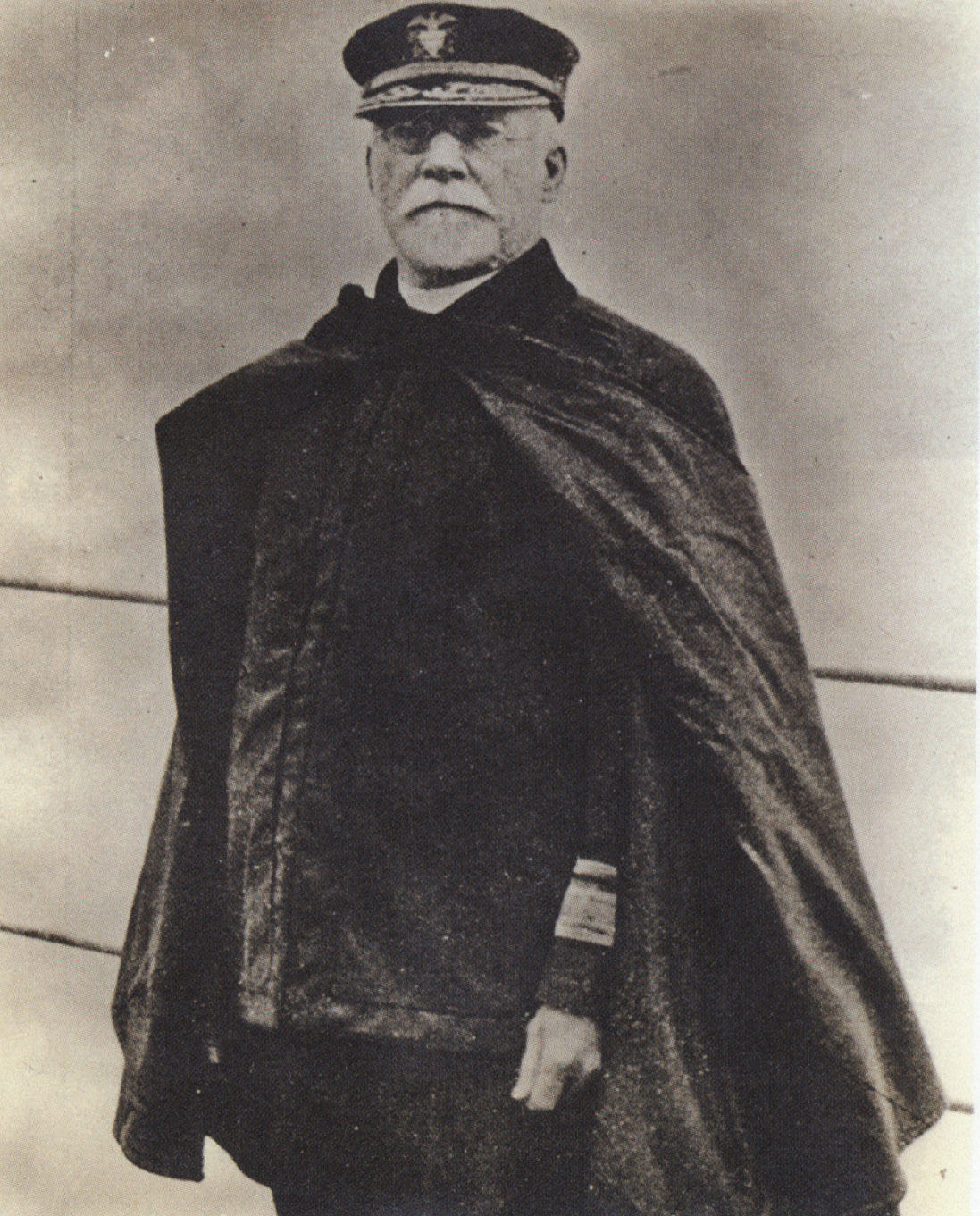
- Born: July 12, 1845; Washington, D.C., U.S.
- Died: October 26, 1911 (aged 66); Washington, D.C., U.S.
- Burial place: Arlington National Cemetery
- Military career
- Allegiance: United States of America
- Branch: United States Navy
- Service years: 1859–1907
- Rank: Rear Admiral
- Unit: Superintendent of the United States Naval Academy
- Conflicts: American Civil War
- Awards: twice advanced in grade for gallantry

Rear Admiral James Hoban Sands (July 12, 1845 – October 26, 1911) was an officer in the United States Navy during the American Civil War and eventually became Superintendent of the United States Naval Academy.

== Naval career ==
Son of Rear Admiral Benjamin F. Sands, he was born in Washington, D.C., in 1845. Sands was appointed acting midshipman in the United States Naval Academy on November 25, 1859, and graduated in 1863 while the academy was still in Newport. During the American Civil War, he served in Tuscarora, Juniata, and Shenandoah and, in the years that followed, in USS Hartford and Richmond. He was part of the blockading fleet during the Civil War, which for a time was commanded by his father, and was present at the evacuation of Charleston; he also participated in both attacks on Fort Fisher, for which he was cited for gallantry in action, and twice recommended for promotion.

Ordered to the Naval Observatory in 1869, he returned to sea duty on the Asiatic Station, a year and a half later. From October 1873 to April 1875, he served in the Hydrographic Office. Duty in Minnesota and Iroquois followed; and, in 1884, he returned to Washington, D.C., for duty at the Washington Navy Yard.

During the 1890s, he commanded Monongahela; served as equipment officer at the Boston Navy Yard; commanded Columbia and Minneapolis; and served as Governor of the Naval Home Squadron at Philadelphia, Pennsylvania.

Detached from the latter in 1901, he became a member of the retirement board and assumed its presidency in 1902. Commissioned rear admiral the same year, he served as commandant of the Philadelphia Navy Yard, League Island, Philadelphia, from May 1902 to April 1903; commanded the Coast Squadron until 1905; then assumed duty as the nineteenth superintendent of the Naval Academy. Further duty on the retirement board and as president, Naval Examining Board, followed; and, in July 1907, he transferred to the retired list.

== Death ==
Sands died in Washington, D.C., on October 26, 1911, and is buried at Arlington National Cemetery, Arlington, Virginia.

== Family ==
Sands was a devout Roman Catholic, and his influence was effective in creating a tolerance for Catholics and others of various faiths at the Naval Academy and within the military services. Sands was married to Mary Elizabeth Meade, who came from a famous Philadelphia, Pennsylvania, family. She also converted to Catholicism.

They had three sons and four daughters. One of the sons, William Franklin Sands, became United States Minister to Guatemala, and two of the daughters, Clara and Hilda, became Religious of the Sacred Heart.

== Namesakes ==
Two ships were named USS Sands for Sands and his father, Benjamin F. Sands:

- Sands (DD-243/APD-13), a Clemson-class destroyer, commissioned in 1920
- Sands (T-AGOR-6), an oceanographic research ship, placed in service in 1965
- Grandson, James Sands (father William F. Sands); great grandson, James H. Sands (father James Sands, Grandfather William F. Sands); and great-great grandsons: James H. Sands-Berking (parents Adele G. Sands and Carter Berking, Grandfather James Sands, great-grandfather William F. Sands) and James Sands.

== See also ==
- List of superintendents of the United States Naval Academy

Academic offices
Preceded by Willard H. Brownson	Superintendent of United States Naval Academy; 1905-1907	Succeeded by Charles J. Badger
