= Benjamin F. Sands =

United States Navy admiral (1811–1883)

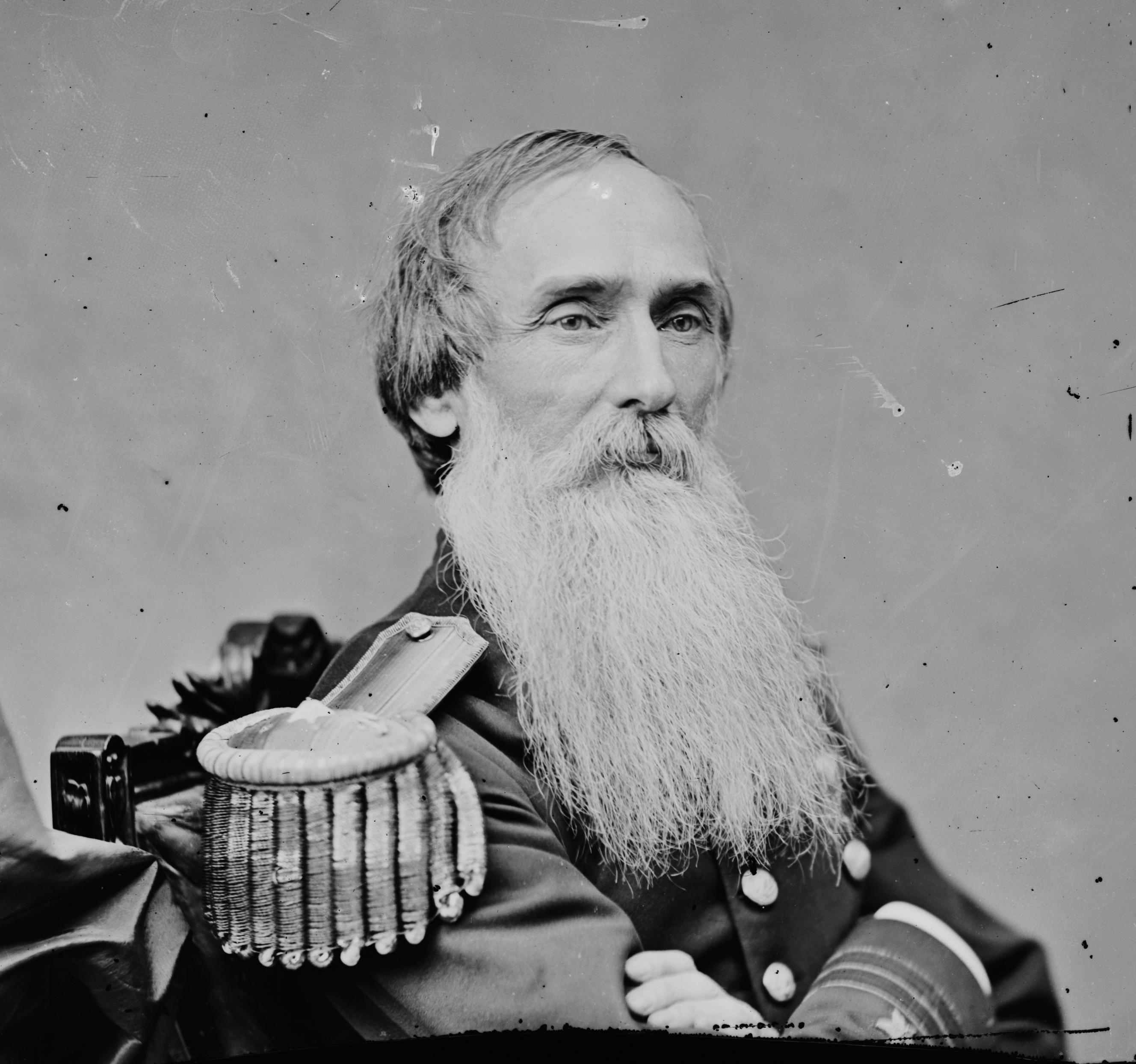
- Benjamin F. Sands
- Born: February 11, 1811; Baltimore, Maryland
- Died: June 30, 1883 (aged 72); Washington, D.C.
- Burial place: Arlington National Cemetery
- Military career
- Allegiance: United States of America
- Branch: United States Navy
- Service years: 1828–1874
- Rank: Rear Admiral
- Unit: Various
- Commands: USS Porpoise (1836), USS Dacotah, USS Fort Jackson
- Conflicts: Mexican-American War: American Civil War; Engagement at Fort Caswell; Wilmington campaigns; First Battle of Fort Fisher; Second Battle of Fort Fisher

Rear Admiral Benjamin Franklin Sands (February 11, 1811 – June 30, 1883) was an officer in the United States Navy during the Mexican–American War and the American Civil War.

== U.S. Navy career ==
Born in Baltimore, Maryland, Sands was appointed midshipman in the United States Navy on April 1, 1828. By 1834, he had served on the Brazil Station and in the West Indies and Mediterranean squadrons. From 1834 to 1841, he was engaged in coastal survey work and during the mid-40s was attached to the Bureau (Depot) of Charts and Instruments at the Naval Observatory.

During hostilities between the United States and Mexico, he was attached to the Home Squadron and served off Tabasco and Tuxpan on the brig USS Washington. In the 1850s, he commanded the steamer Walker in the Gulf of Mexico on coast survey duty and invented a deep sea sounding apparatus and other hydrographic instruments. In 1861, Sands served on west coast survey duty as commander of the Active. Commissioned captain in 1862, he joined the North Atlantic Blockading Squadron as commander of Dacotah in 1863.

In February of that year, Sands participated in the engagement at Fort Caswell. He remained off the Carolinas for another two years, commanding the steamer USS Fort Jackson during the attacks on Fort Fisher. In February 1865, he was transferred to the West Gulf Blockading Squadron and assigned to duty off the Texas coast. Through the end of the American Civil War, he commanded a division off that coast; and, on June 2, 1865, took formal possession of Galveston, Texas for the Union.

After the war, Sands, appointed Commodore in July 1866, served at the Boston Navy Yard until returning to Washington, D.C. as Superintendent of the Naval Observatory. Commissioned Rear Admiral on April 27, 1871, he remained at the Observatory until he retired in 1874. He is the author of an autobiography titled From Reefer to Rear Admiral: Reminisces and Journal Jottings of Nearly Half a Century of Naval Life, published posthumously in 1899. He died in Washington DC on June 30, 1883 of heart failure at age 72.

== Family ==
Rear Admiral Sands belonged to a prominent military family. His uncle, Lt. Col. James Harvey Hook (1791–1841), served in War of 1812 and was later Assistant Commissary General of the U.S. Army. In 1836, Sands married Henrietta French (1817–1893), the sister of General William H. French. Their son, James H. Sands, also achieved the rank of Rear Admiral in the U.S. Navy and served as Superintendent of the Naval Academy, while another son, George Henry Sands (1855–1920), was a colonel in the US Army and served in Cuba during the Spanish–American War. Two other sons, William F. and Francis P. B., also served in the Navy. A daughter, Marion, married Rear Admiral Samuel Rhoads Franklin. Sands' eldest brother, Lewis Hook Sands (born 1805), was a colonel in the US Army and served as an Indian agent in the Midwest. A nephew, James Hook Sands, was a captain in the Indiana Cavalry during the Civil War who later served in the regular army during the Indian Wars. A grandson, Alfred Lawrence Pearson Sands (1882–1960), the son of George Henry, was a colonel in the Army while another grandson, William Franklin Sands (1874–1946), was a U.S. diplomat who served in Korea, Japan, Central America and Russia. Admiral Sands' uncle, Maj. Richard Martin Sands (1791–1836), died during the Seminole War, and his cousin, Robert Martin Sands (1825–1903), was a lieutenant colonel in the 3rd Alabama Reg., Army of Northern Virginia, CSA. He was buried at Arlington National Cemetery, in Arlington, Virginia.

== Honored in ship naming ==
Two ships were named USS Sands for him and his son, James H. Sands:

- USS Sands (DD-243/APD-13), a Clemson-class destroyer, commissioned in 1920
- USS Sands (T-AGOR-6), an oceanographic research ship, placed in service in 1965
