= USNS Bartlett =

Research ship built in 1969

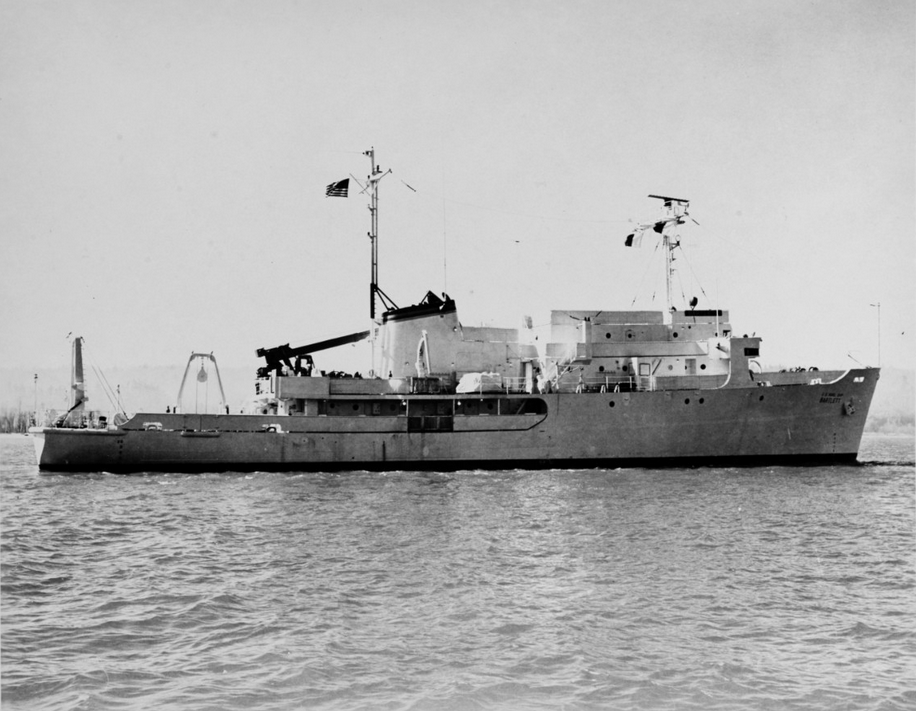
- USNS Bartlett (T-AGOR-13)

History

United States
- Name: USNS Bartlett
- Namesake: John R. Bartlett
- Awarded: 12 July 1965
- Builder: Northwest Marine Iron Works, Portland, Oregon
- Yard number: 54
- Laid down: 18 November 1965
- Launched: 24 May 1966
- Acquired: 31 March 1969 and assigned to the Military Sea Transportation Service
- Stricken: 30 August 1993
- Identification: T-AGOR-13
- Fate: Transferred to the Royal Moroccan Navy on 26 July 1993

Morocco
- Name: Abou El Barakat Al Barbari
- Identification: IMO number: 7742114
- Status: In active service

General characteristics
- Class & type: Robert D. Conrad-class oceanographic research ship
- Tonnage: 1,520 tons
- Length: 208 ft (63.4 m) (Note: Some sources give 245' overall length but Navy sources agree on 208'.)
- Beam: 39 ft (11.9 m)
- Draft: 16 ft (4.9 m)
- Propulsion: Diesel-electric, single propeller, 2,500 shp (1,900 kW), retractable azimuth-compensating bow thruster
- Speed: 12 knots (22 km/h; 14 mph)
- Complement: 23 civilian mariners, 38 scientists

USNS Bartlett (T-AGOR-13) was a Robert D. Conrad-class oceanographic research ship acquired by the U.S. Navy (USN) in 1969. She was named after oceanographer Captain John R. Bartlett of the USN. Bartlett was one of the ships under the technical direction of the Naval Oceanographic Office (NAVOCEANO) operating as an Auxiliary General Oceanographic Research (AGOR) program "pool" ship for support of Navy laboratories on each coast as well as NAVOCEANO projects. Its radio callsign was NBAD. The ship was first assigned to support laboratories on the West Coast with last operations in similar support on the East Coast and Atlantic.

In 1993 the ship was transferred to the Royal Moroccan Navy.

== U.S. service ==
=== Construction ===
Bartlett was built by the Northwest Marine Iron Works Portland, Oregon as hull number 54. (Note: De Steiguer (T-AGOR-12) was hull number 53.) The contract was awarded 12 July 1965 with the keel laid 18 November 1965 and launch on 24 May 1966. The ship was turned over to the Navy's Military Sea Transportation Service (MSTS) 31 March 1969. Bartlett was placed in service with MSTS in a ceremony on 15 April at the Oregon Mast, the foremast of USS Oregon (BB-3), on the seawall in Portland.

=== Service history ===
Bartlett was placed in service as a West Coast AGOR pool ship under the technical direction of the Naval Oceanographic Office. Later the ship was transferred for similar operation in the Atlantic. The ship, one of the last two of the type, had an active rudder in addition to a bow thruster.

The ship is mentioned in oceanographic reports and literature regarding the various projects of the laboratories which retained collected data and published their own reports from ship operations. In addition to the Navy laboratories universities or civilian laboratories with Navy contracts could utilize the ship through the Office of Naval Research (ONR). For example, the ship's use in planting two acoustic sources onto the top of Cobb Seamount between 25 and 30 July 1973 for an experiment is covered in a report of the Naval Research Laboratory. During October and November 1981 the ship did deep water trawls in the Venezuela Basin along with other observations and found some rare specimens that were deposited in a number of notable museums. In 1990 the ship spent some time in the North West Atlantic Ocean according to a data set of temperature and salinity measurements collected using CTD/XBT.

== Royal Moroccan Navy service ==
After being struck from the Navy List on 30 August 1993. Bartlett was approved on 26 July 1993 under the terms of the Security Assistance Program for a transfer to Morocco, where she then entered into service with the Moroccan Navy as Abou El Barakat Al Barbari.
