= USS Sands (DD-243) =

Clemson-class destroyer

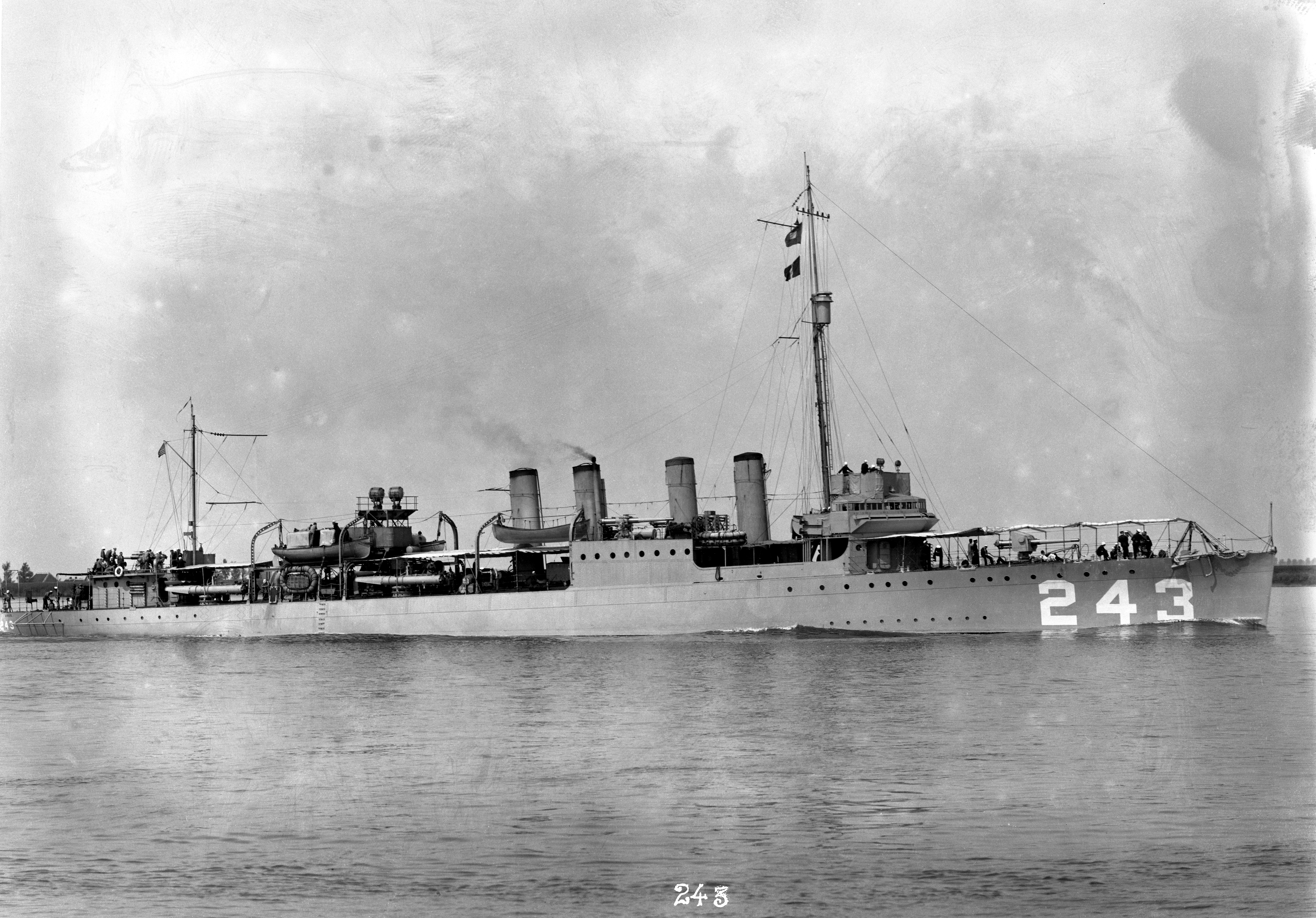
- USS Sands in Antwerp in 1921

History

United States
- Namesake: James H. Sands
- Builder: New York Shipbuilding
- Laid down: 22 March 1919
- Launched: 28 October 1919
- Commissioned: 10 November 1920
- Decommissioned: 10 October 1945
- Stricken: 1 November 1945
- Identification: call sign NULQ
- Fate: Sold for scrapping, 23 May 1946

General characteristics
- Class & type: Clemson-class destroyer
- Displacement: 1,190 tons
- Length: 314 ft 5 in (95.83 m)
- Beam: 31 ft 8 in (9.65 m)
- Draft: 10 ft (3.05 m)
- Installed power: geared turbines, 26,500 shp (20 MW)
- Propulsion: 2 screws
- Speed: 35 knots (65 km/h)
- Range: 4,900 nm @ 15 kn (9,100 km @ 28 km/h)
- Complement: 101 officers and enlisted
- Armament: 4 x 4 in (100 mm) guns, 1 x 3 in (76 mm) gun, 12 x 21 inch (533 mm) tt.

The first USS Sands (DD-243/APD-13) was a Clemson-class destroyer in the United States Navy, before and during World War II. She was the first ship named for Benjamin F. Sands and his son, James H. Sands.

== Construction ==
Sands was ordered from the New York Shipbuilding Corporation on 29 December 1917, and was laid down on 22 March 1919 at the New York Shipbuilding Corporation's, Camden, New Jersey shipyard. The ship was launched on 28 October 1919, sponsored by Miss Jane McCue Sands. Sands was commissioned on 10 November 1920.

== Service history ==
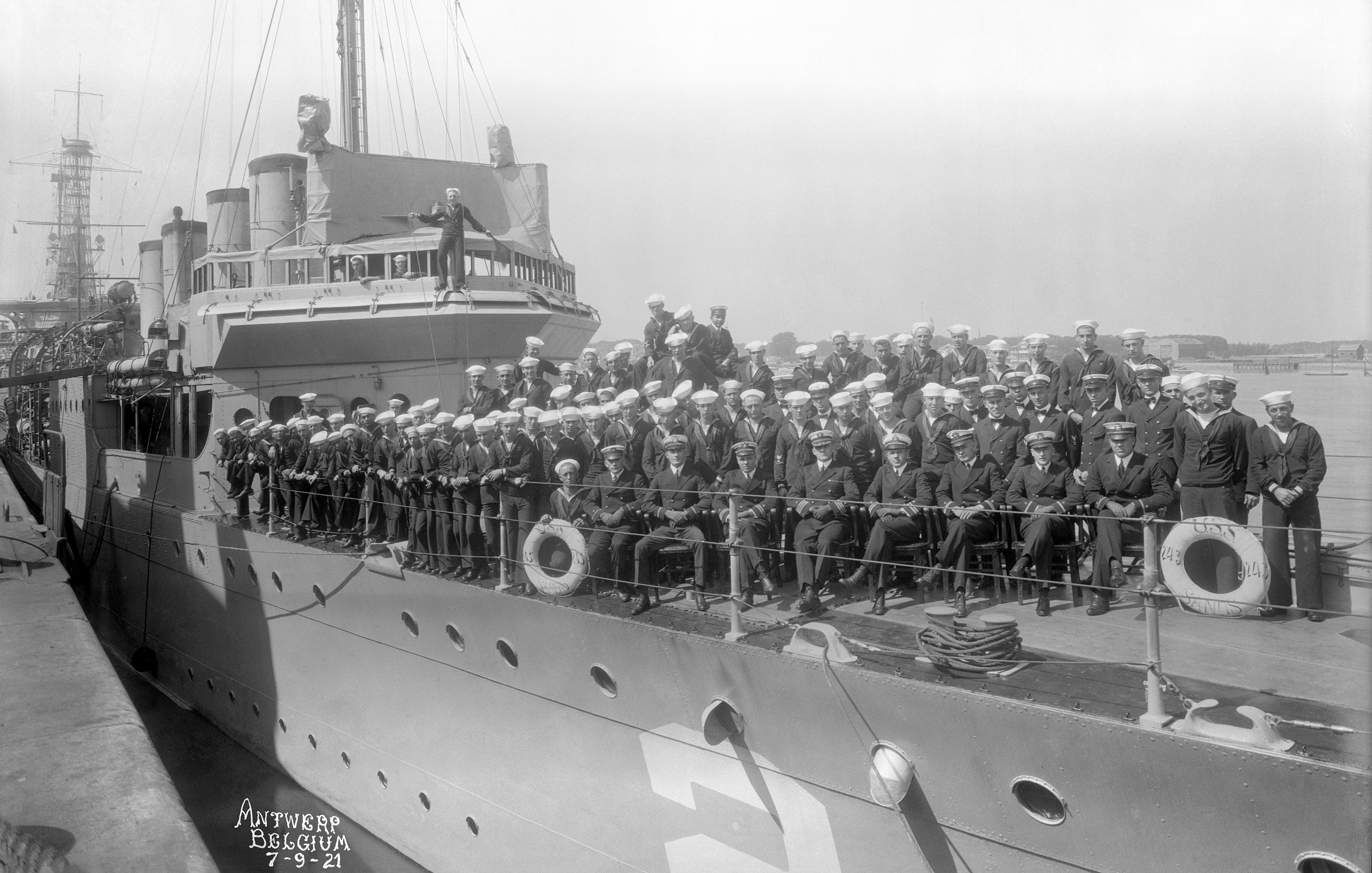
USS Sands' ship's company pose on her foredeck in Antwerp, Belgium, on 7 September 1921

=== 1920s ===
After commissioning, Sands remained at Philadelphia to fit out for European duty. On 14 December the destroyer departed from Philadelphia; steamed to Melville, Rhode Island, for torpedo outfit; then proceeded to New York. On 3 January 1921, she sailed for Europe. She arrived at Brest on the 16th and, for the next seven months, ran between French and British ports. In mid-August, she steamed for the Baltic; called at various ports on that sea, despite the still present danger of mines, and returned to Cherbourg on 27 September. Three weeks later, she left the French coast and headed for the eastern Mediterranean and the Black Sea. There, fighting between Greeks and Turks in coastal Asia Minor; between Turks and Armenians on the Anatolian plateau; and between Red and White forces in Russia had created problems including disease, poverty, and famine.

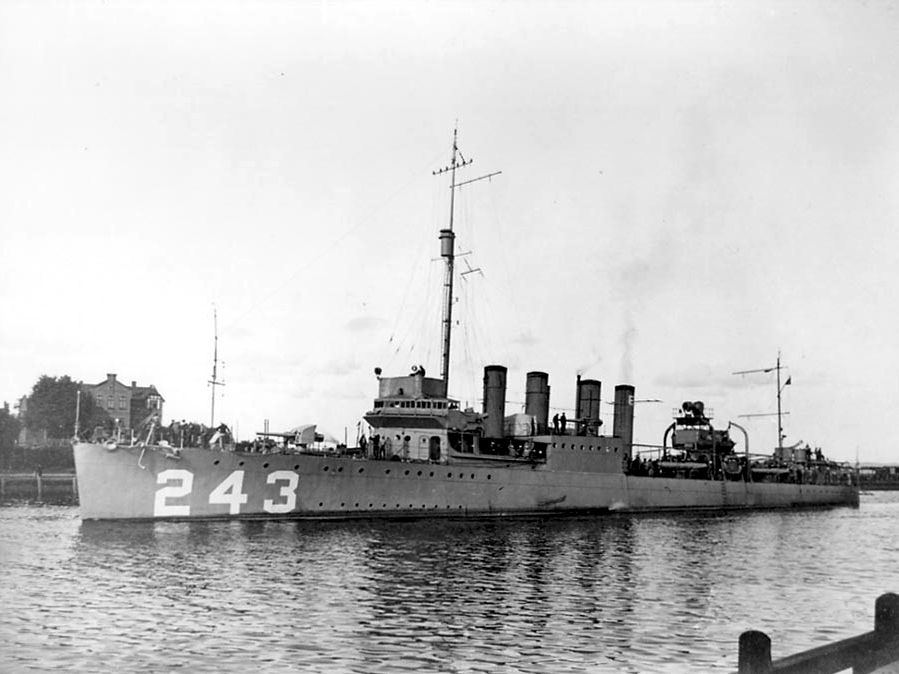
USS Sands in Danzig in 1921

Assigned to provide dispatch service to support American Relief Committee efforts, and to protect American nationals and interests, Sands arrived at Allied-occupied Istanbul on 11 November. Nine days later, she fueled at the Standard Oil docks at Selvi Bournu, then commenced her first cruise. Into late December, she steamed off Samsun and Trebizond, observing as Greeks were deported from those areas. After returning briefly to Istanbul, she steamed to Alexandretta, whence she continued on to Cilicia. There she called at Mersin, site of an American mission and relief distribution center, and remained through most of January 1922. On 3 February, she was back at Istanbul; and, on the 8th, she got underway for Novorossiysk. From the 8th to the 19th, she supported relief work in that city, then proceeded to Samsun where, with one interruption to retrieve a drifting barge near Inebole, she remained until 8 March. Two days later, she returned to Constantinople; and, on the 18th, she shifted to Selvi Bournu to assist in firefighting efforts in the oil storage area. With the fires under control, she put back into Istanbul and, on the 22d, got underway to again call at Mersin. By 7 April, she had retransited the Dardanelles and the Sea of Marmara. On 8 May, she passed through the Bosporus. From the 9th to the 22d, she was at Odessa, whence she shifted to Theodosia and then continued to Novorossisk. In early June, she was at Trabzon; and, on the 4th, she arrived at Samsun where, for several days, she steamed off the harbor entrance as Greek and Turkish forces exchanged fire.

Sands returned to Istanbul on 9 July and soon afterward sailed for Gibraltar and the United States. From August into November, she underwent overhaul at Philadelphia. By late December, she had joined the Scouting Fleet at New York; and, on 3 January 1923, she departed from that city for winter maneuvers in the Caribbean. In February, she participated in Fleet Problem I, an exercise designed to test the defenses of the Panama Canal. In March and April, she conducted operations in the Greater Antilles; and, in May, she moved back to the east coast. In July, after overhaul, she headed north to the New England coast. In the autumn, she commenced operations off the mid-Atlantic seaboard; and, in January 1924, she again sailed south for winter maneuvers.

=== 1930s ===
Through the decade and into the 1930s, Sands maintained a similar schedule. On 10 November 1930, however, after completing exercises off southern New England, she proceeded to Philadelphia, where she began inactivation. She was decommissioned on 13 February 1931 and was berthed at League Island until ordered activated in the summer of 1932.

Recommissioned on 21 July, the destroyer moved to Norfolk, Virginia; and, in August, she sailed for the west coast. On 8 September, she arrived at her new base, San Diego, California, and commenced operations off the southern California coast. With the new year, 1933, she steamed to Hawaii for fleet exercises, and, in mid-February, returned to California. In the spring, she operated off the coast of Washington; and, in July, she resumed exercises out of San Diego. Three months later, she joined Rotating Destroyer Squadron 20 and remained in reserve through the winter. Activated in April 1934, she joined Destroyer Division 9 and got underway for the Caribbean and fleet exercises. By mid-November, she was back in southern California, where she remained, with one interruption – Fleet Problem XVI in the North Pacific (May 1935) – until April 1936. She then returned to the east coast; participated in exercises in the Caribbean and off New England; and steamed back to San Diego in October. For the next two years, she operated primarily in the southern California area, with exercises in the Hawaiian Islands in the spring and autumn of 1937 and the spring of 1938. On her return in April 1938, she operated locally into the summer, then prepared for inactivation.

Sands was decommissioned at San Diego on 15 September 1938. Within a year, however, war broke out in Europe and the destroyer was ordered activated for Neutrality Patrol duty.

Recommissioned on 26 September 1939, Sands departed the west coast on 13 November and, a little over a month later, took up patrol duty in the Caribbean. She remained there into the spring of 1940, then moved north for patrol and escort duty off the eastern seaboard from the Virginia Capes to the Maritime Provinces. Before the end of the year, she returned to the Pacific and resumed operations off California.

=== World War II ===
With the entry of the United States into World War II, Sands commenced coastal escort work, which continued into the spring of 1942. Then, as the Japanese moved into the western Aleutian Islands, she shifted to Alaska and, through the summer, escorted convoys and conducted patrols from the mainland to ports in the eastern Aleutians. By fall, the Allies were taking the offensive, and Sands was needed for a different mission. On 28 October, she sailed south. Two days later, she was redesignated APD-13; and, on 5 November, she arrived at San Francisco for conversion to a high speed transport.

==== 1943 ====
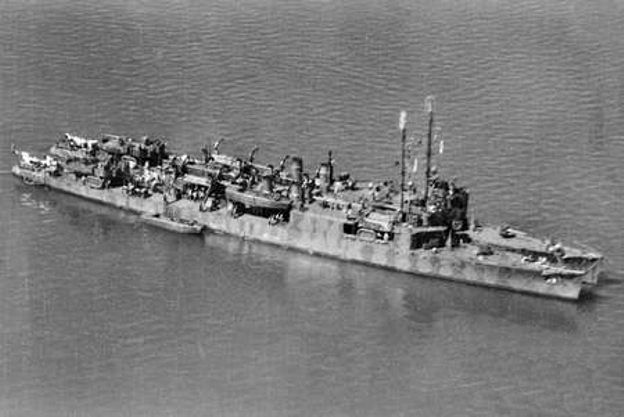
USS Humphreys (APD-12) and USS Sands (APD-13) at Townsville in May 1943.

Sands departed from San Francisco on 21 December. Steaming west, she reached Pearl Harbor at the end of the year; conducted exercises into January 1943; and, on the 8th, resumed her Pacific crossing. On the 22d, she arrived at Espiritu Santo and, as a transport and as an escort, began moving reinforcements and supplies into the Guadalcanal-Tulagi area. On the 29th, she was detached from duties at Tulagi and ordered to accompany Navajo, toward Rennell Island to assist Chicago. Rendezvousing the next morning, the tug took the damaged cruiser in tow, and Sands joined Chicago's escort of five destroyers in a circular screen. The eight ships then began making their way to Tulagi. At 1620, the formation was attacked by Japanese torpedo planes. Navajo began evasive maneuvers. Antiaircraft guns on Sands and the destroyers were fired at the intruders, but Chicago was hit by another torpedo and, 20 minutes later, sank.

Sands, with nine wounded by the explosion of a 20 millimeter shell, picked up over 300 survivors and steamed for Espiritu Santo. Arriving on 1 February, she conducted amphibious exercises from the 4th to the 10th; completed another escort run to Guadalcanal and back by the 14th; and, on the 15th, with more marines embarked, steamed back to the Solomon Islands. Five days later, she departed Tulagi; crossed over to Koli Point; and, on the 21st, moved on to the Russell Islands; that night, she landed her assault troops unopposed; then returned to Tulagi, from where she made two more transport runs to the assault area before the 26th.

After the occupation of the Russells, Sands continued to carry troops and supplies and to escort convoys in the New Caledonia-New Hebrides-Solomons area. With spring, she was transferred to the 7th Amphibious Force. On 14 May, she departed the New Hebrides; and, on the 20th, she arrived at Townsville, Australia, with an LST convoy.

Through the summer, she performed escort and patrol missions along the Queensland coast and completed numerous transport missions to move Allied forces up to, and along, the northern coast of the Papuan peninsula. By September, the forces were ready to move against Japanese positions on the Huon Peninsula and contest control of Vitiaz and Dampier Straits.

On 2 September, Sands embarked units of the 9th Australian Division, veterans of the North African desert and, two days later, landed them east of Lae. On the 5th, she retired, returning a few days later to shell the Japanese garrison at Lae as Allied forces closed on that village from the jungle and from mangrove swamps. At mid-month, she resumed transport and escort duties along the coast; and, on the 22d, she landed troops just north of Finschhafen.

Reinforcement-escort runs and amphibious exercises along the coast, from Port Moresby to the Huon Peninsula and between Papua and offshore islands, occupied October and November. In early December, at Goodenough Island, she loaded units of the 112th Cavalry Regiment for the assault on New Britain. On the 15th, she offloaded the troops into rubber landing boats which were to take them onto the Amalut Peninsula. The Japanese, however, opened fire before the boats reached the beach. Covering units, not knowing if the troops had landed, held their fire for fear of hitting the cavalrymen. Twelve of the 15 boats, riddled by Japanese fire, sank. Most surviving troops swam seaward. Sands and the escorting destroyer opened fire, silencing the coastal guns. The search for survivors began, and all but 16 were rescued.

Eleven days later, Sands returned to New Britain for another assault landing. On the 26th, she landed marines on Cape Gloucester, provided gunfire support as they moved off the beaches, then retired to stage for her next target, Saidor.

==== 1944 ====
On 1 January 1944, the APD again departed Good-enough Island with assault troops embarked. A unit of Task Group 76.1, she transited Vitiaz Strait that night and, at 0735 on the 2nd, landed the troops on the beach at Saidor, 115 miles west of Finschhafen. By 0800, she was out of the transport area. In the afternoon, she returned to Buna roads and, until mid-month, made runs between there and Capes Cretin and Sudest.

On the 18th, Sands arrived at Sydney for a brief respite. On the 28th, she got underway to return to New Guinea with cargo and personnel for Milne Bay, Buna, and Cape Sudest. From 6 to 24 February, she completed another run to Sydney; then, on the 27th, loaded troops at Cape Sudest for transport to the assault beaches at Los Negros Island, Admiralties. Sailing on the 29th, she crossed the Bismarck Sea; arrived off the assault area shortly after 0730 the next day; dispatched her loaded LCP(R)s to the departure line by 0742; then, as the first waves reached the shore, commenced gunfire support operations. At 0835, Sands's boats hit the beach with the 3rd assault wave. The intense crossfire which had caught earlier waves continued as they approached. Poor organization on the beach slowed offloading and assisted the accuracy of the Japanese defenders. Sands suffered two casualties, one killed, one seriously injured, from her boat crews and lost her no. 1 boat.

In mid-afternoon, the APD departed the Los Negros-Manus area. Returning to Cape Sudest, she loaded much-needed reinforcements on 3 March and, the next day, disembarked them on the contested island and took on casualties. On the 5th, she was back at Cape Sudest, from where she resumed escort duty along the coast.

In early April, Sands trained army units in amphibious exercises. On the 18th, she embarked units of the 162nd Infantry and got underway for Humboldt Bay. Steaming with TG 77.2, the Central Attack Group for the Hollandia operation, she arrived in the transport area early on the morning of the 22nd. At 0600, her boats were lowered and loaded. Five minutes later, they were en route to the departure line. At 0735, they returned and were hoisted on board. The APD then took up gunfire support duties.

On the 24th, Sands returned to Cape Cretin, and from there proceeded to Cape Sudest for availability. In May, she resumed escort and transport runs but, at mid-month, interrupted them to return to California.

After an overhaul at Alameda, Sands carried passengers to Pearl Harbor; embarked 126 men of the 81st Division Reconnaissance Company there, and arrived in the Solomons on 24 August to rehearse the Palau operation. Two weeks later, she steamed northwest, arriving in the transport area off Anguar Island on the 15th. Acting as reserve for the Peleliu Island assault, she remained off Anguar during the initial landings on the former island. At mid-morning, she shifted to Peleliu to support the forces ashore. On the 17th, she returned to Anguar and, on the 18th, landed the reconnaissance company on Red Beach. On the 19th, she went alongside Harris; embarked the 323nd Reconnaissance Company and then, with Rathburne, proceeded to Ulithi. There until the 25th, she landed her troops without opposition, then got underway to return to Hollandia. Arriving on the 28th, she shifted to Manus on the 29th; equipped her boats with mine-sweeping gear, embarked minesweeping personnel, and, on 10 October, steamed for Leyte with units of Mine Squadron 2.

Despite poor weather and two appendectomies which were performed aboard ship, Sands arrived in the approaches to Leyte Gulf on the 17th. On the 18th, she closed Suluan Island, took off reconnaissance troops landed previously by Crosby and transferred them to that ship. On the 19th, she moved up to the assault area and lowered her LCP(R)s to conduct shallow water minesweeping operations. From 1155 to 1410, she covered her boats as they swept the approaches to Red and White beaches near Tacloban. Straddled, but not hit, by Japanese batteries, the boats completed their mission and returned to the APD. Sands then shifted to the Dulag beaches, where her boats conducted further shallow water sweeps.

During the night, Sands patrolled in Leyte Gulf. In the morning, she returned to the Tacloban area to provide gunfire support there. In the afternoon, she shifted to the Dulag area for the same purpose; and, on the 21st, she got underway to return to New Guinea.

==== 1945 ====
In November, the APD conducted a resupply and reinforcement run to Leyte and back, then prepared for the invasion of Luzon. On 27 December, she departed Hollandia for the Palaus and Leyte. On 2 January 1945, she left San Pedro Bay. On the 4th, Japanese aerial resistance began. The next day, her task group, 77.2, steamed up the Luzon coast. Land-based Japanese aircraft again attacked. On the 6th, the force arrived off Lingayen Gulf and, despite kamikaze accuracy; the ships entered the gulf and took up their stations. Sands, with other APDs, bombarded Santiago Island. On the 7th, she covered the YMSs as they conducted sweeps, and then closed Orange and Green beaches to cover underwater demolition teams as they removed obstacles from the landing area. On the 8th, she moved to the transport area where she remained, on patrol, until the 13th. She then got underway for Leyte and Ulithi.

The APD arrived in the Western Carolines on the 24th and remained through February. On 1 March, she joined a convoy for Iwo Jima, arrived on the 3rd, patrolled through the 5th, and sailed for Saipan on the 6th, escorting retiring transports. From the Marianas, she sailed to the Solomons, New Caledonia, and the Admiralties, from where she returned to Ulithi to escort reinforcements to the Ryukyus. By mid-June, she had completed three runs to the Okinawa area and had begun her last Pacific crossing. On the 30th, she arrived at Pearl Harbor, and, on 11 July, she returned to San Diego.

Sands remained on the west coast through the end of hostilities. On 29 August, she got underway for Philadelphia, where she was decommissioned on 10 October 1945. Struck from the Navy list on 1 November, she was sold for scrapping to the Boston Metals Company the following spring.

== Awards ==
Sands earned nine battle stars for her World War II service.
