= USNS De Steiguer =

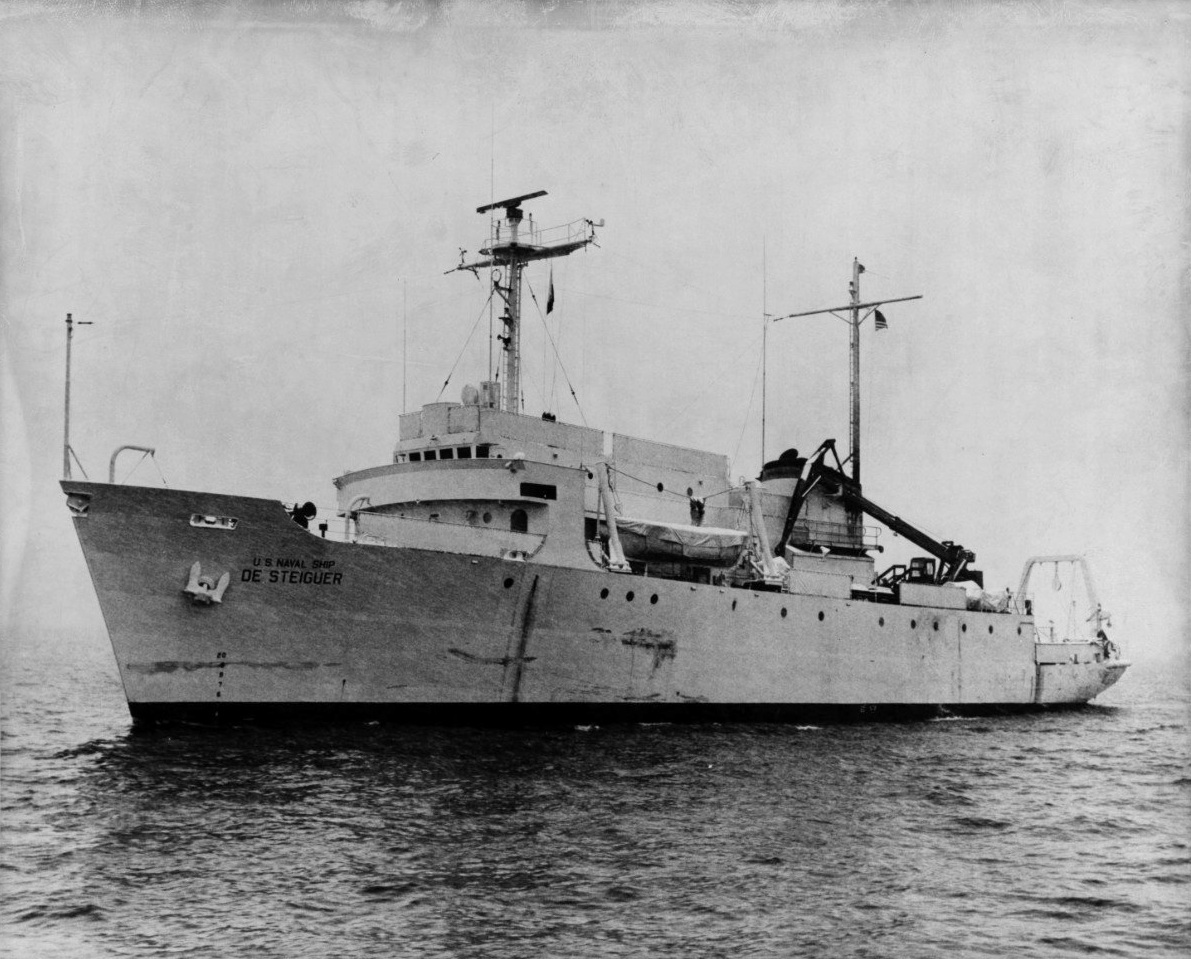
- USNS De Steiguer at sea

History

United States
- Name: USNS De Steiguer
- Namesake: Admiral Louis R. de Steiguer
- Builder: Northwest Marine Iron Works, Portland, Oregon
- Laid down: 12 November 1965
- Launched: 21 March 1966
- Acquired: by the U.S. Navy, 28 February 1969, as USNS De Steiguer (T-AGOR-12)
- In service: Leased to a university in 1969
- Out of service: not known
- Stricken: not known
- Identification: IMO number: 7742138
- Fate: Transferred to the Tunisian Navy on 2 November 1992

Tunisia
- Name: Salammbo (A-701)
- Acquired: 2 November 1992
- Identification: IMO number: 7742138

General characteristics
- Type: Robert D. Conrad-class oceanographic research ship
- Displacement: 1,520 tons light, 1,915 tons full load
- Length: 208 ft (63 m)
- Beam: 40 ft (12 m)
- Draft: 16 ft (4.9 m)
- Propulsion: diesel-electric, single propeller, 2,500shp, retractable azimuth-compensating bow thruster
- Speed: 12 knots
- Complement: 23 civilian mariners, 38 scientists
- Armament: none

USNS De Steiguer (T-AGOR-12) was a Robert D. Conrad-class oceanographic research ship acquired by the U.S. Navy in 1966. She was a Navy pool vessel assigned to Naval laboratories until she was transferred to the Tunisian Navy in 1992.

== Built in Portland, Oregon ==
De Steiguer was built by the Northwest Marine Iron Works, Portland, Oregon. She was laid down on 12 November 1965 and launched on 21 March 1966 and turned over to the Navy on 28 February 1969, as USNS De Steiguer (T-AGOR-12).

== Oceanographic service ==
De Steiguer was a U.S. Navy oceanographic research ship assigned to support Naval laboratories. De Steiguer was one of two AGOR ships, the other was Bartlett (T-AGOR 13), assigned as pool vessels for west coast Naval laboratory use according to a 1970 report. Bartlett and De Steiguer were assigned to the U.S. Naval Oceanographic Office for operation.

== Inactivation ==
On 2 November 1992 De Steiguer was approved under the terms of the Security Assistance Program for a transfer to Tunisia, where she now serves the Tunisian Navy as Salammbo (A-701).

== Note ==
There is no information on De Steiguer in the Dictionary of American Naval Fighting Ships.

== See also ==
- United States Navy
- Oceanography
