= Blake baronets of Menlough (1622) =

Baronetcy in Ireland

Escutcheon of the Blake baronets of Menlough

The Blake baronetcy, of Menlough in the County of Galway, was created in the Baronetage of Ireland on 10 July 1622 for Valentine Blake, Mayor of Galway in 1611 and 1630 and a member of the Irish House of Commons for County Galway. His father Walter Blake (died 1574) had preceded him as Mayor, in 1547 and 1562.

The 2nd Baronet was a member of the Irish Parliament for Galway Town. The 3rd Baronet represented both County Galway and Galway Town in Parliament. The 6th Baronet was a member of the Irish House of Commons for County Galway. He was the first notable Catholic in Ireland to join William of Orange.

The 12th Baronet represented Galway Borough in the British House of Commons. The 14th Baronet was High Sheriff of County Galway in 1872.

== Blake baronets, of Menlough (1622) ==
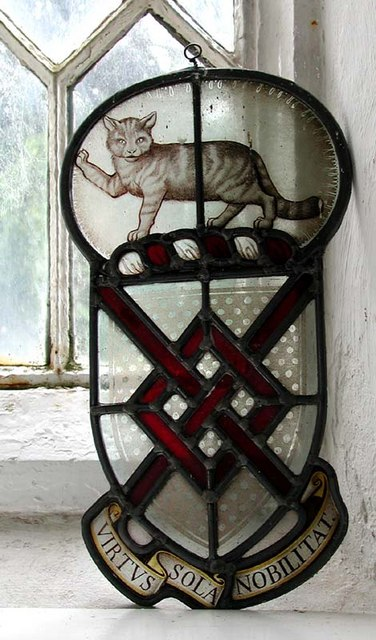
Coat of arms of the Blakes of Menlough in St Mary's Church, Congerstone, Leics. Argent a fret gules, crest a cat passant guardant proper. Motto: Virtus sola nobilitat.

- Sir Valentine Blake, 1st Baronet (died 1635)
- Sir Thomas Blake, 2nd Baronet (died c. 1640)
- Sir Valentine Blake, 3rd Baronet (died 1652)
- Sir Thomas Blake, 4th Baronet (died c. 1670)
- Sir Valentine Blake, 5th Baronet (died c. 1672)
- Sir Walter Blake, 6th Baronet (died 1748)
- Sir Thomas Blake, 7th Baronet (died 1749)
- Sir Ulick Blake, 8th Baronet (died 1766)
- Sir Thomas Blake, 9th Baronet (died 1787)
- Sir Walter Blake, 10th Baronet (died 1802)
- Sir John Blake, 11th Baronet (1753–1834)
- Sir Valentine John Blake, 12th Baronet (1780–1847)
- Sir Thomas Edward Blake, 13th Baronet (1805–1875)
- Sir Valentine Blake, 14th Baronet (1836–1912), owned Menlough Castle. His daughter, Eleanor, was killed in a fire in the castle two years before his death.
- Sir Thomas Patrick Ulick John Harvey Blake, 15th Baronet (1870–1925)
- Sir Ulick Temple Blake, 16th Baronet (1904–1963), found dead in his car after inheriting Menlough Castle from the fourteenth baronet.
- Sir Thomas Richard Valentine Blake, 17th Baronet (1942–2008), last of the 11th Baronet's male line.
- Sir Anthony Teilo Bruce Blake, 18th Baronet (1951–2014), great-great-great-great-grandson of the 10th Baronet through his 2nd son, Dominck Joseph Blake (1754–1843).
- Sir Charles Valentine Bruce Blake, 19th baronet (born 1994).

The heir presumptive is Jonathan Luttrell Blake (born 1953), a cousin of the present holder.
