= Edward Grey, 1st Viscount Grey of Fallodon =

British Liberal statesman (1862–1933)

The Right Honourable The Viscount Grey of Fallodon KG BT PC DL FZS
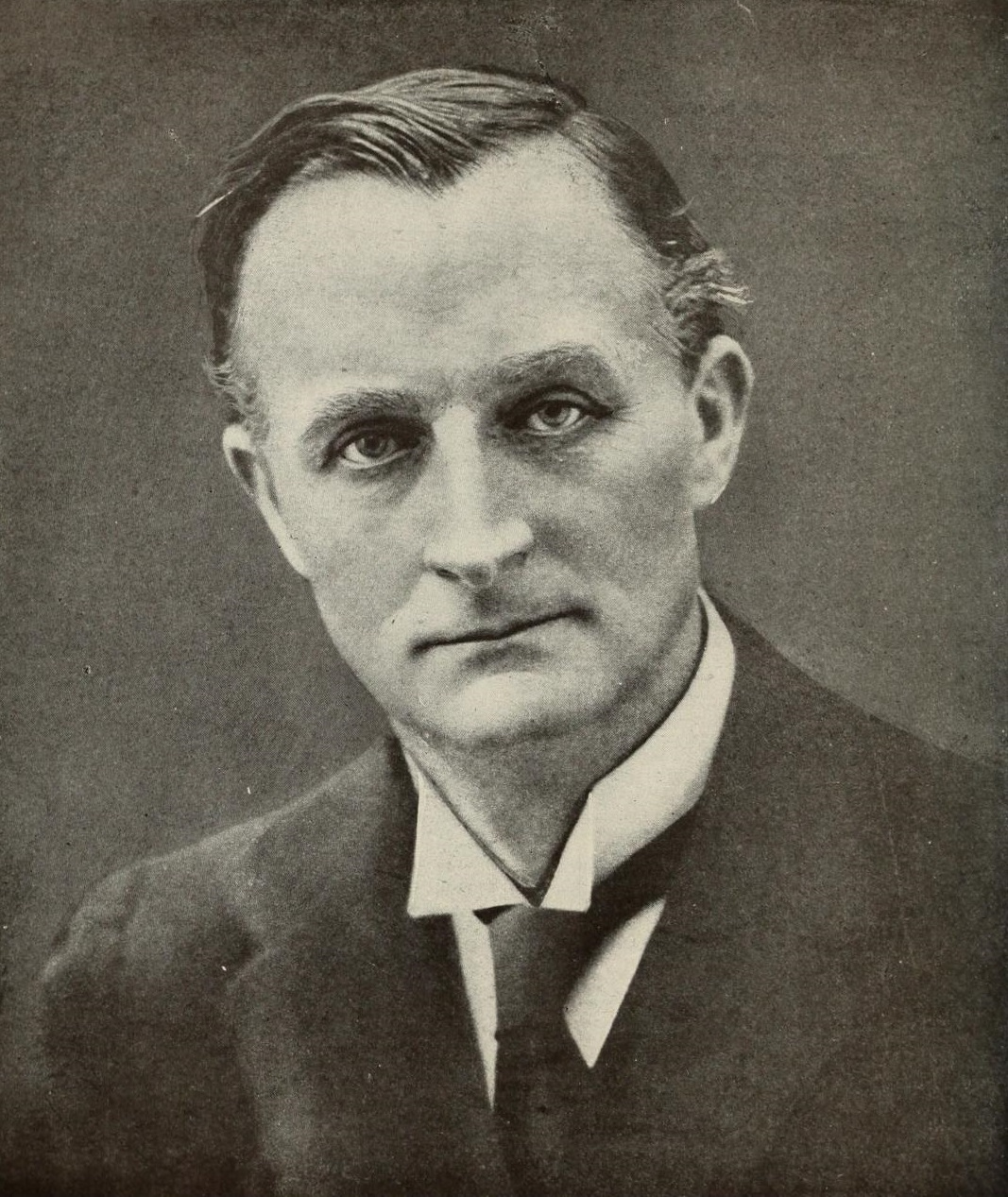

British Ambassador to the United States
- In office September 1919 – March 1920
- Nominated by: David Lloyd George
- Appointed by: George V
- Preceded by: The Marquess of Reading
- Succeeded by: Sir Auckland Geddes

Secretary of State for Foreign Affairs
- In office 10 December 1905 – 10 December 1916
- Prime Minister: Sir Henry Campbell-Bannerman; H. H. Asquith
- Preceded by: The Marquess of Lansdowne
- Succeeded by: Arthur Balfour

Parliamentary Under-Secretary of State for Foreign Affairs
- In office 18 August 1892 – 20 June 1895
- Prime Minister: William Ewart Gladstone; The Earl of Rosebery
- Preceded by: James Lowther
- Succeeded by: George Curzon

Member of the House of Lords
- Lord Temporal
- Hereditary peerage 27 July 1916 – 7 September 1933
- Preceded by: Peerage created
- Succeeded by: Peerage extinct

Member of Parliament for Berwick-upon-Tweed
- In office November 1885 – July 1916
- Preceded by: Hubert Jerningham; David Milne Home
- Succeeded by: Sir Francis Blake

Personal details
- Born: 25 April 1862 London, England
- Died: 7 September 1933 (aged 71) Fallodon, England
- Party: Liberal
- Spouses: Dorothy Widdrington (m. 1885; died 1906) Pamela Tennant, Baroness Glenconner (m. 1922; died 1928)
- Relations: House of Grey
- Education: Balliol College, Oxford
- Profession: Politician

Edward Grey, 1st Viscount Grey of Fallodon (25 April 1862 – 7 September 1933), better known as Sir Edward Grey, was a British statesman and Liberal Party politician who was the main force behind British foreign policy in the era of the First World War.

A proponent of social reform who adhered to the "New Liberalism", he served as Foreign Secretary from 1905 to 1916, the longest continuous tenure of any holder of that office. He renewed the 1902 Anglo-Japanese Alliance in 1911. The centrepiece of his policy was the defence of France against German aggression, while avoiding a binding alliance with Paris. He supported France in the Moroccan crises of 1905 and 1911. Another major achievement was the Anglo-Russian Convention of 1907. He resolved an outstanding conflict with Germany over the Baghdad railway in 1913. His most important action came in the July Crisis in 1914, when he led Britain into World War I against Germany. He convinced the Liberal cabinet that Britain had an obligation and was honour-bound to defend France, and prevent Germany from controlling Western Europe. Once the war began, there was little role for his diplomacy; he lost office in December 1916. By 1919 he was a leading British supporter of the League of Nations.

Grey is remembered for his "the lamps are going out" remark on 3 August 1914 on the outbreak of the First World War. He signed the Sykes-Picot Agreement on 16 May 1916. He was ennobled in 1916, prior to which he was the 3rd Baronet Grey of Fallodon, and was Ambassador to the United States between 1919 and 1920 and Leader of the Liberal Party in the House of Lords between 1923 and 1924.

== Background, education and early life ==
Grey was the eldest of the seven children of Colonel George Henry Grey and Harriet Jane Pearson, daughter of Charles Pearson. His grandfather Sir George Grey, 2nd Baronet of Fallodon, was also a prominent Liberal politician, while his great-grandfather Sir George Grey, 1st Baronet of Fallodon, was the third son of Charles Grey, 1st Earl Grey, and the younger brother of Prime Minister Charles Grey, 2nd Earl Grey. He was also a cousin of two later British Foreign Secretaries: Anthony Eden and Lord Halifax. Grey attended Temple Grove School from 1873 until 1876. His father died unexpectedly in December 1874, and his grandfather assumed responsibility for his education, sending him to Winchester College.

Grey went on to Balliol College, Oxford, in 1880 to read Literae Humaniores. Apparently an indolent student, he was tutored by Mandell Creighton during the vacations and managed a second class in Honour Moderations. He subsequently became more idle, using his time to become university champion at real tennis. In 1882 his grandfather died and he inherited a baronet's title, an estate of about 2,000 acres (8.1 km^{2}), and a private income. Returning to Oxford in the autumn of 1883, Grey switched to studying jurisprudence (law) in the belief that it would be an easier option, but by January 1884 he had been sent down but allowed to return to sit his final examination. Grey returned in the summer and achieved Third Class honours in Jurisprudence. Though he was entitled to receive a BA, he never received one. He would receive an honorary doctorate of law from Oxford in 1907.

Grey left university with no clear career plan and in the summer of 1884 he asked a neighbour and relative, Lord Northbrook, at the time First Lord of the Admiralty, to find him "serious and unpaid employment." Northbrook recommended him as a private secretary to his kinsman Sir Evelyn Baring, the British consul general to Egypt, who was attending a conference in London. Grey had shown no particular interest in politics whilst at university, but by the summer of 1884 Northbrook found him "very keen on politics," and after the Egyptian conference had ended found him a position as an unpaid assistant private secretary to Hugh Childers, the Chancellor of the Exchequer.

In 1898 Grey became a director of the North Eastern Railway, later becoming Chairman (1904-5; curtailed by his appointment as Foreign Secretary). In Twenty-Five Years (see Works, below) Grey later wrote that '...the year 1905 was one of the happiest of my life; the work of Chairman of the Railway was agreeable and interesting...'. After leaving the Foreign Office Grey resumed his directorship of the NER in 1917, and when the North Eastern Railway became part of the London and North Eastern Railway he became a director of that company, remaining in this position until 1933. At the Railway Centenary celebrations in July 1925, Grey accompanied the Duke and Duchess of York and presented them with silver models of the engine Locomotion and the passenger carriage Experiment.

Two of Grey's brothers were killed by wild animals in Africa: George was mauled by a lion in 1911, and Charles was felled by a buffalo in 1928. His other brother, Alexander, was a vicar in Trinidad and died there aged 48 from the after-effects of a childhood cricket injury.

== Early political career ==
Grey was selected as the Liberal Party candidate for Berwick-upon-Tweed where his Conservative opponent was Earl Percy. He was duly elected in November 1885 and, at 23, became the youngest MP (Baby of the House) in the new House of Commons. He was not called in the Home Rule debate, but was nonetheless convinced by William Ewart Gladstone and John Morley of the rightness of the cause. A year later Grey summoned up the courage to make a maiden speech, at a similar period to Asquith. During the debate over the 1888 Land Purchase Bill he began "an association and friendship" with R. B. Haldane, which was "thus strengthened as years went on". The nascent imperialists voted against "this passing exception". On a previous occasion he had met Neville Lyttelton, later a knight and general, who would become his closest friend.

Grey retained his seat in the 1892 election with a majority of 442 votes and to his surprise was made Under-Secretary of State for Foreign Affairs by Gladstone (albeit after his son Herbert had refused the post) under the Foreign Secretary, Lord Rosebery. Grey would later claim that at this point he had had no special training nor paid special attention to foreign affairs. The new Under-Secretary prepared the policy for making Uganda a new colony, proposing to build a railway from Cairo through East Africa, though later limiting government funds being used to build it. There was continuity in presentation and preparation during the Scramble for Africa; foreign policy was not an election issue. The Liberals continued to incline towards the Triple Alliance, causing the press to write of a "Quadruple Alliance".

Grey later dated his first suspicions of future Anglo-German disagreements to his early days in office, after Germany had sought commercial concessions from Britain in the Ottoman Empire; in return they would promise support for the British position in Egypt. "It was the abrupt and rough peremptoriness of the German action that gave me an unpleasant impression"; not, he added, that the German position was at all "unreasonable," rather that the "method... was not that of a friend." With hindsight, he argued in his autobiography, "the whole policy of the years from 1886 to 1904 [might] be criticized as having played into the hands of Germany."

=== 1895 statement on French expansion in Africa ===
Grey in 1895

Prior to the Foreign Office vote on 28 March 1895, Grey asked Lord Kimberley, the new Foreign Secretary, for direction as to how he should answer any question about French activities in West Africa. According to Grey, Kimberley suggested "pretty firm language." In fact, West Africa was not mentioned, but when pressed on possible French activities in the Nile Valley Grey stated that a French expedition "would be an unfriendly act and would be so viewed by England." According to Grey the subsequent row both in Paris and in the Cabinet was made worse by the failure of Hansard to record that his statement referred explicitly to the Nile Valley and not to Africa in general. The statement was made before the dispatch of the Marchand Mission—indeed, he believed it might have actually provoked it—and as Grey admits did much to damage future Anglo-French relations.

The Liberal Party lost a key vote in the House of Commons on 21 June 1895, and Grey was among the majority in his party that preferred a dissolution to continuing. He seems to have left office with few regrets, noting, "I shall never be in office again and the days of my stay in the House of Commons are probably numbered. We [he and his wife] are both very glad and relieved ..." The Liberals were soundly defeated in the subsequent general election, although Grey added 300 votes to his own majority. He was to remain out of office for the next ten years, but was sworn of the Privy Council on 11 August 1902, following an announcement of the King's intention to make this appointment in the 1902 Coronation Honours list published in June that year.

He was appointed a deputy lieutenant of Northumberland in 1901.

== Foreign Secretary 1905–1916 ==
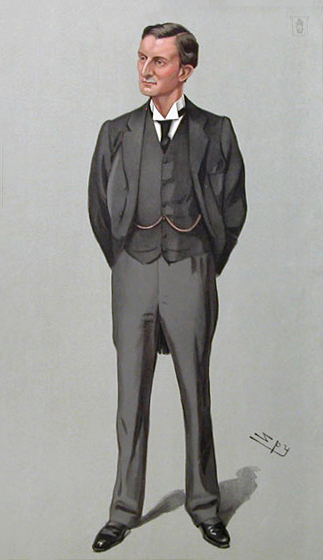
Grey caricatured by Spy for Vanity Fair, 1903

With the Conservative government of Arthur Balfour divided and unpopular, there was some speculation that H. H. Asquith and his allies Grey and Richard Haldane would refuse to serve in the next Liberal government unless the Liberal leader Sir Henry Campbell-Bannerman accepted a peerage, which would have left Asquith as the real leader in the House of Commons. The plot (called the "Relugas Compact" after the Scottish lodge where the men met) collapsed when Asquith agreed to serve as Chancellor of the Exchequer under Campbell-Bannerman. When Campbell-Bannerman formed a government in December 1905 Grey was appointed Foreign Secretary—the first Foreign Secretary to sit in the Commons since 1868. Haldane became Secretary of State for War. The party won a landslide victory in the 1906 general election. Whilst an MP, he voted in favour of the 1908 Women's Enfranchisement Bill. When Campbell-Bannerman stepped down as prime minister in 1908, Grey was Asquith's only realistic rival to succeed his friend. In any event, Grey continued as Foreign Secretary, and held office for 11 years to the day, the longest continuous tenure in that office.

=== Anglo-Russian Entente 1907 ===
As early as 13 December 1905, Grey had assured the Russian Ambassador Count Alexander Benckendorff that he supported the idea of an agreement with Russia. Negotiations began soon after the arrival of Sir Arthur Nicolson as the new British Ambassador in June 1906. In contrast with the previous Conservative government that had seen Russia as a potential threat to the empire, Grey's intention was to re-establish Russia "as a factor in European politics" on the side of France and Great Britain to maintain a balance of power in Europe.

=== Agadir Crisis 1911 ===
Grey did not welcome the prospect of a renewed crisis over Morocco: he worried that it might either lead to a re-opening of the issues covered by the Treaty of Algeciras or that it might drive Spain into alliance with Germany. Initially Grey tried to restrain both France and Spain, but by the spring of 1911 he had failed on both counts. Grey believed that, whether he liked it or not, his hands were tied by the terms of the Entente cordiale. The despatch of the German gunboat Panther to Agadir served to strengthen French resolve and, because he was determined both to protect the agreement with France and also to block German attempts at expansion around the Mediterranean, it pushed Grey closer to France. Grey, however, tried to calm the situation, merely commenting on the "abrupt" nature of the German intervention, and insisting that Britain must participate in any discussions about the future of Morocco.

In cabinet on 4 July 1911, Grey accepted that Britain would oppose any German port in the region, any new fortified port anywhere on the Moroccan coast, and that Britain must continue to enjoy an "open door" for its trade with Morocco. Grey at this point was resisting efforts by the Foreign Office to support French intransigence. By the time a second cabinet was held on 21 July, Grey had adopted a tougher position, suggesting that he propose to Germany that a multi-national conference be held, and that were Germany to refuse to participate "we should take steps to assert and protect British interests."

Grey was made a Knight Companion of the Garter in 1912. Throughout the period leading up to World War Grey played a leading part in negotiations with Kaiser Wilhelm II. He visited Germany and invited their delegation to the Windsor Castle Conference in 1912. They returned several times, with Haldane acting as interpreter.

=== July Crisis 1914 ===
Although Grey's activist foreign policy, which relied increasingly on the Triple Entente with France and Russia, came under criticism from the radicals within his own party, he maintained his position because of support from the Conservatives for his "non-partisan" foreign policy. In 1914, Grey played a key role in the July Crisis leading to the outbreak of World War I. His attempts to mediate the dispute between Austria-Hungary and Serbia were ignored by both sides. On 16 July, Maurice de Bunsen, British ambassador to Austria-Hungary advised that Austria-Hungary regarded the Serbian government as having been complicit in the assassination of Archduke Franz Ferdinand and his wife Sophie, and would have to act if Austria-Hungary was not to lose her position as a Great Power. The British Cabinet were preoccupied with the crisis in Ulster, and Grey failed to realize the urgency of the situation, and chose to await further developments.

On 23 July, Austria-Hungary formally handed the Serbian government an ultimatum, which demanded their acceptance, by 25 July, of terms tantamount to Serbia's vassalage to Austria-Hungary; it was soon clear that Serbia would accept most of the demands but that Austria-Hungary would settle for nothing less than complete capitulation. On 24 July, the French ambassador in London tried to waken Grey to the realization that once Austrian forces crossed the Serbian border, it would be too late for mediation. Grey responded by urging the German ambassador to attempt a four-power conference of Britain, France, Italy and Germany at Vienna to mediate between Austria-Hungary and Russia, Serbia's patron, or at least to obtain an extension of the time-limit set by Austria-Hungary. Grey again proposed a four-power conference on 26 July. He also suggested that Russia and Austria-Hungary should be encouraged to negotiate. The other powers were open to the idea, but Germany, France and Russia were not supporting this.

Following the collapse of Grey's four-power talks on Tuesday 28 July, it was clear that war on the continent was now inevitable, although it was not yet certain whether Britain should be involved. Asquith, Grey and Haldane had a late night talk at the Foreign Office. On Wednesday 29 July two decisions were taken at Cabinet. Firstly, the Armed Forces were placed on alert (the "Precautionary Period" was declared and the War Book was opened at 2pm). Secondly, the Cabinet agreed to guarantee the neutrality of Belgium, but that Britain's response to any violation of Belgian neutrality would be decided on grounds of policy rather than strict legality. Grey was authorised to tell the German and French ambassadors that Britain had not yet made a decision as to whether or on what terms to join in or stand aside. Besides issues of party management (many Liberal MPs, including at least a third of the Cabinet, and the Liberal press apart from The Westminster Gazette, wanted Britain to stay out), Asquith and Grey genuinely believed that openly backing France and Russia would make them more intransigent, without necessarily deterring Germany. On Friday 31 July Grey had a "rather painful" interview with Paul Cambon, the French Ambassador, at which he resisted Cambon's pressure to back France openly.

King George V telegraphed Berlin to confirm that Grey had stated that Britain would remain neutral if France and Russia were not attacked. By 31 July, when Grey finally sent a memorandum demanding that Germany respect Belgium's neutrality, it was too late. German forces were already massed at the Belgian border, and Helmuth von Moltke convinced Kaiser Wilhelm II it was too late to change the plan of attack.

At a meeting with Karl Max, Prince Lichnowsky, the German Ambassador, early on 1 August, Grey stated the conditions necessary for Britain to remain neutral, but perhaps with a lack of clarity. Grey did not make it clear that Britain would not ignore a breach of the Treaty of London (1839), to respect and protect the neutrality of Belgium. Nor it seems did he make it clear that Britain would support Russia, for at 11:14 AM that morning, Lichnowsky sent a telegram to Berlin which indicated that Grey had proposed that, if Germany were not to attack France, Britain would remain neutral. Saturday 1 August saw a difficult Cabinet from 11am to 1.30pm. The Cabinet were divided, but (with the notable exception of Winston Churchill) predominantly against war. Grey threatened to resign if the Cabinet pledged not to intervene in any circumstances. Asquith's private preference was to stay out, but he gave Grey staunch support and reckoned he would have to resign if Grey did. Overnight Germany issued an ultimatum to Russia and France. The first of two Cabinets on Sunday 2 August was from 11am to 2pm. After much difficulty it was agreed that Grey should tell Cambon and the Germans that the Royal Navy would not allow the Imperial German Navy to conduct hostile operations in the Channel (the French Navy was concentrated in the Mediterranean, under an Anglo-French naval agreement of 1912).

On Monday 3 August, Germany declared war on France and broke the old London treaty by invading Belgium. That afternoon Grey made an hour-long speech to the House of Commons. As Grey stood at a window in the Foreign Office, watching the lamps being lit as dusk approached on 3 August, he is famously said to have remarked to the editor of The Westminster Gazette, "The lamps are going out all over Europe. We shall not see them lit again in our lifetime."

United by the need to assist France as promised, and hold the Liberal party together lest the warmongering Conservatives take power, the Cabinet voted almost unanimously for war, with only John Burns and Viscount Morley resigning. On the afternoon of Tuesday 4 August the House of Commons was informed that an ultimatum had been given to Germany expiring midnight Berlin time (11pm in London). In terms of public appeal, the Liberals made a great deal of German violation of Belgian neutrality, but this was not the main cause for its decision to go to war.

In his memoirs published in 1925 Grey gave his retrospective analysis of the causes of the war:

More than one true thing may be said about the causes of the war, but the statement that comprises the most truth is that militarism and the armaments inseparable from it made war inevitable....After 1870 Germany had no reason to be afraid, but she fortified herself with armaments and the Triple Alliance in order that she might never have reason to be afraid in the future. France naturally was afraid after 1870, and she made her military preparations and the Dual Alliance (with Russia). Britain, with a very small Army and a very large Empire, became first uncomfortable and then (particularly when Germany began a big-fleet programme) afraid of isolation. She made the Anglo-Japanese Alliance, made up her quarrels with France and Russia, and entered the Entente. Finally, Germany became afraid that she would presently be afraid and struck the blow while she believed her power to be invincible.

Historians studying the July crisis typically conclude that Grey:

was not a great foreign secretary but an honest, reticent, punctilious English gentleman.... He exhibited a judicious understanding of European affairs, a firm control of his staff, and a suppleness and tact in diplomacy, but he had no boldness, no imagination, no ability to command men and events. [Regarding the war] He pursued a cautious, moderate policy, one that not only fitted his temperament, but also reflected the deep split in the Cabinet, in the Liberal party, and in public opinion.

=== First World War ===
Following the outbreak of World War I, the conduct of British foreign policy was increasingly constrained by the demands of a military struggle beyond Grey's control. During the war, Grey worked with the Marquess of Crewe to press an initially reluctant ambassador to the United States, Sir Cecil Spring Rice, to raise the issue of the Hindu–German Conspiracy with the American government; this ultimately led to the unfolding of the entire plot.

In the early years of the war, Grey oversaw negotiation of important secret agreements with new allies (Italy and the Arab rebels) and with France and Russia (the Sykes–Picot Agreement) which, among other provisions, assigned postwar control of the Turkish Straits to Russia. Otherwise, Asquith and Grey generally preferred to avoid discussion of war aims for fear of raising an issue that might fracture the Entente. In a 12 February 1916 paper the new Chief of the Imperial General Staff William Robertson proposed that the Allies offer a separate peace to Turkey, or offer Turkish territory to Bulgaria to encourage Bulgaria to break with the Central Powers and make peace, so as to allow British forces in that theatre to be redeployed against Germany. Grey replied that Britain needed her continental allies more than they needed her, and imperial interests could not incur the risk (e.g., by reneging on the promise that Russia was to have control of the Turkish Straits) that they might choose to make a separate peace, which would leave Germany dominant on the continent.

Grey retained his position as Foreign Secretary when Asquith's Coalition Government (which included the Conservatives) was formed in May 1915. Grey was one of those Liberal ministers who contemplated joining Sir John Simon (Home Secretary) in resigning in protest at the conscription of bachelors, due to be enacted in January 1916, but he did not do so. In late 1916 American President Woodrow Wilson secretly promoted a compromise peace to both sides of the war. Both sides rejected the offer. Germany thought that with the defeat of Russia it had enough troops, and new tactics, to win a decisive victory on the Western front. The British cabinet was hostile. Grey was the only senior leader who supported Wilson's proposal, but his influence was declining. The best he could do was to soothe Wilson's hurt feelings and prevent a possible rupture with Washington.

In an attempt to reduce his workload, he left the House of Commons for the House of Lords in July 1916, accepting a peerage as Viscount Grey of Fallodon, in the County of Northumberland. When Asquith's ministry collapsed in December 1916 and David Lloyd George became Prime Minister, Grey went into opposition.

=== Later career ===
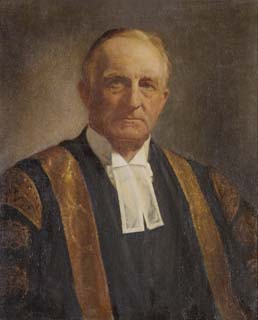
Lord Grey of Fallodon

Grey became President of the League of Nations Union in 1918. In 1919 he was appointed Ambassador to the United States, with responsibility for encouraging that country join the League of Nations. Grey's eyesight had deteriorated to near blindness by this stage and his appointment was a short-term one, for five months until 1920. He dealt with the issue of Irish independence, but failed to convince the U.S. to ratify the Treaty of Versailles. During his stay in the U.S. Grey was unable to obtain a meeting with President Woodrow Wilson, a fact which he attributed to the influence of the Irish lobby, although Wilson had in fact suffered a severe stroke at the start of October 1919, but this was not widely known for several months.

By mid July 1920 Lord Robert Cecil, a moderate and staunchly pro-League of Nations Conservative, was keen for a party realignment under Grey, who was also a strong supporter of the League. Grey had been irritated by Asquith's failure to congratulate him on his Washington appointment, but they reestablished relations in November 1920. Asquith reached an agreement with Grey on 29 June 1921, suggesting that he could be Leader in the Lords and Lord President of the Council in any future Liberal Government, as his eyesight was no longer good enough to cope with the paperwork of running a major department. Grey wanted British troops simply pulled out of Ireland and the Irish left to sort themselves out, a solution likened by Roy Jenkins to the British withdrawal from India in 1947.

The success of Anti-Waste League candidates at by-elections made leading Liberals feel that there was a strong vote which might be tapped by a wider-based and more credible opposition to Lloyd George's Coalition government. Talks between Grey and Lord Robert Cecil also began in June 1921. A wider meeting (Cecil, Asquith, Grey, and leading Liberals Lord Crewe, Walter Runciman and Sir Donald Maclean) was held on 5 July 1921. Cecil wanted a genuine coalition rather than a de facto Liberal government, with Grey rather than Asquith as prime minister, and an official manifesto by himself and Grey which the official Liberal leaders Asquith and Lord Crewe would then endorse. Another Conservative, Sir Arthur Steel-Maitland, later joined in the talks, and his views were similar to Cecil's, but Maclean, Runciman and Crewe were hostile. Grey himself was not keen, and his eyesight would have been a major handicap to his becoming prime minister. He missed the third meeting, saying that he was feeding squirrels in Northumberland, and was late for the fourth. He did, however, make a move by speaking in his former constituency in October 1921, to little effect, after which the move for a party realignment fizzled out.

Grey continued to be active in politics despite his near blindness, serving as Leader of the Liberal Party in the House of Lords from 1923 until his resignation shortly before the 1924 election on the grounds that he was unable to attend on a regular basis. Having declined to stand for Chancellor of the University of Oxford in 1925, to make way for Asquith's unsuccessful bid, he was elected unopposed as in 1928 and held the position until his death in 1933.

== Personal life ==
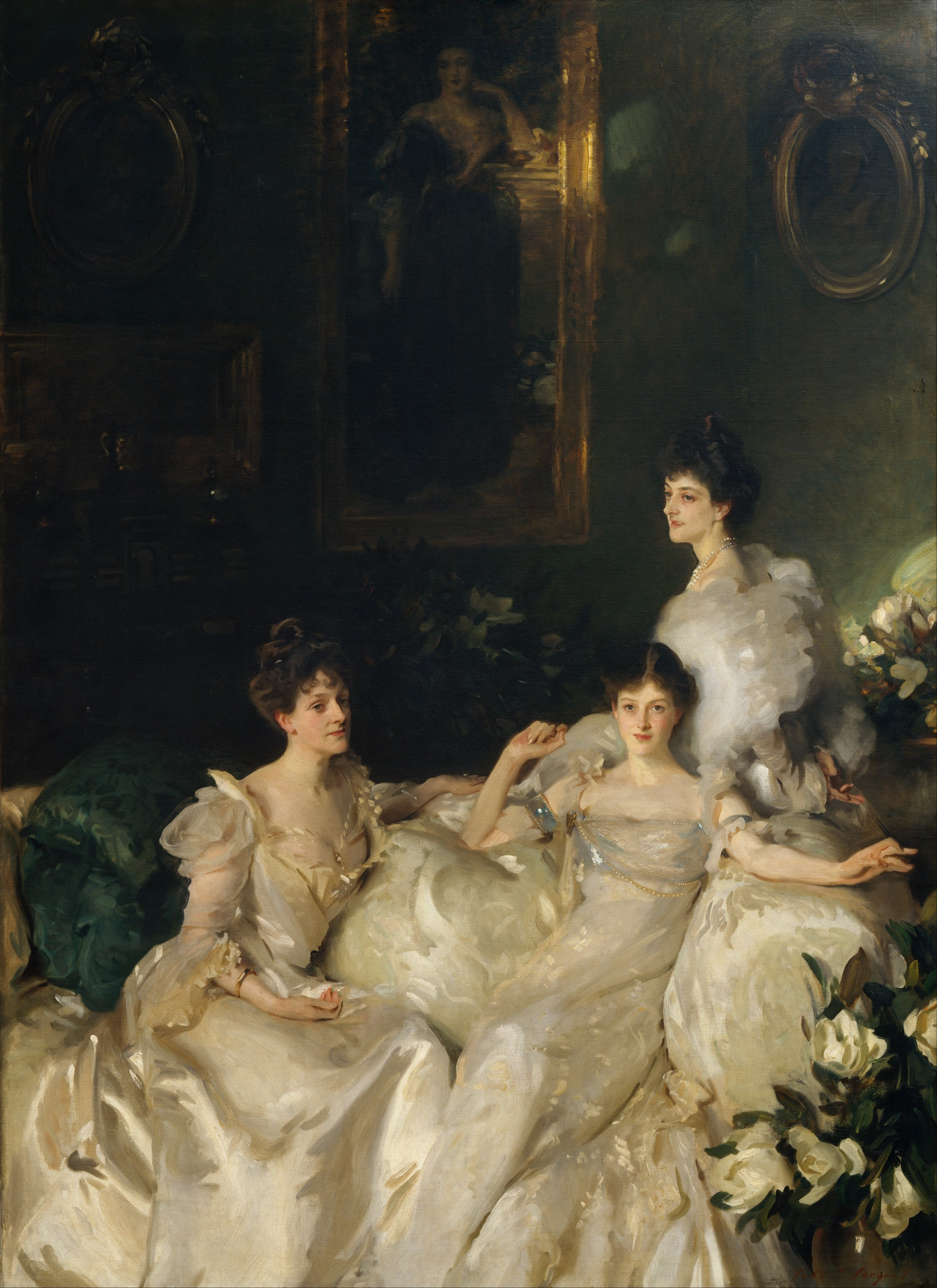
The Wyndham Sisters, by John Singer Sargent, 1899 (Metropolitan Museum of Art)

Grey married Dorothy, daughter of S. F. Widdrington, of Newton Hall, Northumberland, in 1885. They enjoyed a close relationship, sharing a fondness for peaceful rural pursuits at their country residence by the River Itchen, Hampshire. After her death in a road accident in February 1906, Grey remained single until marrying Pamela Adelaide Genevieve Wyndham, daughter of the Honourable Percy Wyndham and widow of Lord Glenconner, in 1922. There were no offspring from either marriage. According to Max Hastings, however, Grey had two illegitimate children as a result of extra-marital affairs. Edward James claimed that his sister Audrey Evelyn James, officially the daughter of William Dodge James and Evelyn Elizabeth Forbes, was actually one of the children of Grey.

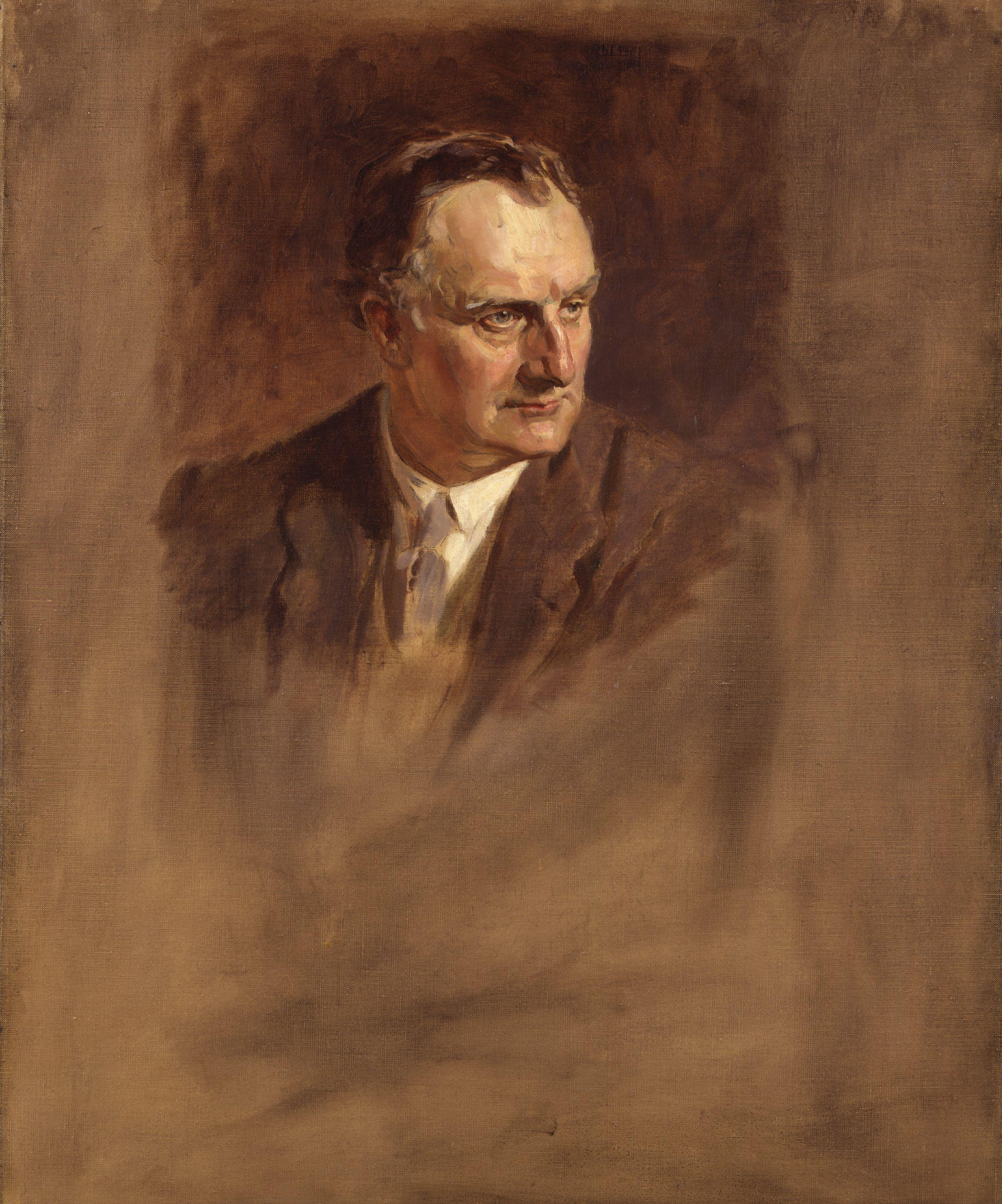
Portrait of Sir Edward Grey by James Guthrie, circa 1924–1930.

During his university years Grey represented his college at football and was also an excellent tennis player being Oxford champion in 1883 (and winning the varsity competition the same year) and won the British championship in 1889, 1891, 1895, 1896 and 1898. He was runner-up in 1892, 1893 and 1894, years in which he held office. He was also a lifelong fly fisherman, publishing a book, Fly Fishing, on his exploits in 1899, which remains one of the most popular books ever written on the subject. He continued to fish by touch after his deteriorating eye-sight meant he was no longer able to see the fly or a rising fish. He was also an avid ornithologist; one of the best-known photographs of him shows him with a robin perched on his hat; The Charm of Birds was published in 1927. In 1933 he was one of eleven people (Note: The letter was signed: Desborough; Hugh S. Gladstone; Grey of Fallodon; Julian S. Huxley (Chancellor of Oxford University); T. G Longstaff; Percy R. Lowe; P. Chalmers Mitchell; Rothschild; Scone M.P. (Chairman, British Trust for Ornithology); E. L. Turner; H. F. Witherby (President, British Ornithologists' Union)) involved in the appeal that led to the foundation of the British Trust for Ornithology (BTO), an organisation for the study of birds in the British Isles. He was, along with his fellow Liberal Haldane, one of the original members of the Coefficients dining club of social reformers set up in 1902 by the Fabian campaigners Sidney and Beatrice Webb.

== Death ==
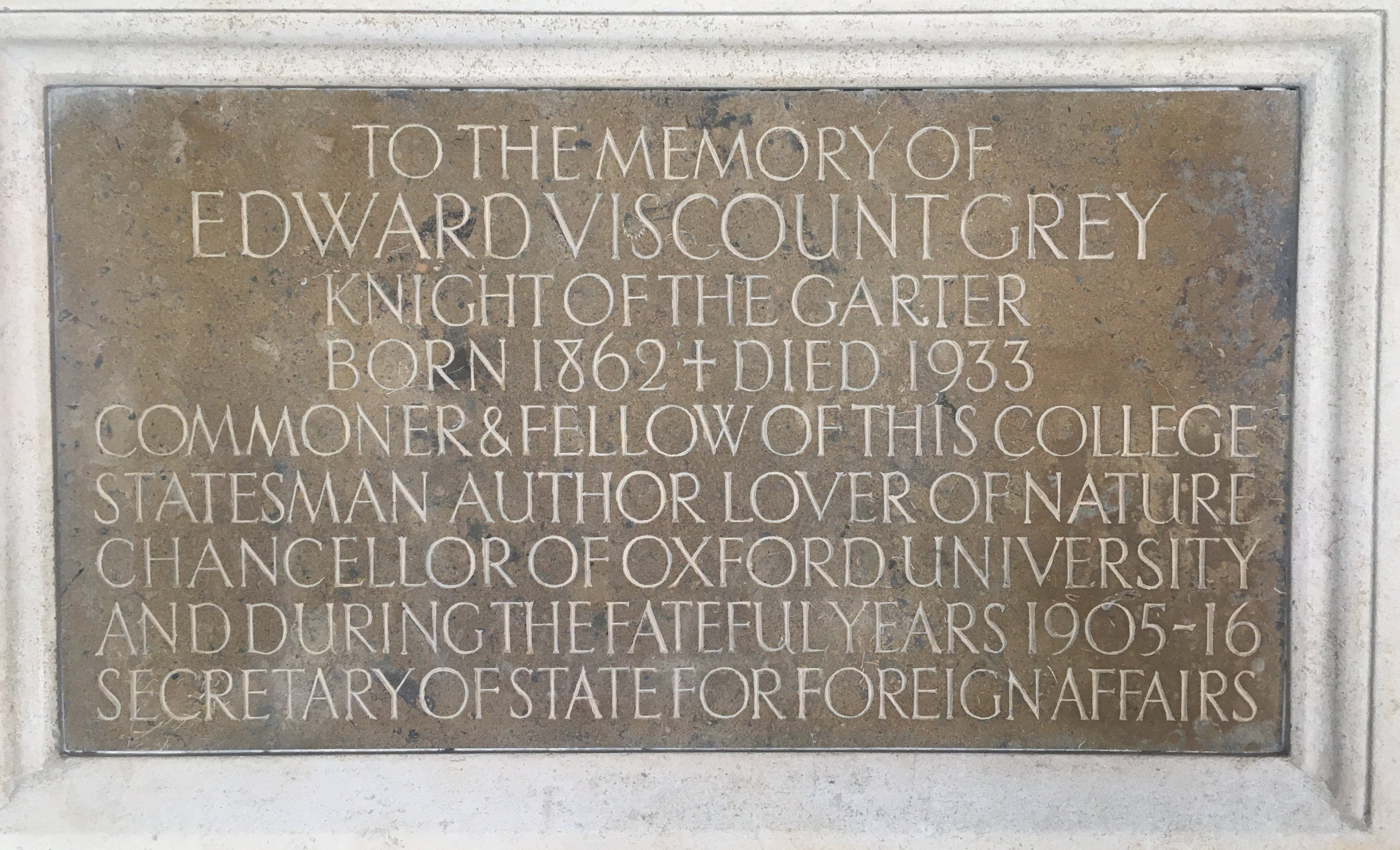
Edward Grey memorial, Winchester College

Lady Grey of Fallodon died on 18 November 1928. Lord Grey of Fallodon remained a widower until his own death at Fallodon on 7 September 1933, aged 71, following which his body was cremated at Darlington. The viscountcy became extinct on his death, though he was succeeded in the baronetcy by his cousin, Sir George Grey. Grey is commemorated at Winchester College; by a relief next to the Ambassador's entrance to the Foreign Office in Downing Street, London; by a bronze plaque at the summit of Ros Castle hill, Northumberland, one of his favourite viewpoints; by an inscription on the outer wall near the main entrance to The Great North Museum: Hancock in Newcastle-upon-Tyne (recording his presidency of the Natural History Society of Northumbria), and by the establishment of the Edward Grey Institute of Field Ornithology at Oxford University. The railway workers at Fallodon planted a copper beech tree in his memory at the site of the private station. His ashes were interred with those of his wife Dorothy in woodland on the Fallodon estate, below a simple stone reading "Here, among trees that they planted together, are placed the ashes of Edward and Dorothy Grey."

== Works ==
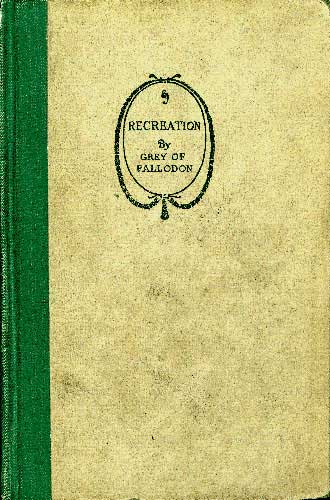
Cover of Grey's Recreation, 1920

- Fly Fishing (1899, 1929 two new chapters were added)
- Cottage Book. Itchen Abbas, 1894–1905 (1909)
- On Sea trout (1913 essay, published in book form 1994)
- The League of Nations . London: Oxford University Press. 1918.
- Recreation (1920)
- Twenty-Five Years, 1892–1916. (1925)
- Fallodon Papers (1926)
- The fly-fisherman (1926 essay, published in book form 1994)
- The Charm of Birds (Hodder and Stoughton, 1927)

== Honours ==
Country	Date	Appointment	Post-nominal letters
United Kingdom	11 August 1902 – 7 September 1933	Member of His Majesty's Most Honourable Privy Council	PC
United Kingdom	12 February 1912 – 7 September 1933	Knight Companion of the Order of the Garter	KG
England		Deputy Lieutenant of the County of Northumberland	DL

== Arms ==
Coat of arms of Edward Grey, 1st Viscount Grey of Fallodon
Crest A scaling ladder in bend sinister Or hooked and pointed Sable. Escutcheon Gules a lion rampant within a bordure engrailed Argent a mullet for difference. Motto De Bon Vouloir Servir Le Roy (To Serve The King With Good Will)

=== Scholastic ===
Chancellor, visitor, governor, rector and fellowships

Location	Date	School	Position
England	1928 – 7 September 1933	University of Oxford	Chancellor

=== Memberships and Fellowships ===
Country	Date	Organisation	Position
United Kingdom	26 November 1914 – 7 September 1933	Royal Society	Fellow (FRS) – Elected under Statute 12
United Kingdom	– 7 September 1933	Zoological Society of London	Fellow (FZS)

== See also ==
- British entry into World War I
- Liberal government, 1905–1915
- Timeline of British diplomatic history#1897-1919
- Edward Grey Institute of Field Ornithology

== Sources ==
- Jenkins, Roy (1964). Asquith (first ed.). London: Collins. OCLC 243906913.
- Koss, Stephen (1985). Asquith. London: Hamish Hamilton. ISBN 978-0-231-06155-1.
- Otte, Thomas G. (2020). Statesman of Europe : a life of Sir Edward Grey. [London], UK. ISBN 978-0-241-41336-4. OCLC 1198445572.

Parliament of the United Kingdom
Preceded by David Home; Hubert Jerningham	Member of Parliament for Berwick-upon-Tweed; 1885–1916	Succeeded by Sir Francis Blake
Political offices
Preceded by James Lowther	Parliamentary Under-Secretary of State for Foreign Affairs; 1892–1895	Succeeded by George Curzon
Preceded by Henry Petty-Fitzmaurice, 5th Marquess of Lansdowne	Foreign Secretary; 1905–1916	Succeeded by Arthur Balfour
Party political offices
Preceded by Robert Crewe-Milnes, 1st Marquess of Crewe	Leader of the Liberal Party in the House of Lords; 1923–1924	Succeeded by William Lygon, 7th Earl Beauchamp
Business positions
Preceded by Matthew White Ridley, 1st Viscount Ridley	Chairman of the North Eastern Railway; 1904–1905	Succeeded by John Lloyd Wharton
Diplomatic posts
Preceded by Rufus Isaacs, 1st Earl of Reading	British Ambassador to the United States; 1919–1920	Succeeded by Sir Auckland Geddes
Academic offices
Preceded by George Cave, 1st Viscount Cave	Chancellor of the University of Oxford; 1928–1933	Succeeded by Lord Irwin
Peerage of the United Kingdom
New creation	Viscount Grey of Fallodon; 1916–1933	Extinct
Baronetage of the United Kingdom
Preceded by George Grey	Baronet (of Fallodon); 1882–1933	Succeeded by Charles George Grey
