= Blake baronets of Tillmouth Park (1907) =

Escutcheon of the Blake baronets of Tillmouth Park

The Blake baronetcy, of Tillmouth Park in Cornhill in the County of Northumberland, was created in the Baronetage of the United Kingdom on 22 July 1907 for Francis Blake, subsequently Member of Parliament for Berwick-upon-Tweed. He was the son of Francis Blake, who had inherited Twizell and Tillmouth estates from Sir Francis Blake, 3rd Baronet of the 1774 creation. As of 2026 the title is held by the 1st Baronet's grandson, the 3rd Baronet, who succeeded his father in 1950.

== Blake baronets, of Tillmouth Park (1907) ==
- Sir Francis Douglas Blake, 1st Baronet (1856–1940)
- Sir (Francis) Edward Colquhoun Blake, 2nd Baronet (1893–1950)
- Sir Francis Michael Blake, 3rd Baronet (born 1943)

The heir apparent to the baronetcy is Francis Julian Blake (born 1971), eldest son of the 3rd Baronet.

== Notes ==
Baronetage of the United Kingdom
Preceded by Barlow baronets	Blake baronets of Tillmouth Park; 22 July 1907	Succeeded by Bowring baronets
