= Tomás Laighléis =

Tomás Laighléis (1895 - 1984) was a traditional Irish Seanchaí or storyteller.

A native of Menlo, County Galway, Laighléis was a seanchaí of local history and of Fianna tales. A selection of his recorded tales, was published in 1977 but contains only a fraction of his output.

== See also ==
- Robin Lawless, died 1260.
