= Mionlach =

Mionlach is the Irish language name of two localities in Ireland:

- Mionlach, County Galway, a Gaeltacht village and townland within the boundaries of Galway City
- Menlough, a village in northeast of County Galway
- Mionlach, a left-wing Irish-language current affairs magazine
