= Blake baronets of Twizell Castle (1774) =

Escutcheon of the Blake baronets of Twizell Castle

The Blake baronetcy, of Twizell Castle in the County of Durham, was created in the Baronetage of Great Britain on 25 May 1774 for Francis Blake, a collateral descendant of the 1st Baronet of the first creation. He inherited, with other property, the ruined Twizell Castle.

The 3rd Baronet sat as Member of Parliament for Berwick-upon-Tweed. The title became extinct on his death in 1860.

== Blake baronets, of Twizell Castle (1774) ==
- Sir Francis Blake, 1st Baronet (c. 1709–1780)
- Sir Francis Blake, 2nd Baronet (c. 1737–1818)
- Sir Francis Blake, 3rd Baronet (c. 1774–1860)

== Notes ==
Baronetage of Great Britain
Preceded by Lemon baronets	Blake baronets of Twizell Castle; 25 May 1774	Succeeded by Folkes baronets
