= Sir Francis Blake, 2nd Baronet, of Twizell Castle =

English landowner (1737-1818)

Sir Francis Blake (c.1737 – 22 May 1818) was a High Sheriff of Northumberland (1784), a major land owner of that county, and a political writer.

He succeeded to the Baronetcy of Twizell Castle on the death of his father Sir Francis Blake, 1st Baronet, of Twizell Castle in 1780.

He inherited substantial Northumberland estates including Twizell Castle, Tillmouth House, Seghill and Fowberry Tower, the latter being sold in 1807. He also purchased, in 1788, a 1,600-acre (6.5 km^{2}) estate at Duddo from John Clavering of Callaly Castle for £1400 which his son sold in 1823 for £45000.

His seat was initially at Fowberry and later at Tillmouth.

Blake married Elizabeth née Douglas of Broxbourne, Hertfordshire in 1772, and was succeeded by their eldest son Francis

== Works ==
- The Efficacy of a Sinking Fund of one Million per annum Considered, 1786
- The Propriety of an Actual Payment of the Public Debt Considered, 1786
- The True Policy of Great Britain Considered, 1787

Baronetage of Great Britain
Preceded by Francis Blake	Baronet (of Twizell Castle); 1780–1818	Succeeded by Francis Blake
