= Menlo, County Galway =

Mionlach Menlo/Menlough
- Townland
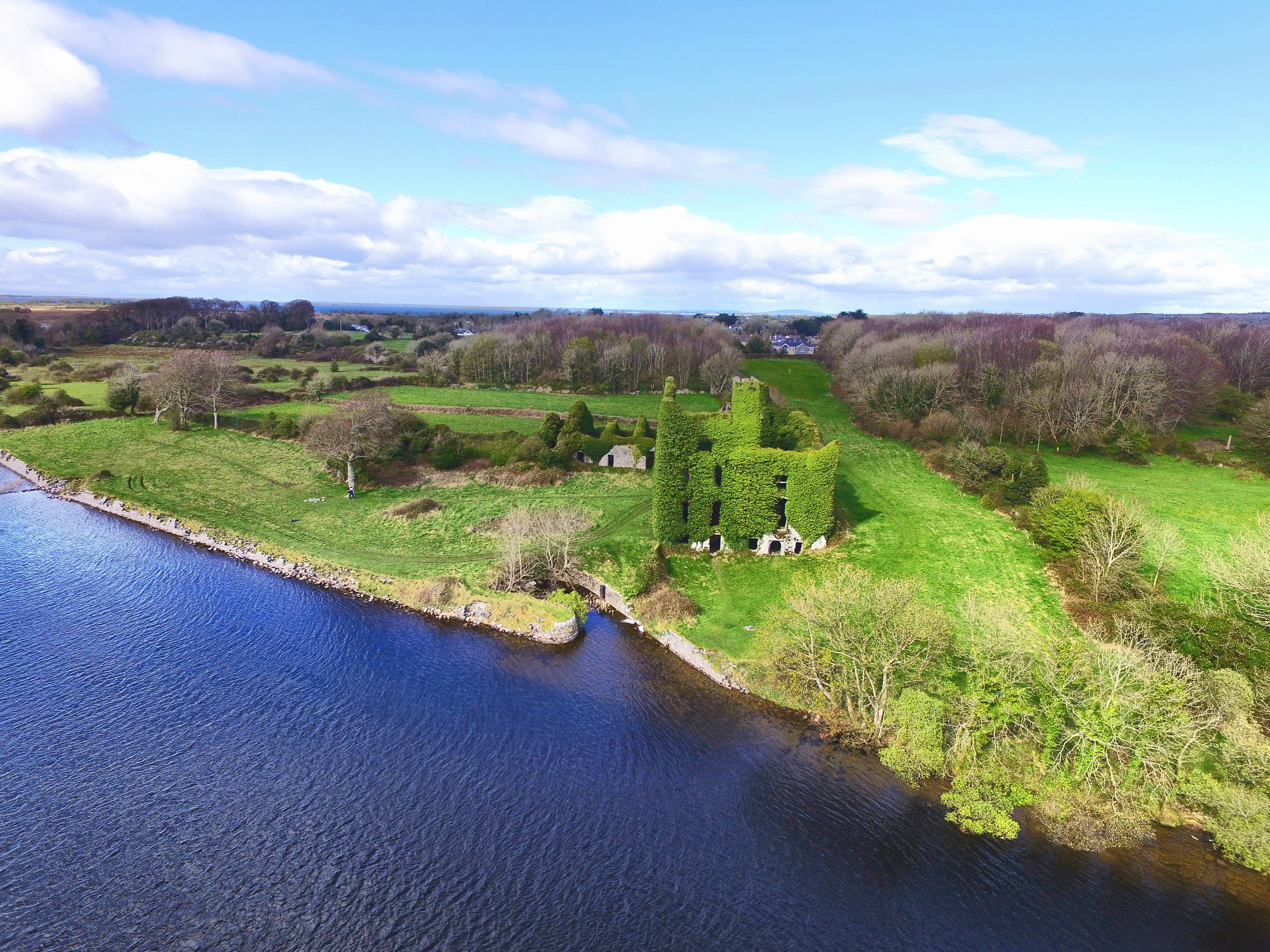
- Menlo Castle (or Menlough Castle) on the banks of the River Corrib

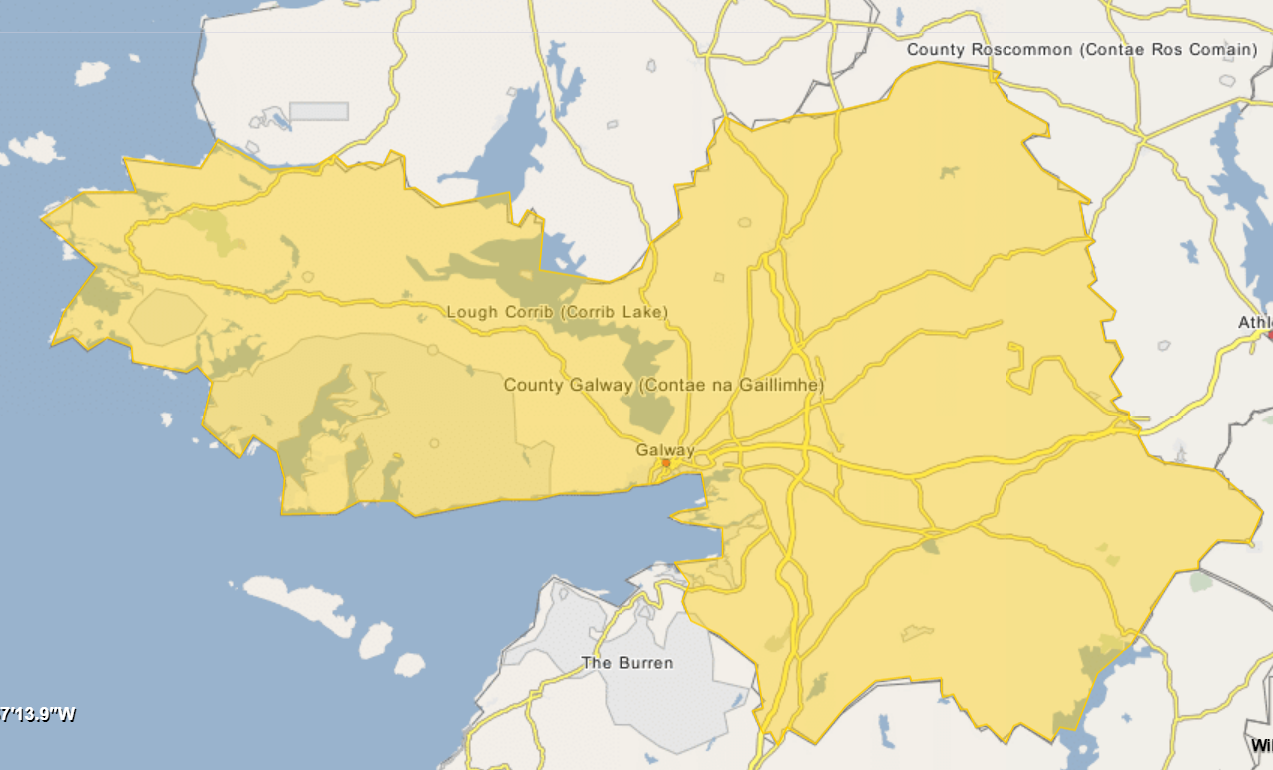
- Location in County Galway
- Coordinates: 53°18′07″N 9°04′24″W
- Country: Ireland
- Province: Connacht
- County: Galway

Mionlach, commonly known by the anglicised name Menlo or Menlough, is a village and townland in one of the Gaeltacht areas of County Galway, Ireland. It is located about 3 km north of the Galway city centre, near where Lough Corrib outflows into the River Corrib. Menlo falls within the boundaries of the city of Galway, though it is outside the urbanised parts of the city and retains the feel of a small village.

== Name ==
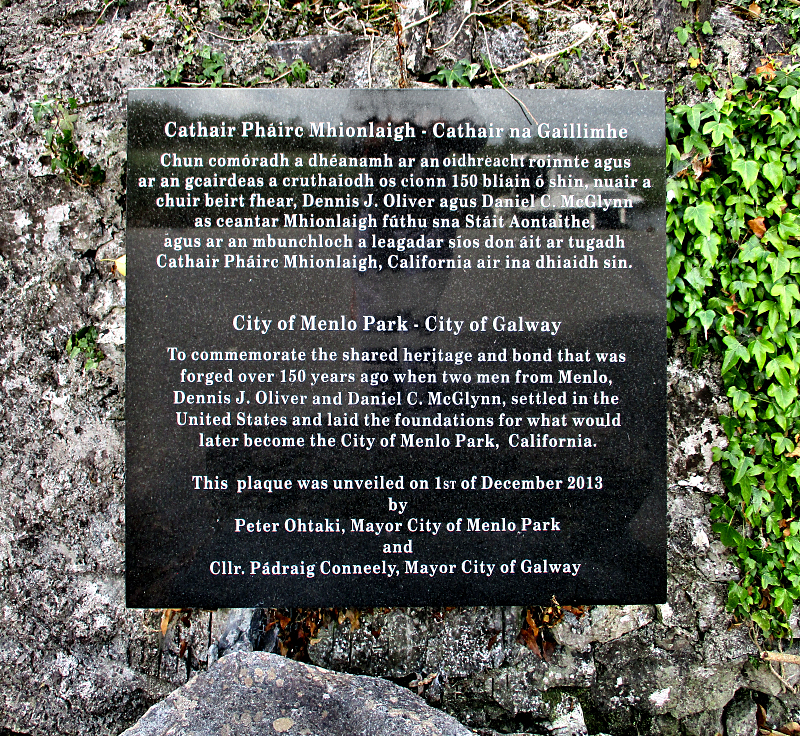
Plaque on Menlo pier noting the connection with Menlo Park, California

Mionlach/Menlough is both a village and townland name and is in the parish of Oranmore. The original Irish name is Mionloch, meaning "small lake", although this becomes Mionlach in the modern spelling. It is sometimes anglicised as "Menlough" - not to be confused with Menlough, also a village in County Galway. English writer Thomas Campbell Foster spelt it "Menlow" in the mid-19th century. As it is within the bounds of the Gaeltacht, since 2005 the Irish-language name is the only one with official status.

Menlo gave its name to the town of Menlo Park in California, which was named by Denis J. Oliver and D.C. McGlynn after their native village.

== History ==
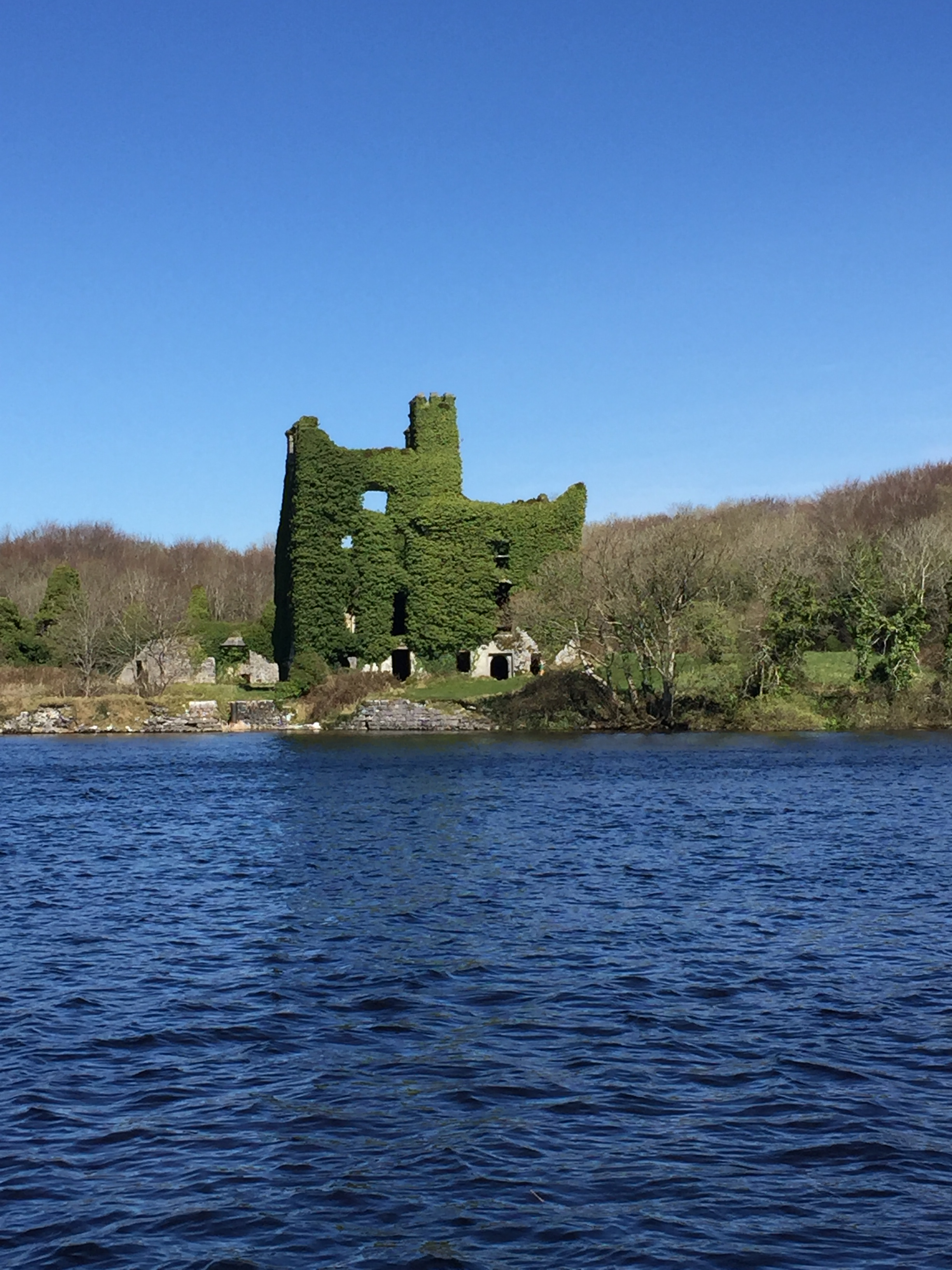
Menlo Castle

Menlo is situated on the east side of the River Corrib and south of Lough Corrib. The remains of Menlo Castle (sometimes given as Menlough Castle) overlook the river. This castle was the former home of Sir Valentine Blake, 1st Baronet. It was owned by the Blake family until it was destroyed by an accidental fire in 1910.

The village retains some of the characteristics of the clachan form which is more evident in Ordnance Survey of Ireland maps of the 19th century. In his Letters on the Condition of the People of Ireland, Thomas Campbell Foster writes of a visit to Menlo in mid-October 1845 (shortly before the Great Famine) and describes it as an example of an Irish rundale village: "It contains about two thousand inhabitants, and their chief subsistence is derived from supplying Galway [City] with milk. The inhabitants keep great numbers of cows, which they feed principally on grains bought in Galway". Foster continues: "The way through the village is the most crooked, as well as the most narrow and dirty lane that can be conceived. There is no row of houses, or anything approaching to a row, but each cottage is stuck independently by itself, and always at an acute, obtuse, or right angle to the next cottage" (293). He continues: "As this is the largest village I ever say, so it is the poorest, the worst built, the most strangely irregular, and the most completely without head or centre, or market or church, or school, of any village I ever was in. It is an overgrown democracy. No man is better or richer than his neighbour in it. It is, in fact, an Irish rundale village".

The first primary level school opened in the village in 1862. The seanchaí and folklorist Tomás Laighléis details the events surrounding this in his book Seanchas Thomáis Laighléis. In the late 1930s a new building for the national school was built housing two classrooms. In the late 1970s two more classrooms were added to the existing school building of Scoil Bhríde. In 2001 the community got permission to build a sporting complex adjoining the school called Áras Pobail, Mionloch. A new modern two storey school building was built on the site of the older school and opened for the start of the school year in September 2014.

== Sport ==
Menlo is home to the Emmetts Rowing Club which won the Blue Riband of Irish Senior Eights Rowing in 1929 and again in 1931. Although the rowing club was disbanded some years later, a hurling club bearing the same Menlo Emmetts name was formed in 1981. Menlo Emmetts GAA club won the Galway County Junior B title in 1983 and in 2006, going on to win the 2006–07 All-Ireland Junior B Club Hurling Championship.

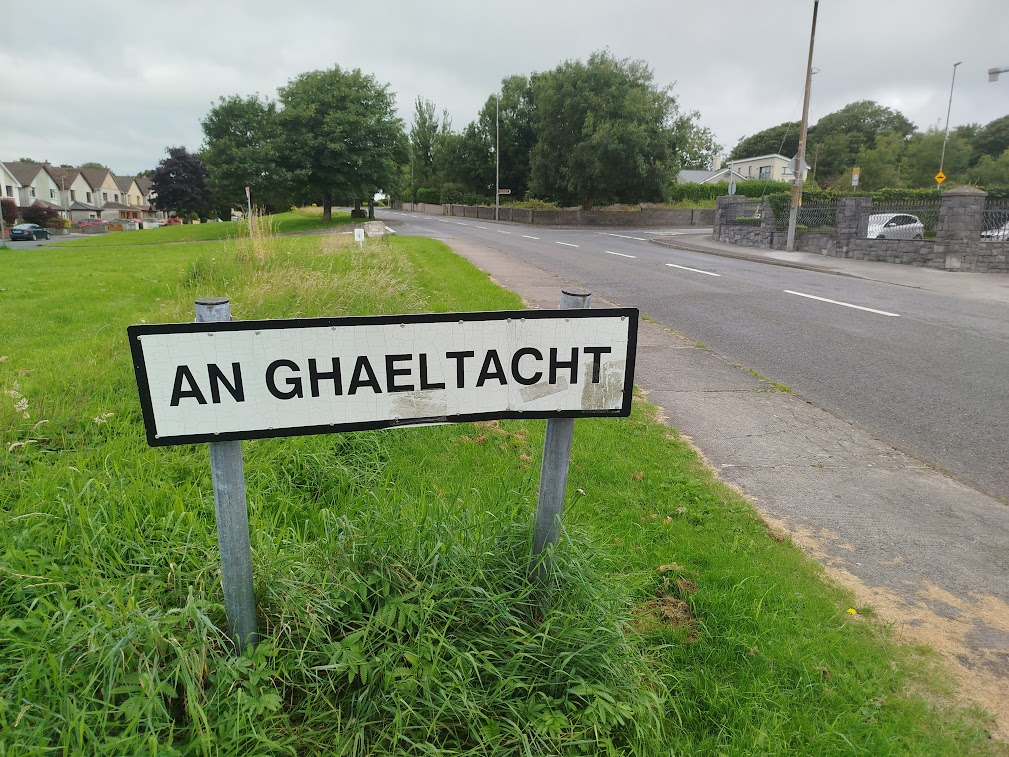
Gaeltacht sign

== Notable people ==
- Valentine Blake (1560–1635), merchant, Mayor of Galway, and 1st Baronet Blake of Menlough, lived at Menlo Castle (as did subsequent Blake baronets)
- Tomás Laighléis (1895–1984), folklorist and seanchaí
- Walter Macken (1915–1967), novelist and playwright, moved to Menlo in the 1960s.

== See also ==
- List of towns and villages in Ireland
