= Sir Francis Blake, 1st Baronet, of Twizell Castle =

English landowner (1709-1780)

Sir Francis Blake, 1st Baronet, FRS (27 April 1709 – 29 March 1780) was a Northumbrian landowner who was created 1st Baronet of Twizell in the Baronetage of Great Britain on 25 May 1774.

== Life ==
He was the grandson of Sir Francis Blake, Knt., of Cogges, Oxfordshire, who acquired Ford Castle, Northumberland on his marriage to Elizabeth, née Carr, and who purchased Twizell Castle, Northumberland, in about 1685; and was the son of Sarah, daughter of Sir Francis of Cogges and her cousin Robert Blake of Menlough (1697–1734).

He was educated at Lincoln College, Oxford.

He inherited the Twizell Castle estate (subject to his father's life interest) on the death of his grandfather in 1717. (Ford Castle passed to his cousin Francis Blake Delaval (1692–1752)). He supported the government during the Jacobite rising of 1745. Described as an 'experimental philosopher', he was elected a Fellow of the Royal Society in 1746.

After his father's death in 1734, he moved out of Twizell Castle and settled at Tillmouth House nearby. He and his son embarked on a costly and ambitious project to build a new castle on the Twizell site. The design, five-storey Gothick, was by architect James Nesbit of Kelso. After some forty years the project, still unfinished, was abandoned.

He served as High Sheriff of Northumberland in 1772. Blake acquired other estates including Fowberry Tower in 1776 and Seghill in 1777. On 29 March 1780, he died at Tilmouth, and is buried at Houghton-le-Spring.

== Family ==
He married Isabella, née Ayton, in 1732. His first son Robert died aged 21 in 1754. In his will, Blake left £60 for the creation of a monument to his son in the West Cloister of Westminster Abbey. He was succeeded by his second son Francis.

Baronetage of Great Britain
New creation	Baronet (of Twizell Castle); 1774–1780	Succeeded by Francis Blake
