= Northumberland Militia Artillery =

Auxiliary unit of the British Army

Northumberland Militia Artillery 3rd Brigade, Northern Division, RA Northumberland Artillery (Western Division) RA Northumberland Royal Garrison Artillery (M)
- Active: July 1854–March 1909
- Country: United Kingdom
- Branch: Militia
- Role: Garrison Artillery
- Part of: Northern Division, RA (1882–89); Western Division, RA (1889–1902)
- Garrison/HQ: Tynemouth (1854); Newcastle upon Tyne (1854–61); Berwick-upon-Tweed (1861–1909)

Commanders
- Notable commanders: Lt-Col Sir Charles Reed, KCB; Lt-Col Sir Francis Blake, 1st Baronet, of Tillmouth Park

The Northumberland Militia Artillery was a part-time reserve unit of Britain's Royal Artillery based in the County of Northumberland, from 1854 to 1909.

== Background ==
The long-standing national Militia of the United Kingdom was revived by the Militia Act 1852, enacted during a period of international tension. As before, units were raised and administered on a county basis, and filled by voluntary enlistment (although conscription by means of the Militia Ballot might be used if the counties failed to meet their quotas). Training was for 56 days on enlistment, then for 21–28 days per year, during which the men received full army pay. Under the Act, Militia units could be embodied by Royal Proclamation for full-time home defence service in three circumstances:

1. 'Whenever a state of war exists between Her Majesty and any foreign power'.
2. 'In all cases of invasion or upon imminent danger thereof'.
3. 'In all cases of rebellion or insurrection'.

The 1852 Act introduced Militia Artillery units in addition to the traditional infantry regiments. Their role was to man coastal defences and fortifications, relieving the Royal Artillery (RA) for active service.

== History ==
The unit was formed at Berwick-upon-Tweed in July 1854 under the title of Northumberland Militia Artillery. It was one of the smallest artillery militia corps to be raised at that time, with an establishment of only 161 all ranks, including permanent staff, organised in two batteries. Initially, its headquarters was at Tynemouth, but it moved to Newcastle upon Tyne in December 1854.

In May 1860, while the Northumberland Artillery was embodied for service during the Indian Mutiny, there was a riot at Tynemouth Castle and North Shields, in which the militiamen were accused of maltreating the police in the discharge of their duties. The disgusted townsfolk urgently requested the Northumberland Artillery to be removed from the area or disbanded completely. The unit was moved to Ireland, and in September 1861 its headquarters was shifted to Berwick-upon-Tweed, where it remained for the rest of its existence.

The first commandant was Captain Charles Clementson, who was promoted to lieutenant-colonel when the establishment was increased to four batteries in the 1860s. He was succeeded from 6 August 1868 by Lt-Col Charles Reed. By 1868 the establishment had risen to 392 in four batteries, which was increased to five batteries in 1874 and to six in 1882.

In the Mobilisation Scheme developed in the 1870s, the Northumberland Artillery Militia's war station was in the Tilbury Division of the Thames and Medway Defences.

The Artillery Militia was reorganised into 11 divisions of garrison artillery on 1 April 1882, and the Northumberland corps joined the Northern Division, becoming the 3rd Brigade, Northern Division, RA. When the Northern Division was abolished on 1 July 1889 its militia were transferred to the Western Division and the unit's title was altered to Northumberland Artillery (Western Division) RA.

The Honorary Colonel Commanding the unit from 1888‍–‍1901 was Lt. Col. Henry [Harry] Best Hans Hamilton (14 October 1850 – 5 August 1935), the second son of Rev. George Hans Hamilton. Harry had retired when the First World War started. Aged 64, he signed up for active military service and was the oldest British soldier mobilised to France. His ruse was discovered, and he was repatriated, where he was posted to the staff, as Colonel.

From 1899 the Militia artillery formally became part of the Royal Garrison Artillery (RGA), and when the RGA abolished the divisional structure, the Berwick unit took the title of Northumberland RGA (M) on 1 January 1902.

== Embodiments ==
The unit was twice embodied for home defence:

- Indian Mutiny: 4 April 1859 to 2 March 1861. The corps was embodied at North Shields, moving to Hexham, and Tynemouth before going south to Sheerness in the summer of 1859. It was back in Tynemouth by the autumn and remained there until May 1860 when it was involved in a riot (see above). Thereafter it was sent to Ireland, first at Cork, then at Kinsale, where it stayed until the end of its embodiment.
- Second Boer War: 7 May to 11 October 1900.

== Disbandment ==
After the Boer War, the future of the Militia was called into question. There were moves to reform the Auxiliary Forces (Militia, Yeomanry and Volunteers) to take their place in the six Army Corps proposed by St John Brodrick as Secretary of State for War. Some batteries of Militia Artillery were to be converted to field artillery. However, little of Brodrick's scheme was carried out.

Under the sweeping Haldane Reforms of 1908, the Militia was replaced by the Special Reserve, a semi-professional force whose role was to provide reinforcement drafts for Regular units serving overseas in wartime. Although the majority of the officers and men of the Northumberland RGA (M) accepted transfer to the Special Reserve Royal Field Artillery, and the unit was to become the Northumberland Royal Field Reserve Artillery, all these units were disbanded in March 1909. Instead the men of the RFA Special Reserve would form Brigade Ammunition Columns for the Regular RFA brigades on the outbreak of war.

The last commanding officer was Lt-Col Sir Francis Blake, 1st Baronet, of Tillmouth Park.

== Insignia ==
In 1854 the officers of the Northumberland Militia Artillery wore badges that were unique to the unit. Their black leather helmet carried a plate consisting of an ornate silver shield surmounted by a crown and surrounded by a laurel wreath. The shield bore the star of the Order of the Garter with the garter strap in gilt and blue enamel and the cross of St George enamelled red. Below the star were crossed gilt cannons. Beneath the shield was a scroll inscribed 'NORTHUMBERLAND'. The officers' regimental pattern button was silvered with a scalloped edge, bearing the three cannons in pale from the arms of the Board of Ordnance surmounted by a crown, with a scroll underneath inscribed 'NORTHUMBERLAND ARTILLERY'.

== Honorary colonel ==
The following officer served as honorary colonel of the unit:

- Lt-Col Sir Charles Reed, KCB (1820–1908), former commandant, appointed 10 November 1888.

== See also ==
- Militia and Volunteers of Northumberland
- Militia Artillery units of the United Kingdom and Colonies
