= Bowring Park, Knowsley =

Park in England

Coordinates: 53.4062°N 2.8619°W

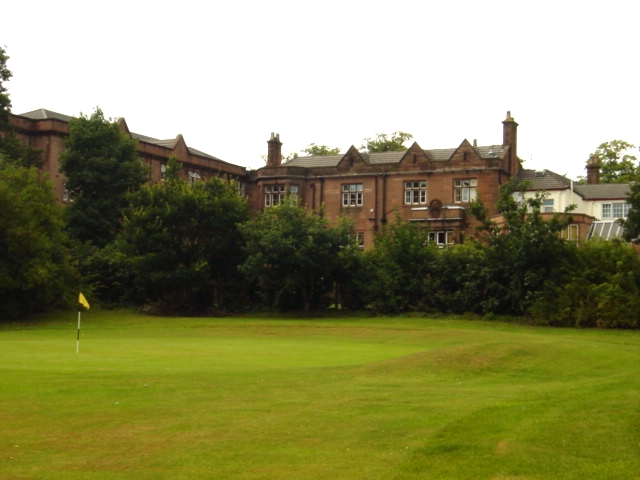
Bowring Park golf course, Bowring Park

Bowring Park is a public park in the Metropolitan Borough of Knowsley, near Liverpool, England. It is the oldest public park in Knowsley and includes the first municipal golf course in England (established 1913). It was opened in 1907 and was a gift of Liverpool's first Lord Mayor William Benjamin Bowring (later first baronet) in 1906 of the Roby Hall Estate. He was the senior partner in a shipping firm. His wife Isabel Maclean Bowring (née Jarvis) of Saint John, New Brunswick, was sympathetic to the suffering and needy among the poor of Liverpool. Originally 100 acres (0.40 km^{2}) in size, it lost some to the M62 motorway.

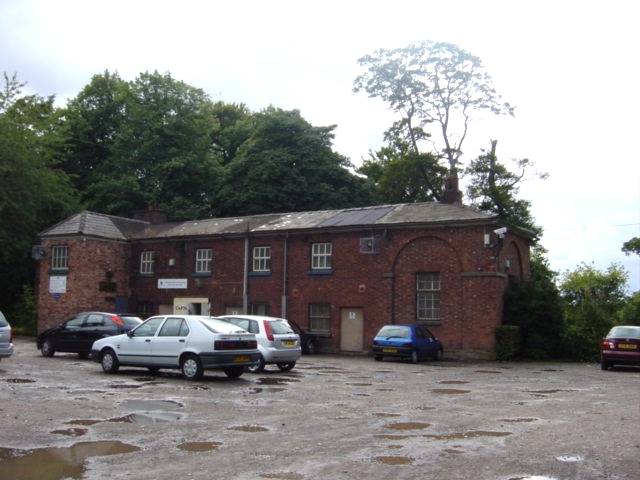
Bowring Park golf clubhouse

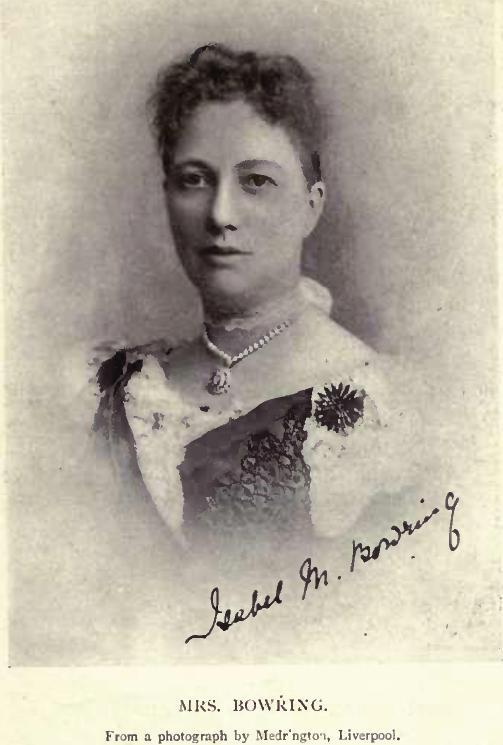
Lord Mayor William Benjamin Bowring`s wife Isabel M Bowring
