= Sir Valentine Blake, 3rd Baronet =

17th-century Irish merchant and politician

Sir Valentine Blake, 3rd Baronet (died 1652) was an Irish merchant and politician.

== Biography ==
Blake was the eldest of three sons of Sir Thomas Blake and Juliane, daughter of Geoffrey Browne. He was admitted to the Middle Temple on 19 July 1628, was knighted on 3 October 1629, and sat in the Parliament of Ireland of 1634–35 as MP either for Tuam or Galway county. He was a member of Galway's town council by 1638 and is listed as an alderman in 1641. He succeeded his father the following year.

Elected MP for Galway Town in 1639, Blake was expelled from the Irish House of Commons in June 1642 for association with the Irish Rebellion of 1641. This was a result of his activities in Galway early in the year, which included aiding the amassing of a military force to oppose the British garrison at Forthill, overlooking the town. He served as Mayor from 1643–44 and was a highly active member of the Irish Confederation. He supported the Ormonde peace treaties of 1646 and 1649. He and Sir Richard Blake of Ardfry were captured by the soldiers of Owen Roe O'Neill in June 1648 but were released unharmed.

He was one of the Galwegians who supported negotiations to secure aid from Charles IV, Duke of Lorraine, in 1651. This was to no avail and he was one of the six townsmen who signed the articles of surrender of the town on 5 April 1652. His will was proved in April 1654, and he was buried in the Loretto chapel of St. Francis's abbey, Galway.

With his wife, Eleanor, third daughter of Sir Henry Lynch, he had four sons and three daughters. Much of the family property was confiscated by the Cromwellian government but substantially restored to the following generation. The family remained of note as local landowners and politicians into the 20th century. The current holder of the title is Sir Anthony Teilo Bruce Blake, 18th Baronet, born in 1951.

Civic offices
Preceded by Richard Óge Martyn	Mayor of Galway; 1643–1644	Succeeded by James Darcy fitz Nicholas
Regnal titles
Preceded by Thomas Blake	Blake baronets of Menlo; 1642–1652?	Succeeded by Thomas Blake
