= Chatton =

Village in Northumberland, England

Coordinates: 55.547°N 1.914°W

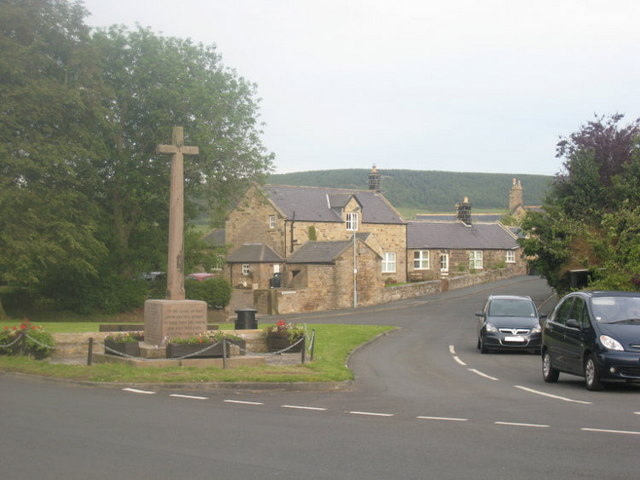

- Location within Northumberland
- Population: 338 (2011 census)
- OS grid reference: NU054281
- Unitary authority: Northumberland
- Ceremonial county: Northumberland
- Region: North East
- Country: England
- Sovereign state: United Kingdom
- Post town: ALNWICK
- Postcode district: NE66
- Dialling code: 01668
- Police: Northumbria
- Fire: Northumberland
- Ambulance: North East
- UK Parliament: North Northumberland

Chatton is a village in Northumberland, in England. It is roughly six kilometres (3 1/2 miles) east of Wooler.

== History ==
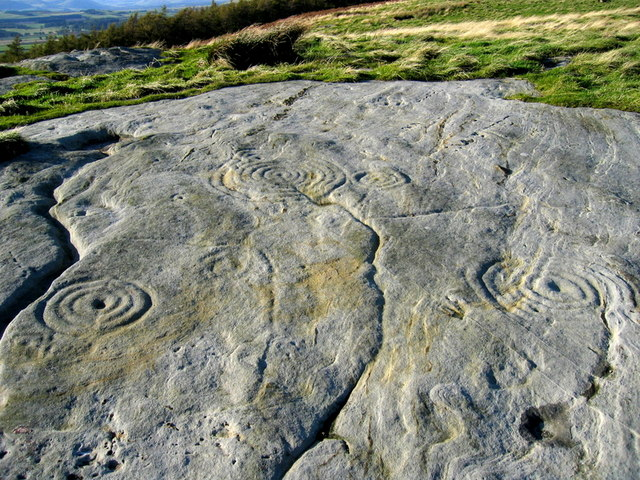
Petroglyphs on Chatton Park Hill

Chatton has been occupied for many centuries. There has been a church on the site since the twelfth century. There is evidence of occupation in prehistoric times: a rock overhang at nearby Ketley Crag has examples of pre-historic rock art petroglyphs, including a profusion of cup and ring marks, which have been described as "stunning".

Writing in 2003, local historian Joy Palmer-Cooper described Chatton as an "'estate' village", mainly from the nineteenth century. Palmer-Cooper identified five Grade II listed buildings in Chatton: "Chatton Park House ..., Chatton Bridge, the former Chatton United Reformed Church, the Blacksmith's Shop, and Broomhouse Farmhouse." In 2013, Grade II listed building status was also awarded to the Parish Church.

Nearby, though not within the main village itself, there are former tower houses such as Fowberry Tower and Hetton Hall, Grade II* listed fifteenth century tower houses later incorporated in country houses. (Both these houses are privately owned, and not open to the general public.)

== Economy ==
The village has amenities which include a pub (the Percy Arms) and village shop.

== Religious sites ==
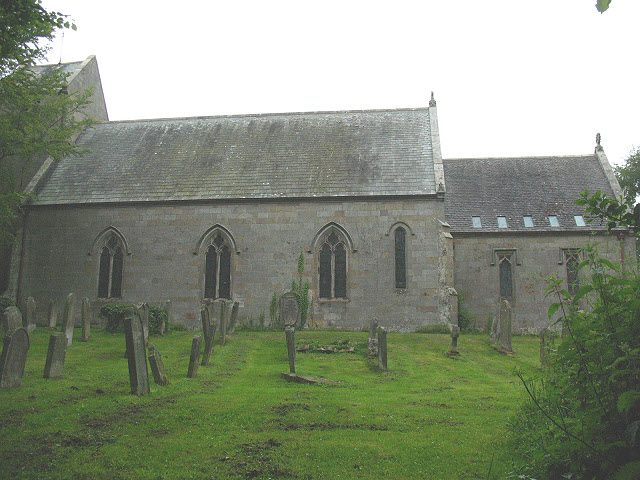
Holy Cross church

The present-day Holy Cross Church on Church Hill Road is a Grade II listed building. It replaced an earlier thirteenth century building, and was constructed between 1763 and 1770 with later extensions. The church - which belongs to the Church of England - holds regular services and is part of the southern benefice of Glendale.

From 1850 to 1980, the Presbyterian Church of Chatton (from 1972, a United Reformed Church) stood on New Road. In 1979, serious structural damage was found and the building closed, with the congregation conducting services in Holy Cross Church's building. The old Presbyterian Church building passed into private ownership; since 1995, it has housed the Chatton Gallery.

== See also ==
- Chatton transmitting station
