= Sir Francis Blake, 1st Baronet, of Tillmouth Park =

British politician & barrister (1856-1940)

Sir Francis Douglas Blake 1st Baronet, of Tillmouth Park CB, DL

Member of Parliament for Berwick-upon-Tweed
- In office 1916–1922
- Preceded by: Edward Grey
- Succeeded by: Hilton Philipson

Personal details
- Born: 27 February 1856
- Died: 5 February 1940 (aged 83)
- Party: Liberal
- Spouse: Selina Colquhoun (m. 1886)
- Parent: Francis Blake (father)
- Relatives: Francis Blake (son)
- Education: University College, Oxford

Sir Francis Douglas Blake, 1st Baronet, CB, DL (27 February 1856 – 5 February 1940) was Deputy Lieutenant of Northumberland, Vice Lord Lieutenant in 1920 and 1931, a Justice of the Peace, and a Member of Parliament.

== Early life ==
The son of Francis Blake (1832–1861) and grandson of Sir Francis Blake of Twizell Castle, on the death of his father Francis Douglas Blake inherited substantial estates in Northumberland, including Tillmouth House, Twizell Castle, and Seghill.

Blake was educated at University College, Oxford, and was admitted to the Inner Temple as a Barrister-at-Law. He was created a Baronet, of Tillmouth Park, in the Baronetage of the United Kingdom on 22 July 1907.

== Career ==
He became chairman of the Northumberland Quarter Sessions.

Later he was elected Liberal Member of Parliament for Berwick on Tweed 1916–1922, and was appointed Companion of the Order of the Bath in 1919.

He was appointed Lieutenant-Colonel commanding of the Northumberland Royal Garrison Artillery (Militia) on 30 November 1901. That unit was disbanded in 1909. On 13 May 1925 he was appointed Honorary Colonel of the Tynemouth Heavy Brigade, Royal Artillery

He was sometime chairman of the Northumberland County Council.

Blake demolished the family house at Tillmouth and replaced it with a grand mansion in 1882 using in the process large quantities of masonry from the unfinished and abandoned project that was Twizell Castle.

On 14 December 1886, he married Selina Colquhoun (daughter of James Cleland Burns of Glenlee, Hamilton, South Lanarkshire), and was succeeded in the Baronetcy by their son Francis.

Parliament of the United Kingdom
Preceded by Edward Grey	Member of Parliament for Berwick-upon-Tweed; 1916 – 1922	Succeeded by Hilton Philipson
Baronetage of the United Kingdom
New creation	Baronet (of Tillmouth Park); 1907–1940	Succeeded by Edward Colquhoun Blake
