= Sir Thomas Blake, 2nd Baronet =

Irish politician

Sir Thomas Blake, 2nd Baronet, died 1642.

== Biography ==
Blake was the eldest son of Sir Valentine Blake, 1st Baronet and his first wife, Margaret, daughter of Robuck French.

Blake was Sheriff with his father, though the latter was removed from office for refusing the oath of supremacy in 1611. He was Mayor of Galway for the term 1637–38. He was an alderman, and MP for the town in 1634–35.

Blake was killed in the town when a cannon, built by its citizens, exploded, killing him and a number of others.

He married Juliane Browne, daughter of Geoffrey, and was succeeded by his son, Valentine, in 1642. He had three other sons and several daughters.

== See also ==
- Blake baronets

Civic offices
Preceded by Anthony Lynch fitz James	Mayor of Galway; 1637–1638	Succeeded by Sir Robuck Lynch
Baronetage of Ireland
Preceded by Valentine Blake	Baronet (of Menlo); 1635–1642	Succeeded by Valentine Blake
