= Barlow baronets of Bradwall Hall (1907) =

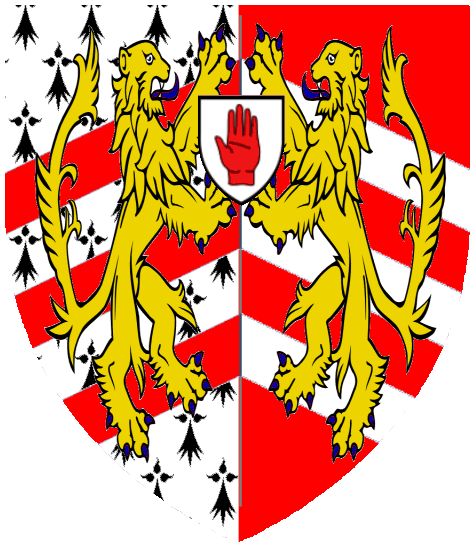
Escutcheon of the baronets of Bradwall Hall

The Barlow Baronetcy, of Bradwall Hall in Sandbach in the County of Chester, was created in the Baronetage of the United Kingdom on 20 July 1907 for John Barlow. He was a successful businessman and also represented Frome in the House of Commons as a Liberal. He was succeeded by his eldest son, the second Baronet. He sat as Member of Parliament for Eddisbury and Middleton and Prestwich. As of 2023 the title is held by his grandson, the fourth Baronet, who succeeded in that year. The third baronet was High Sheriff of Cheshire in 1979.

== Barlow baronets, of Bradwall Hall (1907) ==
- Sir John Emmott Barlow, 1st Baronet (1857–1932)
- Sir John Denman Barlow, 2nd Baronet (1898–1986)
- Sir John Kemp Barlow, 3rd Baronet (1934–2022)
- Sir John William Marshall Barlow, 4th Baronet (born 1964)

The heir apparent is John William Oakley Barlow (born 1993), eldest son of the present holder.

== Notes ==
Baronetage of the United Kingdom
Preceded by Herbert baronets	Barlow baronets of Bradwall Hall; 20 July 1907	Succeeded by Blake baronets
