= Menlo Castle =

16th-century castle in County Galway, Ireland

- Caisleán Mhionlaigh (Irish)
- Menlough Castle
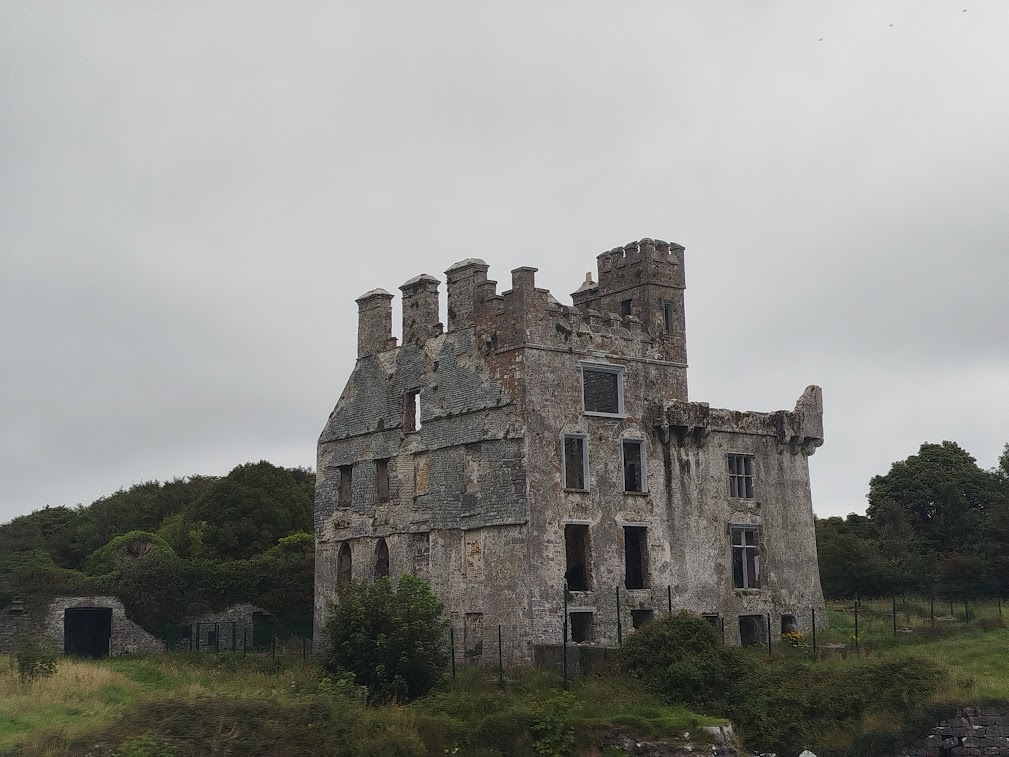
- The castle viewed from the River Corrib

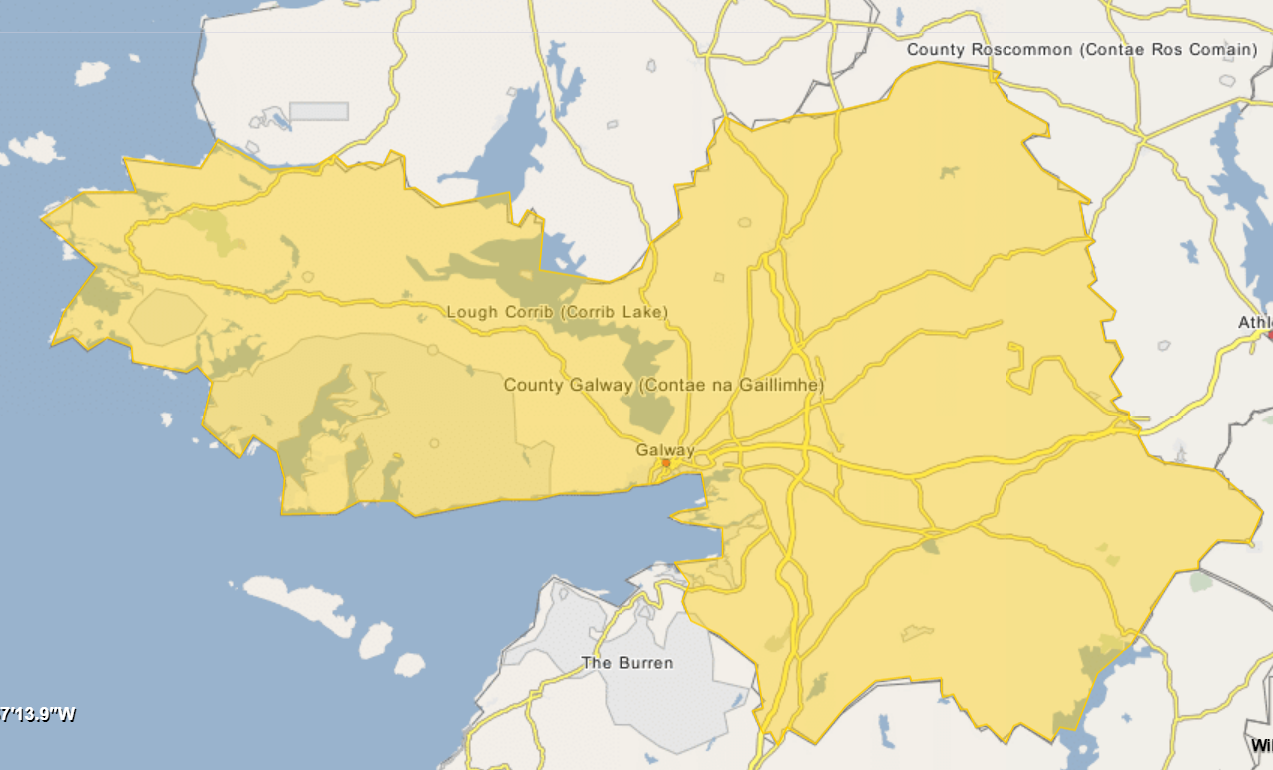
- Location within County Galway
- 53°17′47″N 9°04′25″W
- Type: Fortified house
- Location: Menlough, Galway, Ireland

History
- Built: c. 1569

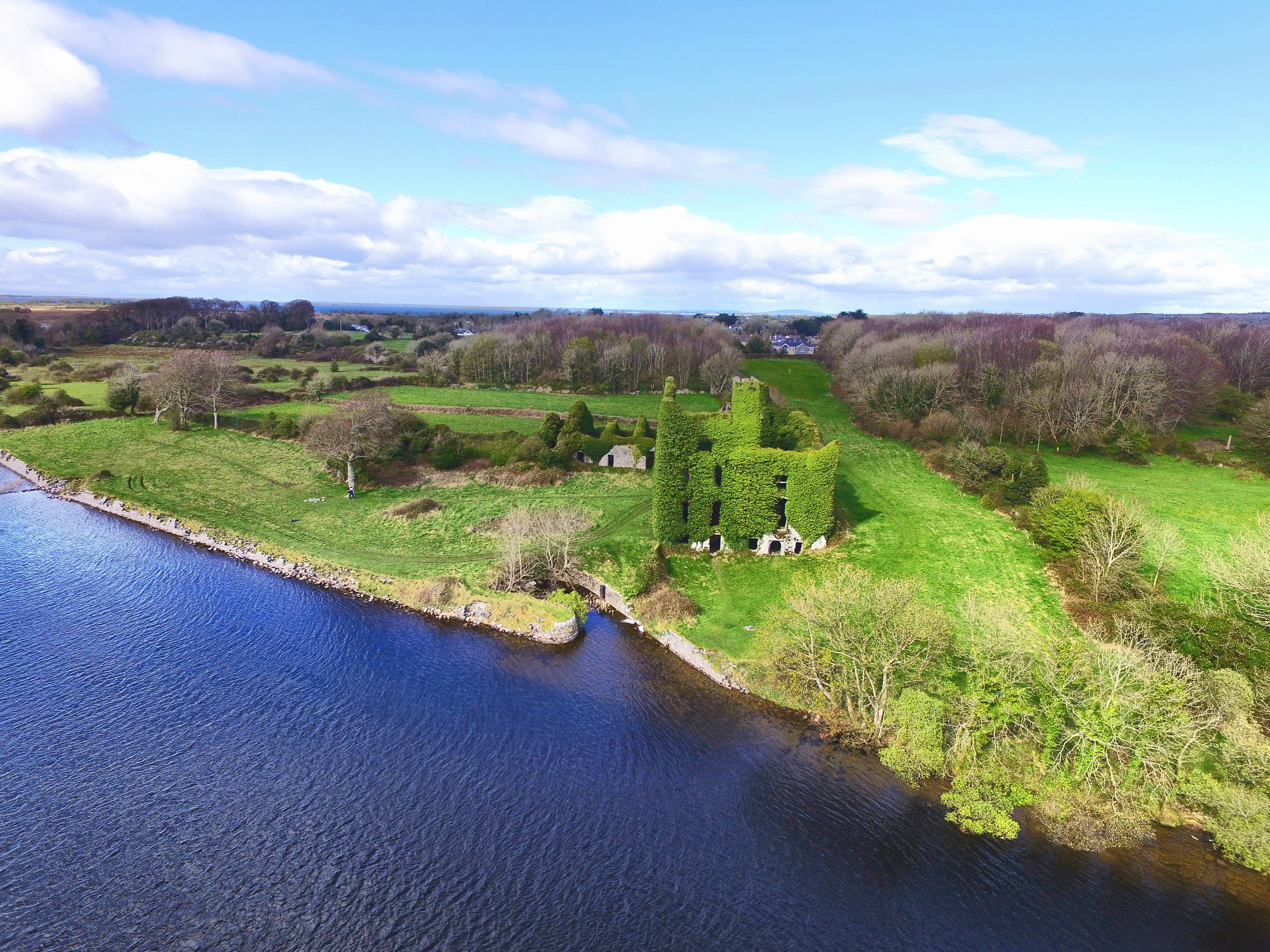
The ruined castle ruin is on the bank of the River Corrib

Menlo Castle or Menlough Castle (Irish: Caisleán Mhionlaigh), also called Blake's Castle, is a 16th-century castle situated on the bank of the River Corrib near Menlo village in County Galway, Ireland.

== History ==
Menlo Castle is built on the site of, and incorporates portions of, a mid-16th century tower house. Several sources date the original tower house to 1569, and it was recorded as being occupied by a Thomas Colman in 1574. Later occupied by the Blake family, the castle was extended to include a two-bay four-storey block during the 18th century. There is a square turreted structure on the building's eastern end.

The castle was home to the Blake family for several centuries until it was destroyed by fire in the early 20th century. On 26 July 1910, while Sir Valentine Blake (14th baronet) and Lady Blake were away in Dublin, a fire broke out in the castle. The body of their disabled daughter, Eleanor, was never found and she is presumed to have died in the fire.

The castle was largely left to ruin following the fire, and the Blake estate was divided by the Land Commission in 1923. The castle site and its surrounds were acquired by Galway City Council under a compulsory purchase order (from five separate land owners) in July 2000.

In 2015, the then Mayor of Galway, Frank Fahey, proposed the restoration of the castle and grounds. In 2024, Galway City Council was awarded €85,000 in funding for the restoration of Menlo Castle as part of a broader restoration effort in Galway spearheaded by the Community Monuments Fund. Funding for this project had risen to €130,000 by June 2026.
