= 1916 Berwick-upon-Tweed by-election =

UK Parliamentary by-election

The 1916 Berwick-upon-Tweed by-election was held on 16 August 1916. The by-election was held due to the elevation to the peerage of the incumbent Liberal MP, Sir Edward Grey.

It was won by the Liberal candidate Sir Francis Blake. Blake was unopposed by Conservative or Labour candidates due to a war time electoral truce where the three main parties would not put up candidates against one another. This meant that Blake was sometimes referred to as a "Coalitionist". The unsuccessful candidate, Dr Arthur Turnbull, stood as an Independent, though one source has described him as an Independent Liberal.

1916 Berwick-upon-Tweed by-election Electorate 9,454
Party	Candidate	Votes	%	±%
Liberal	Francis Blake	3,794	85.9	+24.7
Independent	Arthur Turnbull	621	14.1	New
Majority		3,173	71.8	+49.4
Turnout		4,415	46.7	−33.1
Liberal hold		Swing	N/A	
