= Sir William Bowring, 1st Baronet =

Sir William Bowring
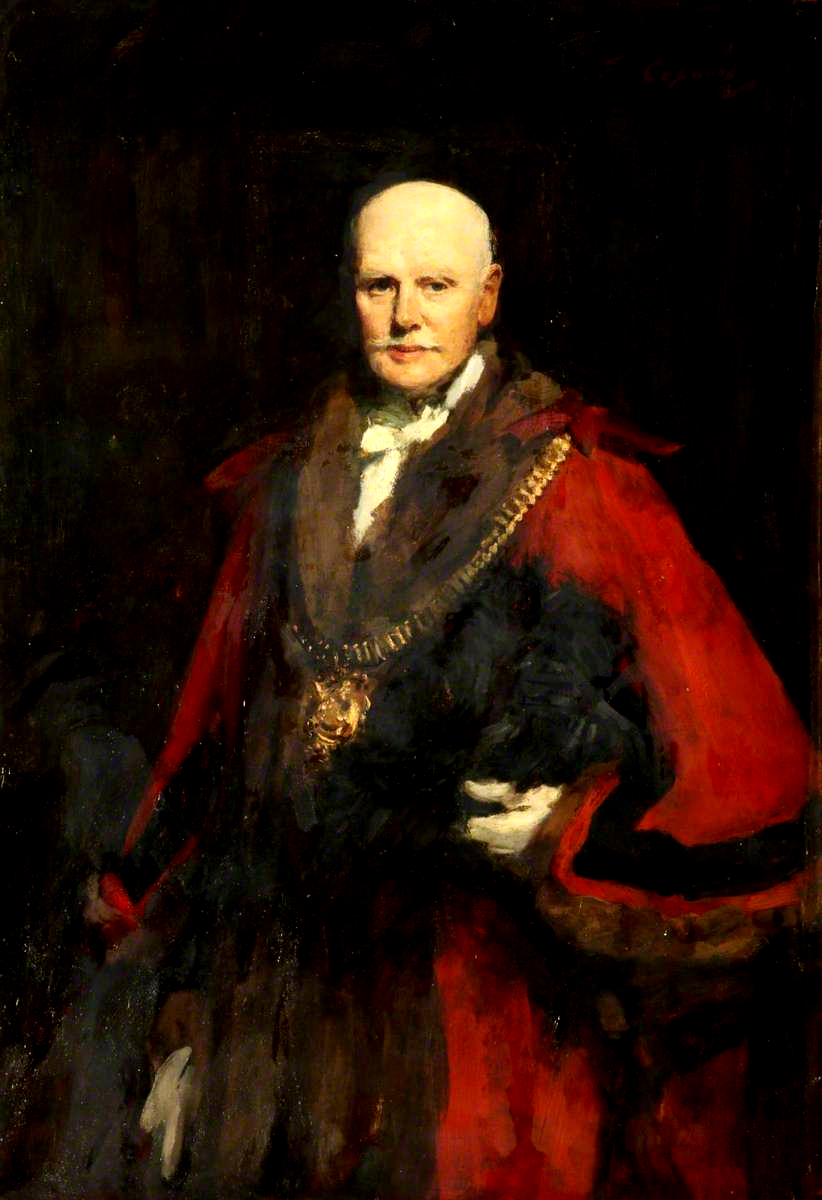
- Sir William Bowring, 1st Baronet, 1909 portrait

Lord Mayor of Liverpool
- In office 1893–1894
- Preceded by: Robert Durning Holt
- Succeeded by: William Henry Watts

Personal details
- Born: 13 February 1837 St. John's, Newfoundland
- Died: 28 October 1916 (aged 79)

Escutcheon of the Bowring baronets of Beechwood

Sir William Benjamin Bowring, 1st Baronet (13 February 1837 – 20 October 1916), was a British shipowner, local politician and benefactor.

Bowring was a senior partner of C. T. Bowring & Company, shipowners, and served as Lord Mayor of Liverpool between 1893 and 1894. He gave Bowring Park, Knowsley, to the city of Liverpool in 1906 and was created a baronet, of Beechwood in the Parish of Grassendale in the County Palatine of Lancaster, on 23 July 1907. He died in October 1916, aged 79, when the title became extinct.

He was the son of Charles Tricks Bowring and grandson of Benjamin Bowring and brother of Charles R. Bowring of Newfoundland.

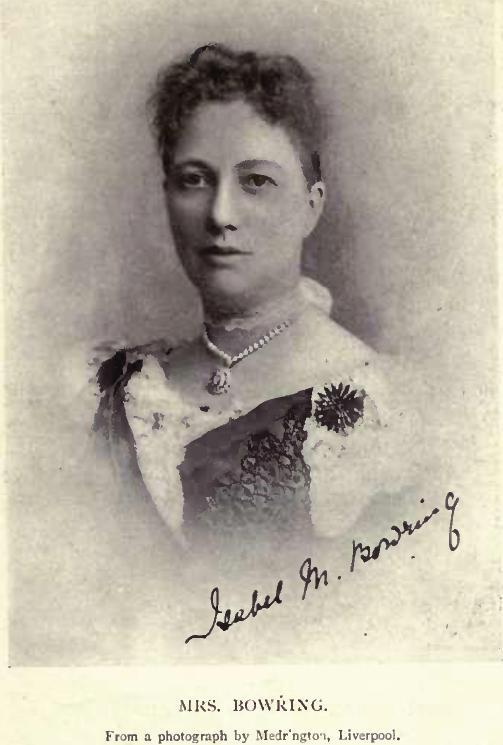
Bowring's wife, Isabel Maclean Jarvis

Political offices
Preceded by Robert Durning Holt	Lord Mayor of Liverpool; 1893–1894	Succeeded by William Henry Watts
Baronetage of the United Kingdom
New creation	Baronet (of Beechwood); 1907–1916	Extinct
Preceded by Blake baronets	Bowring baronets of Beechwood; 23 July 1907	Succeeded by Edwards baronets
