= Walter Blake (politician) =

Minor Irish aristocrat and politician from County Galway

Sir Walter Blake, (bef. 1672–May 1748), 6th Bt., was a minor Irish aristocrat and politician from County Galway.

== Biography ==
Blake was the son of Sir Thomas Blake and Maria French. In October 1686, Walter Blake succeeded to the title of 6th Baronet Blake of Menlough. During the Williamite war in Ireland, he was a captain in Colonel Dillon's Regiment of Foot of King James II's Irish Army.

Blake was Member of Parliament for Galway County in the Patriot Parliament of 1689. He was the first Roman Catholic of distinction to join William of Orange's forces, where he raised and maintained a regiment at his own expense.

Blake lived in Menlough, County Galway. In 1687, he married Anne Kirwan, daughter of Sir John Kirwan. In 1706, he married Agnes Blake, daughter of John Blake.

Blake died in May 1748 in Marlborough Street, Dublin. He was succeeded as Baronet Blake by his son, Thomas Blake.

Baronetage of Ireland
Preceded by Valentine Blake	Baronet (of Menlough); 1686–1748	Succeeded by Thomas Blake
