= Marchand Mission =

French colonial enterprise in Africa

The Marchand Mission was an expedition undertaken by French emissary Jean-Baptiste Marchand (1863-1934) and 150 men with designs to expand French colonial power in northeastern Africa.

Starting from Libreville (in present-day Gabon) in 1897, the Marchand expedition spent 14 arduous months crossing largely uncharted regions of north central Africa. They finally reached the fort of Fashoda on the upper Nile on July 10, 1898, and hoisted the French flag. On September 18, a flotilla of British gunboats led by Field Marshal Horatio Kitchener arrived at Fashoda; Kitchener had just defeated Mahdi forces at The Battle of Omdurman, and was in the process of reconquering the Sudan in the name of the Egyptian Khedive. The confrontation of the French and British was cordial but both sides insisted on their right to Fashoda.

News of the encounter was relayed to Paris and London and each side accused the other of expansionism and aggression. A stalemate (the Fashoda Incident) continued until November 3 when French Foreign Minister Théophile Delcassé, fearing the possibility of war, withdrew Marchand and his troops and ceded the Sudan to the British.

The Marchand Mission was a major French attempt during the great period of colonial expansion to link colonial territories across the breadth of Africa. Some 45,000 porters struggled over 2000 miles to achieve the conquest, carrying hundreds of tons of supplies.
