= Sir Valentine Blake, 1st Baronet =

Sir Valentine Blake was an Irish merchant and Mayor of Galway, 1560 – 2 January 1635.

== Biography ==
He lived in Menlo castle and had a wife called lady Blake. The Blakes were the richest family in the area with properties in Mayo, Clare and Galway. The family made many refurbishments to the castle over the years, including the addition of a Jacobean mansion to the old tower house in the late 17th century.

The family were well-liked by the villagers of Menlo, many of whom were their tenants. Each year they invited the villagers to the castle grounds for the 'Maying in Menlo' festival, which was a great Galway tradition at the time. The grounds were used for all kinds of sports and athletics, yachting, tennis, rowing, music and dancing. Boats from Woodquay and Long Walk would bring people up the river and sweet sellers sold red and white sugars sticks and sweet-pipes at a halfpenny each. Calls from vendors rang throughout the air as they lured villagers in with their attractive wares, their colourful tents stretched out from the river banks to the village school house. But that wasn't all that echoed through the air; A local midwife to the Blake family used to tell a story that while on a night journey to the castle, she heard faeries dancing to faery music in a nearby faery ring.

The details of that terrible night, except the efforts made by the local people, the fire service (for such as it was at the time), and soldiers from Renmore barracks, to tackle the blaze, were lost. The only surviving witness, Anne Browne, who was in the house the night it was destroyed, seemed to have disappeared from this world. But in fact she made a remarkable recovery. She lay on a waterbed for five months until she was well enough to leave hospital, and stay with her friends, the Cloonan family, of Bohermore. After some attempts to get work in Galway she emigrated to America where she married, had children and grandchildren. In fact it was as a result of the promptings of her grandchildren in March 1977, that she wrote to the late solicitor Maurice Semple, and told him the story of that fatal night.

Civic offices
Preceded by Richard Bodkin	Mayor of Galway; 29 September 1611 – 13 November 1611	Succeeded by Sir Thomas Rotheram
Preceded by Nicholas Lynch fitz Johnathan	Mayor of Galway; September 1630– June 1631	Succeeded by George Martin fitz Walter
Regnal titles
New title	Baronet (of Menlough); 1622–1635	Succeeded by Thomas Blake
