= Robin Lawless =

Anglo-Norman settler in Ireland

Robin Lawless, Anglo-Norman settler in Connacht, fl. 1248-Easter Sunday, 1260.

== Biography ==
Lawless may have been a member of the Lawless family of east Leinster, who were notable Anglo-Norman settlers in the south County Dublin/north County Wicklow area from the 1220s. The area between the town of Wicklow and Newcastle McKynegan was later known as Lawless County. The Lawless family were of Welsh extraction, apparently tenants of the de Londres family of Oystermouth Castle, Gower.

Lawless is first referred to in Connacht in the Annals of Connacht, sub anno 1248:

- The sons of Magnus, and the son of Conchobar Ruad made a hosting and revolted against the Galls. They burned Mac Henry's castle and captured its warden and carried the preys of North Umall onto the islands of Clew Bay. Then Jordan de Exeter and John Butler and Robin Laigles and many others assembled and marched first to Ballintober and thence to Aghagower, and next day they plundered Umall, north and south.

The same annal notes his death in 1260: Robin Laigles died on Easter Sunday this year.

== Family and descendants ==
Robin Lawless appears to be identical with one Roibeárd Lawless, mentioned in a genealogy by Dubhaltach Mac Fhirbhisigh. He is listed as Roibeárd son of Uilliam son of Nioclás Lawless.

In 1271, Aed son of Comarba Comain O Conchobair was killed by Thomas Butler at Muine Ingine Crechain. Domnall O Flainn was killed by the son of Robin Laigles on the same day, at the southern end of Shrule. The identity of this son is uncertain but may be Uilliam Lawless (died 1316), who is given as the son of Roibeárd son of Uilliam son of Nioclás Lawless.

Members of the Lawless family of Connacht would later hold lands "in the west of County Mayo, broadly in the area between Castlebar and Westport, with claims on Inishbofin and Inishark and a relationship with the Manor of Loughrea in County Galway. It is in these general areas that bearers of the name are still to be found in the 21st century." (p. 91, Martyn, 2011).

== Family tree ==
   Nioclás Lawless (of Gower, Wales?)
   |
   |
   Uilliam Lawless (of Newcastle, County Wicklow?
   |
   |
   Roibeárd/Robin, fl. 1248-60.
   |                                       ?
   |                                       |
   Sir Uilliam Lawless, fl. 1272?-1316.    Thomas, Constable of Connacht, 1285.
  =?
   |                                  ?                  ?
   |                                  |                  |                  
   daughter                           Adam, fl. 1333.    Maurice, fl. 1333.
  =Sén-Brian Ó Dubhda, d. 1354.
   |
   |___________
   |         |
   |         |
   Aodh   Diarmuid
