= Fowberry Tower =

- Northumberland, England, UK
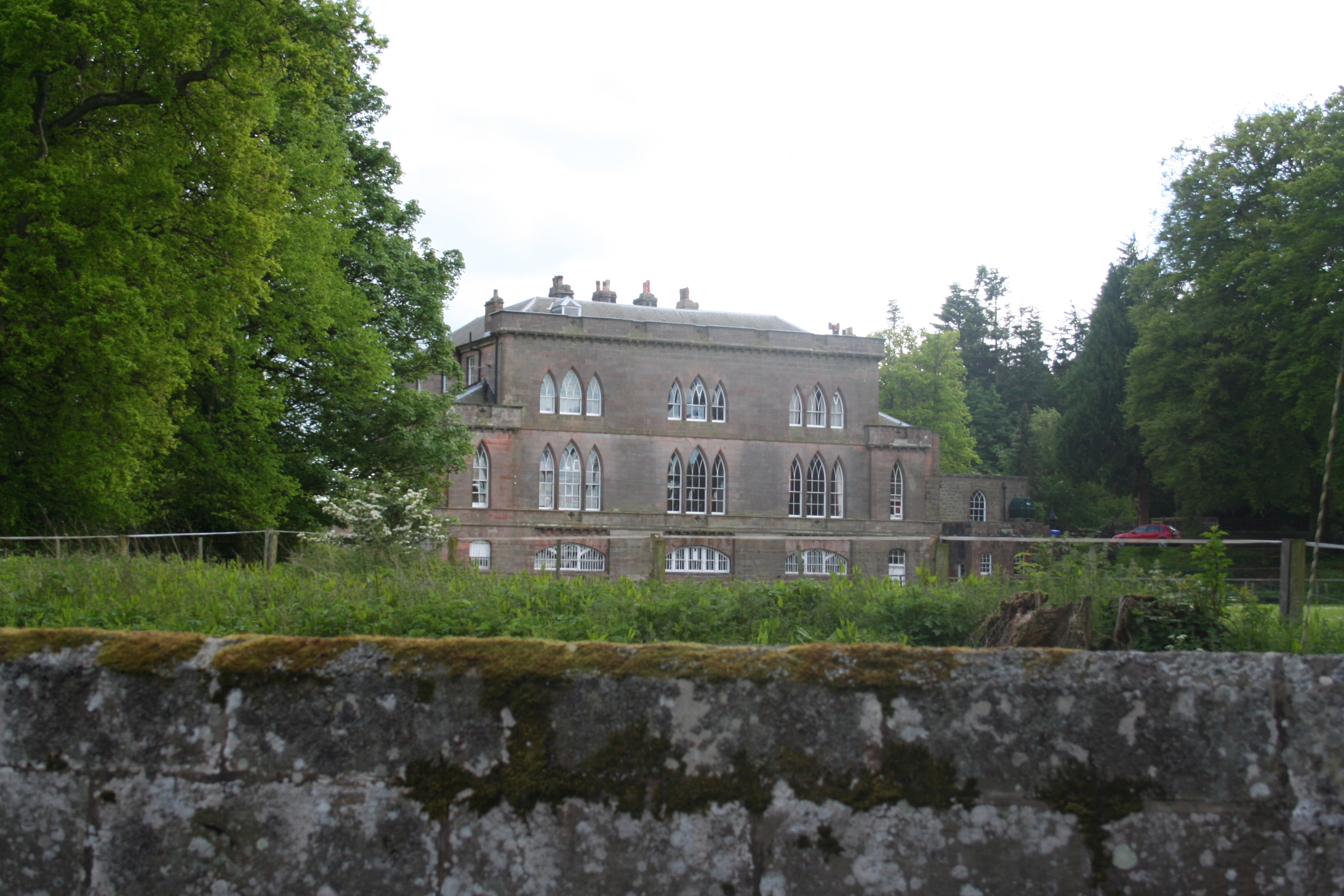

Location
- Location in Northumberland
- Coordinates: 55.558°N 1.940°W
- Grid reference: NU039293

Fowberry Tower is a Grade II* listed mansion house, situated on the banks of the River Till, near Chatton, Northumberland.

The Manor of Fowberry was owned by the Fowberry family for over 400 years, and their 16th-century tower house incorporated the remains of an original pele tower.

In the late 16th century Roger Fowberry mortgaged the estate to his neighbour William Strother of Kirknewton, and despite later legal attempts to dispute the debt, his son was obliged in 1591 to transfer the property to Lancelot Strother.

The Strothers built a new manor house on the site in about 1666. When William Strother died in 1708 without a male heir the estate passed to William Kerr who married Blake’s heiress daughter. In 1776 their son John Strother Kerr sold the estate and house to Sir Francis Blake.

Blake remodelled and substantially enlarged the house including delightful Strawberry Hill Gothic interiors; some of the more important interiors following this style in the North of England. He included the Blake family crest – a martlet surmounting a cap of maintenance – on a frieze in 22-carat gold leaf in the dining room. A new frontage was designed by the architect James Nesbit of Kelso. A feature of the new mansion was the creation of six false windows on the south elevation, which substantially improved the external appearance of the new building but avoided the burden of window tax.

The Blakes sold the estate in 1807 to Matthew Culley (born 1778), son of the noted expert agriculturalist George Culley (born 1735). The design for the front of the house was continued and completed by Matthew Culley, who incorporated a dated medallion stone above the entrance, which reads 1809. A later George Culley of Fowberry was High Sheriff of Northumberland in 1867. The Culley family, later Leather Culley, remained at Fowberry until they sold the estate in 1920.
