= Blake baronets =

Set index for Blake baronets

There have been four baronetcies for persons with the surname Blake, one in the Baronetage of Ireland, two in the Baronetage of Great Britain and one in the Baronetage of the United Kingdom. Two of the creations are extant as of 2026.

- Blake baronets of Menlough (1622)
- Blake baronets of Langham (1772)
- Blake baronets of Twizell Castle (1774)
- Blake baronets of Tillmouth Park (1907)
