= Jan Blake =

British storyteller

Jan Blake is a British storyteller, consultant and coach specialising in myths and folk tales from the Caribbean, West Africa, North Africa and beyond. She has been performing to children, adolescents and adults since 1986 and has an international reputation for dynamic storytelling.

== Life and career ==
Blake was born in Manchester to Jamaican parents. As a young woman, she listened to recordings of the Jamaican poet and folklorist Louise Bennett-Coverley, also known as Miss Lou, who was famous for performing her work in Jamaican Patois. Blake started telling stories in 1986, mainly for financial reasons. The stories she chooses to tell have gradually become more profound. She has also developed her role and now weaves facial expression, gestures, jokes, songs, changes in pitch and volume, and interaction with the audience into her performances.

Blake has been Storyteller-in-Residence for the Hay Literary Festival. In 2012, as part of the World Shakespeare Festival, she was the curator for Shakespeare's Stories.

She has performed at many national and international storytelling and literature conferences and festivals such as the Hay Festival, the Viljandi International Folk Music Festival in Estonia, TEDxWarsaw and TEDx Manchester.

Blake works with major arts organisations such as the National Theatre, BBC Philharmonic Orchestra, London Philharmonic Orchestra, Royal Geographical Society, Natural History Museum, UNHCR, British Council, British Museum, Royal Opera House, British Library, and the Crick Crack Club. She runs workshops, courses and master classes for those wishing to improve their storytelling skills as well as for teachers working with school students within the national curriculum. She is a regular contributor to BBC radio.

In 2023, Blake toured a show with West African born musicians, Kouame Sereba and Raymond Sereba.

Blake has set up her own company and storytelling school called the Akua Storytelling Project.

In 2024 she became the patron/matron of The International Association for Teachers of English as a Foreign Language (IATEFL) for whom she had given plenary speeches in previous years.

== Awards ==
In 2011, Blake was the first non-German to be awarded the Thüringen Maerchen Prize, for a life devoted to the art of storytelling.

In 2013, her performance of The Old Woman, the Buffalo, and the Lion of Manding with West African born musicians, Kouame Sereba and Raymond Sereba, won her a British Award for Storytelling Excellence (BASE).

== Publications ==
In 1998, Blake published Give Me My Yam! a picture book for young children.
