= Japan Association for Language Teaching =

Non-profit professional organisation in Japan

The Japan Association for Language Teaching (JALT), or 特定非営利活動法人全国語学教育学会 (“Specified Nonprofit Corporation – Zenkoku Gogaku Kyoiku Gakkai”) in Japanese, is a non-profit professional organization for foreign language teachers in Japan. Japan's "largest convocation of language educators", JALT has 2,800 members, many of whom are non-Japanese who have settled in Japan. Each member may belong to a local chapter, and has the option of also belonging to Special Interest Groups (SIGs). JALT holds an annual conference, and has done so since 1975. JALT produces a bimonthly magazine, a semiannual journal, and an annual conference proceedings.

== History ==
The first beginnings of the association began with a casual get-together (based on an interest in the Silent Way teaching method) organised in 1975 by Sharon Bode, then Chief Instructor at the Kyoto YMCA. A subsequent meeting was held at the National L.L. School in Osaka in spring 1976, where it was agreed to call the "organization" KALT (Kansai Association of Language Teachers) and the group grew to around 60 members. The group's first event was a KALT-sponsored weekend conference in August 1976 at Kyoto YMCA attended by about 120 people. KALT as a broader organisation came into existence when the Tokai Chapter (representing Tokyo) was formed in 1977, followed in the late 1970s by Chugoku (Hiroshima), Takamatsu (Shikoku), and Nishi-Nippon (Fukuoka). In 1977 KALT became JALT, and in September that year it became the Official Japan Affiliate of TESOL, and by the end of 1978, membership was around 800, alongside 30 commercial members. JALT was granted NPO status (as a nonprofit organization registered with the Tokyo Metropolitan Government) in 1999.

== Chapters ==
JALT now has Chapters throughout Japan, and each member of JALT may belong to one chapter. Chapters take their names from the geographical area that they serve (usually named for their prefecture), although Nankyu is a created name. Chapters sponsor activities for language teachers in their area, and most chapter events are in English, though some are in Japanese.

=== Current chapters ===
- Akita
- East Shikoku
- Fukui
- Fukuoka
- Gifu
- Gunma
- Hiroshima
- Hokkaido
- Ibaraki
- Iwate
- Kitakyushu
- Kobe
- Kyoto
- Matsuyama
- Nagano
- Nagoya
- NanKyu
- Nara
- Niigata
- Oita
- Okayama
- Okinawa
- Osaka
- Saitama, Japan
- Sendai
- Shizuoka
- Tokyo
- Tottori, Japan
- Toyohashi
- West Tokyo
- Yamagata
- Yokohama

== Special Interest Groups ==
JALT now has many Special Interest Groups (SIGs) consisting of members who share a professional interest. Members also have the option of joining one or more SIGs. SIGs provide publications, mailing lists, and are involved with conferences.

=== Current SIGs ===
- Accessibility in Language Learning
- Bilingualism
- Business Communication
- CEFR and Language Portfolio
- College and University Educators
- Computer Assisted Language Learning
- Critical Thinking
- Extensive reading
- Gender Awareness in Language Education
- Global Issues in Language Education
- Intercultural Communication in Language Education
- Japanese as a Second Language
- Learner Development
- Lifelong Language Learning
- Listening
- Literature in Language Teaching
- Materials Writers
- Mind, Brain, and Education
- Mixed, Augmented, and Virtual Realities
- Other Language Educators
- Pragmatics
- School Owners
- Speech, Drama, & Debate
- Study Abroad
- Task Based Learning
- Teacher Development
- Teachers Helping Teachers
- Teaching Younger Learners
- Testing and Evaluation
- Vocabulary

== Conference ==
The full name of JALT's annual conference is Annual International Conference on Language Teaching and Learning & Educational Materials Exhibition. Conferences consist of plenary sessions, featured speaker sessions, and concurrent workshops and presentations. There are about 600 of these, and about 1,600 attendees, and there is a balance between practical presentations and theoretical. The Educational Materials Exhibition (EME) consists of displays of language learning textbooks, reference books and other language education materials.

== Publications ==
JALT's first publication, The Newsletter, began in October 1975, and gradually increased in both size and quality. Its successor, The Language Teacher (TLT), was first published in April 1984. Originally released monthly, in 2009, a decision was made to begin publishing bimonthly in order to concentrate on offering more content online. It is a refereed publication, meaning that articles are subject to peer review, and is distributed in both paper and electronic (online) form.

The first annual conference proceedings publication was called TEFL Japan '77: Collected Papers whereas the most recent was the 2017 release of the JALT Postconference Publication - JALT2016.

The JALT Journal is JALT's applied research journal which was first published in November 1979. It is still published semiannually, in May and November, with an emphasis on linking theory to practice.

== Partner organizations ==
=== International Partners ===
- Bangladesh English Language Teachers Association (BELTA)
- English Teaching Association of the Republic of China (ETA-ROC)
- Far Eastern English Language Teachers' Association (FEELTA)
- The International Academic Forum (IAFOR)
- International Association of Teachers of English as a Foreign Language (IATEFL)
- Linguapax Asia
- Korea Teachers of English to Speakers of Other Languages (KOTESOL)
- Malaysia English Language Teaching Association (MELTA)
- Philippine Association for Language Teaching (PALT)
- The Association of Teachers of English as a Foreign Language in Indonesia (TEFLIN)
- TESOL International Association (TESOL)
- Thailand TESOL (ThaiTESOL)

=== Domestic Partners ===
- Association for Japan Exchange and Teaching Program (AJET)
- Japan Association for Self-Access Learning (JASAL)
- Japan Association for Nursing English Teaching (JANET)
- Japan Association of College English Teachers (JACET)
- The United Associations of Language Studies (UALS)
