= Korea TESOL =

English teachers association in South Korea

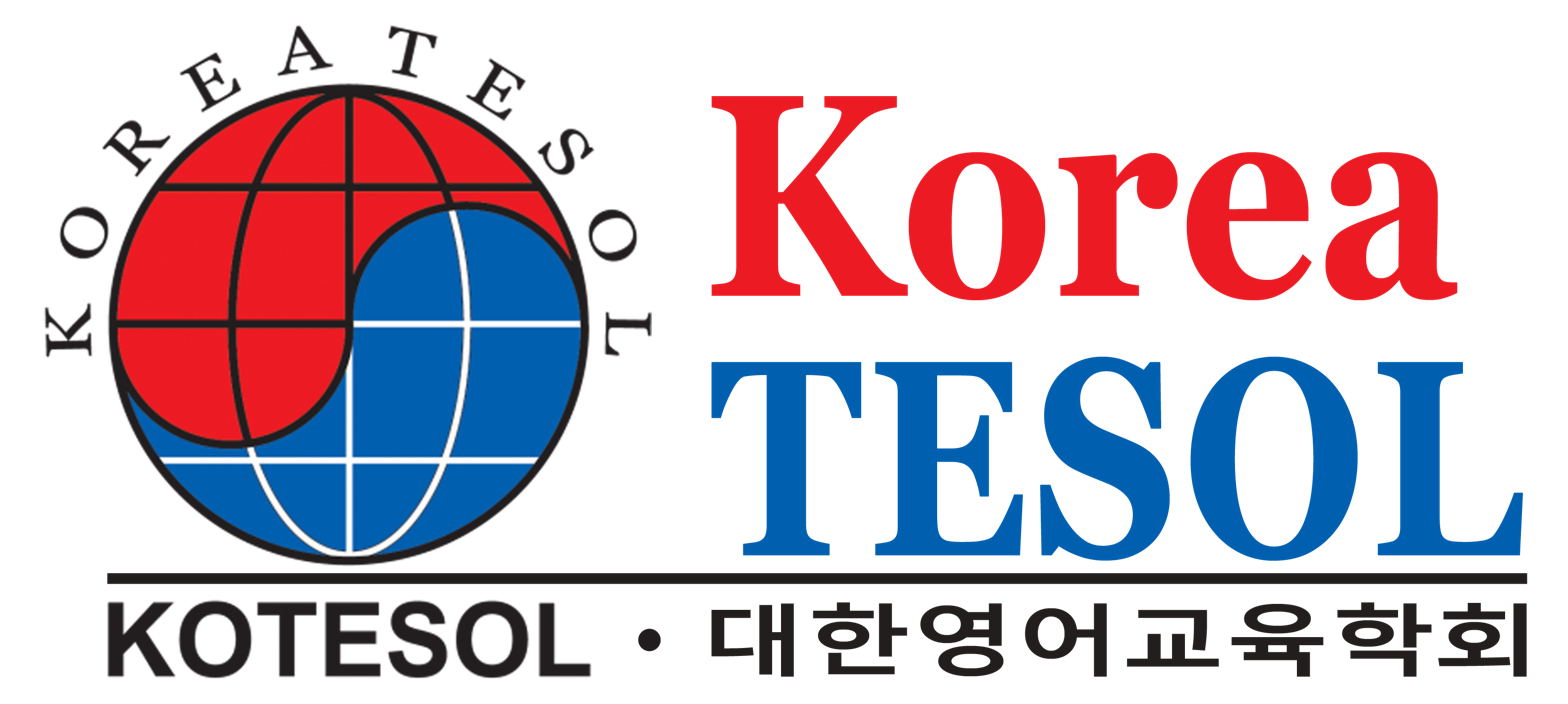
(2018)

Korea TESOL (KOTESOL, Korean: 대한영어교육학회) is the largest multicultural English teachers association in South Korea, organized as a nonprofit scholarly/professional society under the National Research Foundation of Korea and local tax laws since 1993 (initially formed in 1992).

== Overview ==
Korea TESOL is a South Korea based multi-tiered membership organization with regional chapters and nationwide operations such as conferences, publications and Special Interest Groups (SIGs). All memberships are "national" in scope: members can participate in any local or national event with the same membership benefits (discounts), although 50% of their dues are targeted to a member-selected regional chapter. KOTESOL's slogan "Teachers Helping Teachers" is based on an orientation to collegial teacher professional development, including novice teachers new to Korea (and perhaps without an aim for a career in teaching) under the mission statement "to promote scholarship, disseminate information, and facilitate cross-cultural understanding among persons concerned with teaching and learning of English in Korea."

Korea TESOL's membership includes teachers in private and public schools at all levels (K-12, college/university faculty, and hagwon [private language institute] instructors), as well as teachers-in-training, administrators, researchers, materials developers, publishers, and students.

As a result of the COVID-19 pandemic, KOTESOL has fallen in membership numbers from as much as 800 to approximately 350 members in 2021: roughly 25% of members are Korean nationals, the remainder expatriates; nearly 20% of members reside outside of Korea. KOTESOL is known for its conferences (since 1993), print and online publications, and active chapter meetings. An increasing number of members hold higher degrees in language teaching and related fields. Many join for networking opportunities, both social and professional, others come to learn and share practical techniques as well as theories in English language teaching, particularly in the Korean ELT setting.

== History ==
KOTESOL was formed through an amalgamation of memberships from two predecessor organizations, the Association of English Teachers in Korea (AETK) and the Korea Association of Teachers of English (KATE - not the same organization as the society now known as KATE, 한국영어교육학회). These two predecessor organizations gradually wound down from a joint conference (October 24–25, 1992) into a new organization. The first KOTESOL conference was held October 16–17, 1993. KOTESOL inherited TESOL International affiliation from AETK and became an IATEFL associate in 1996. Membership and activity in the organization climbed at a time when larger numbers of foreign teachers were invited to work in Korea, with membership climbing to over 900 in 2013 and conference participation over 1500 around the same time.

== Chapters ==
There are currently (Dec 2018) nine regional chapters in KOTESOL

- Busan-Gyeongnam
- Daegu-Gyeongbuk
- Daejeon-Chungcheong
- Gangwon
- Gwangju-Jeonnam
- Jeonju-North Jeolla
- Seoul
- Suwon-Gyeonggi
- Yongin-Gyeonggi

There have been chapters in Jeju and Kyongju which folded due to lack of members, and the Dajeon-Chungcheong chapter was divided for a short time into Daejeon-Chungnam and Cheongju chapters. International members of KOTESOL are managed separately from the regional chapters.

Most chapters hold regular (monthly) meetings 8 or more times per year, which typically include both academic (training) and social activities. Since the entry of COVID-19 to Korea in February 2020, chapter meetings have been held online.

== Special Interest Groups (SIGs) ==
SIGs are ever-evolving in KOTESOL, reflecting the current focus of teachers. SIGs have included

- Christian Teachers
- Multimedia/CALL
- Content-based Instruction
- Environmental Justice
- Extensive Reading
- Holistic Education
- Reflective Practice
- Teacher Education & Professional Development
- Research
- Social Justice
- Young Learners & Teens

== Conferences ==
KOTESOL's annual International Conferences are the largest language teaching conferences in Korea with more than 200 presentations across two days. Since the first "Joint Conference" in 1992 that led to the founding of KOTESOL, there had been annual conferences each autumn and numerous additional conferences at other times of the year. From 1993 to 2000, these autumn annual conferences were known as "National conferences," since then known as "International Conferences." Since 2006 spring "National Conferences" have been held many years, with 2-4 regional conferences hosted by various chapters most years earlier in the spring. Several conferences have been "webcast," from as early as 1998 (this Pan-Asia conference was hosted/managed by KOTESOL). There have also been some smaller symposiums and conferences late in the autumn (Nov. or Dec.), particularly the Daejeon Chapter Thanksgiving Symposiums.

KOTESOL (International) Conferences ran uninterrupted for 27 years prior to 2020. The COVID-19 pandemic of 2020-2021 has caused all conferences since February 2021 to be "virtual" (no physical attendance). The 2020 International Conference was rescheduled to 2021 due to the coronavirus; however KOTESOL became a sponsor of the AsiaTEFL2020 conference that was hosted in Korea that same year, offering a "members' discount" for conference registration commensurate with the discount AsiaTEFL members received. Since this time the national and international conference event schedules have been flipped, with National Conference 2021 in autumn and International Conferences 2021 and 2022 in spring.

== Publications & Media ==
The quarterly news-magazine The English Connection is the best-known publication, along with the annual KOTESOL Proceedings (select articles from the annual international conference, published roughly 9 months after the conference) and the semiannual Korea TESOL Journal. These are all available online in a moving wall system (access limited to members for a defined period, then open-access) and are complemented by the monthly online/email KOTESOL News and each chapter's own occasional newsletters, plus news as presented solely on the association's official website and through the Facebook group and Facebook page.

A Youtube Channel offers a variety of shorter and longer presentations and publicity-related clips, such as pre-conference promotional talks by invited speakers, videos of activities within the organization, interviews, and full-length conference or chapter presentations. More than 900 subscribers have accessed nearly 120 video clips (as of Oct 30, 2020).

== Partner organizations ==
KOTESOL is an affiliate of TESOL International Association and an associate of IATEFL, as well as a founding partner of the Pan-Asian Consortium of Language Teaching Societies (PAC). KOTESOL's partner associations include:

International Partnerships

- TESOL International Association (TESOL)
- International Association of Teachers of English as a Foreign Language (IATEFL)
- The Pan-Asian Consortium of Language Teaching Societies (PAC)
- CamTESOL (series of conferences in Cambodia)
- English Language Teachers' Association of India (ELTAI)
- English Language Teachers' Association of Mongolia (ELTAM)
- English Teachers' Association of the Republic of China (ETA) (Taiwan)
- Far Eastern English Language Teachers' Association (FEELTA) (Russia)
- Japan Association for Language Teaching (JALT)
- Hong Kong Association for Applied Linguistics (HAAL)
- Macau Association for Applied Linguistics (MAAL)
- Malaysian English Language Teaching Association (MELTA)
- Philippine Association for Language Teaching (PALT)
- The Association for the Teaching of English as a Foreign Language in Indonesia (TEFLIN)
- Thailand TESOL (ThaiTESOL)

Domestic (Korea) Partnerships

- ALAK (Applied Linguistics Association of Korea 한국응용언어학회
- KAFLA (Korea Association of Foreign Language Academies 외국어교육협의회
- KAFLE (Korea Association of Foreign Language Education 한국외국어교육학회
- KAMALL (Korea Association of Multimedia-Assisted Language Learning 한국멀티미디어언어교육학회
- KATE (Korea Association of Teachers of English 한국영어교육학회
- KEERA (Korea English Extensive Reading Association 한국영어다독학회
- PKETA (Pan-Korea English Teachers Association 팬코리어영어교육학회
