= Saving Mes Aynak =

- Directed by: Brent Huffman
- Produced by: Brent Huffman; Zak Piper; Xiaoli Zhou
- Cinematography: Brent Huffman
- Edited by: Brent Huffman, Matt Lauterbach
- Music by: Homayoun Sakhi
- Production company: German Camera Productions Kartemquin Films
- Distributed by: Icarus Films (US); AutLook FilmSales (Int'l)
- Release date: November 2014 (IDFA)
- Running time: 58 minutes
- Country: United States
- Language: English

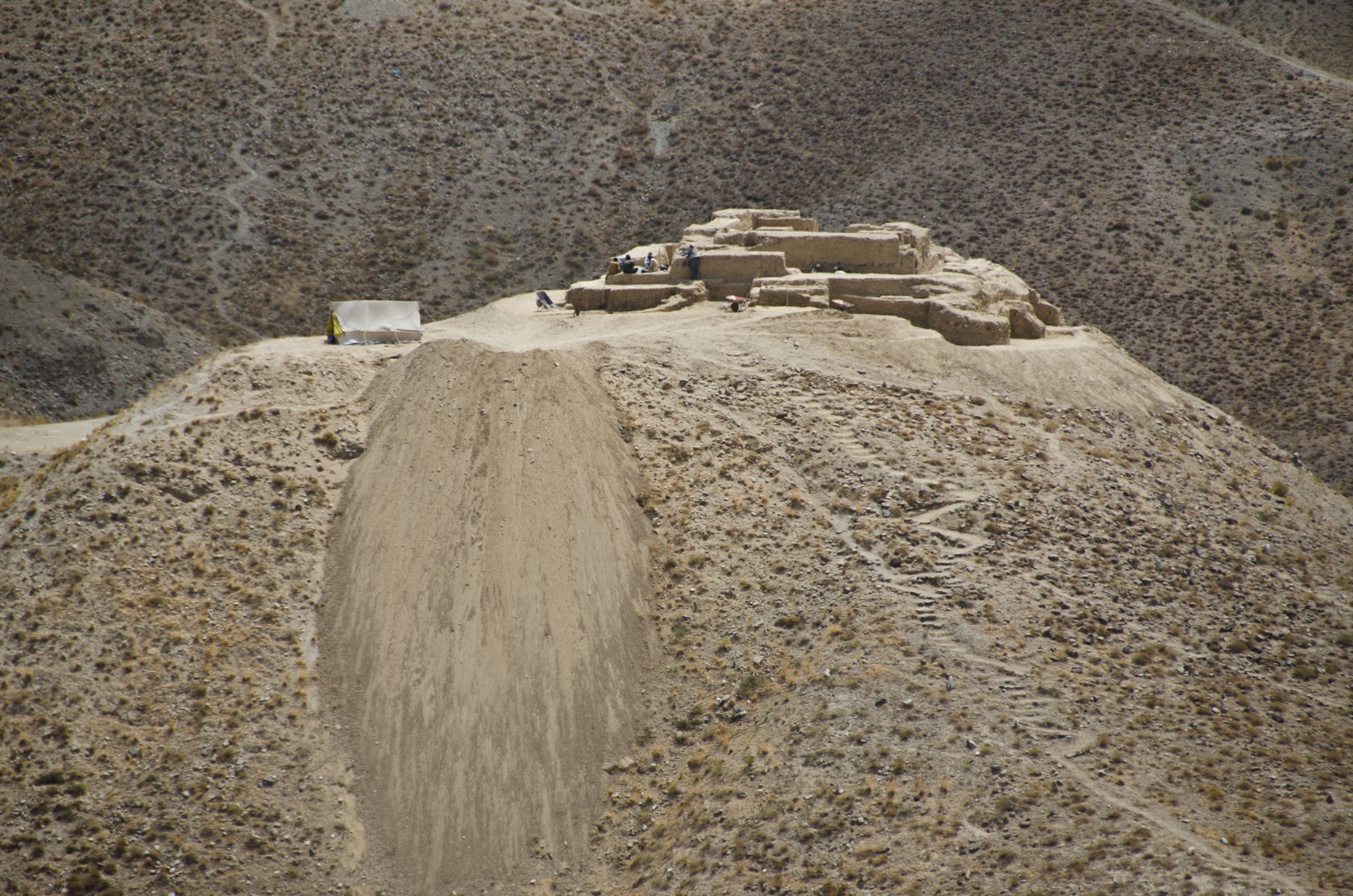
A view of Mes Aynak

Saving Mes Aynak is a 2014 independent documentary film, directed, produced, shot and edited by Brent E. Huffman. It was produced out of Kartemquin Films, the landmark Chicago-based documentary house, along with producer Zak Piper.

It focuses on Afghan archaeologist Qadir Temori and his struggle to save Mes Aynak, a 5,000-year-old archaeological site in Afghanistan which faces demolition. Saving Mes Aynak was the 2014 recipient of a MacArthur Foundation Grant in 2014.

Saving Mes Aynak premiered at the International Documentary Film Festival Amsterdam in November 2014. It later aired on Al Jazeera America and Al Jazeera English networks in July 2015 and was also broadcast on multiple other networks in various countries. In 2016, Saving Mes Aynak premiered on Netflix.

"Saving Mes Aynak" has won over 30 major awards and has been broadcast on television in over 70 countries. It can currently be seen on Netflix, iTunes, Amazon, Google Play and on Special Edition DVD with Icarus Films. The film was directed by Brent E. Huffman. He was awarded The International Academic Forum Documentary Film Award and Reva and David Logan Foundation Grant in 2015 in part for his work on the film.

== Synopsis ==
Saving Mes Aynak examines the archaeological site of Mes Aynak. Though 90% of the site has yet to be excavated, it is threatened by a Chinese state-owned mining company. The copper mining planned there would completely demolish the archaeological site, as well as the surrounding mountain range. Qadir Temori and other Afghan archaeologists must rally against not only the Chinese government, but also the Taliban and local politics to save the historic site.

== Save Mes Aynak Day ==
The filmmakers of Saving Mes Aynak created a "Save Mes Aynak Day" on July 1, 2015, in efforts to promote the preservation of Mes Aynak and the film. The film's director, Brent Huffman, met with Afghan leaders and presented them with a petition signed by 100,000 people favoring site preservation. Huffman also provided the leaders with copies of the film.

== Awards and festivals ==
Saving Mes Aynak continues to screen in theaters, museums, universities across the globe—to the Louvre, Museum of World Culture in Sweden, the National Museum of the Czech Republic, the Rubin Museum of Art NYC, Seattle Art Museum — educating the public across the globe on the issues of cultural heritage, struggles and devotion of archaeologists.

Institution	Country	Category	Year
International Documentary Film Festival Amsterdam	Netherlands	Official Selection	2014
Festival International de Programmes Audiovisuels	France	Official Selection	2015
18th International Vera Film Festival	Finland	Official Selection	2015
Millenium International Documentary Film Festival	Belgium	Official Selection	2015
Full Frame Documentary Film Festival	USA	Official Selection	2015
American Documentary Film Festival	USA	Official Selection	2015
Ahvaz International Science Film Festival	Iran	Best Director	2015
Archaeology Channel International Film and Video Festival	USA	Best Film Best Public Education Value	2015
The International Academic Forum Documentary Film Award	Japan	IDFA Honorary Award	2015
IAFOR Film Asia 2015 and Media Asia 2015 Conference	Japan	Featured Documentary	2015
CinemAmbiente International Environmental Film Festival	Italy	Best Film One-Hour International	2015
Arkhaios Archaeology and Cultural Heritage Festival	USA	Grand Prize Audience Award	2015
Dokufest (International Documentary & Short Film Festival)	Republic Of Kosovo	Official Selection	2015
International Human Rights Film Festival	Albania	Official Selection	2015
The Oriental Institute at University of Chicago	USA	Official Selection	2015
Ho Center For Buddhist Studies at Stanford University	USA	Official Selection	2015
Carnegie Endowment For International Peace	USA	Official Selection	2015
Yale Himalaya Institute	USA	Official Selection	2015
Náprstek Museum Of Asian, African And American Cultures	Czech Republic	Official Selection	2016
Louvre - Journées Internationales du Film sur L’Art	France	Official Selection	2016
Doku.Arts Film Festival: Architecture in Motion	Germany	Official Selection	2015
Gardner Center For Asian Art And Ideas at Seattle Art Museum	USA	Official Selection	2016
Habib University	Pakistan	Official Selection	2016
American University of Afghanistan	Afghanistan	Official Selection	2016
National Museums of World Culture	Sweden	Official Selection	2016
Buddhistdoor - University of Hong Kong	Hong Kong	Official Selection	2016
Festival International du Film sur L'Art (FIFA)	Canada	Official Selection	2016
San Francisco Green Film Festival	USA	Official Selection	2016
Chicago International Film Festival TV Awards	USA	Silver Plaque	2016
Master of Arts Film Festival	Bulgaria	Special Jury Mention	2016
The 37th Telly Awards	USA	Film/Video Best in Documentary	2016
The 37th Telly Awards	USA	People's Choice	2016
American Conservation Film Festival	USA	Green Spark Award	2016
Life After Oil Film Festival in Sardinia	Italy	Best Documentary Award	2016
AGON - the 10th International Meeting of Archaeological Film	Greece	Grand Prix	2016
XVth festival Icronos of Bordeaux	France	Grand Prix & Prix du Public	2016
