= Brent E. Huffman =

American film director

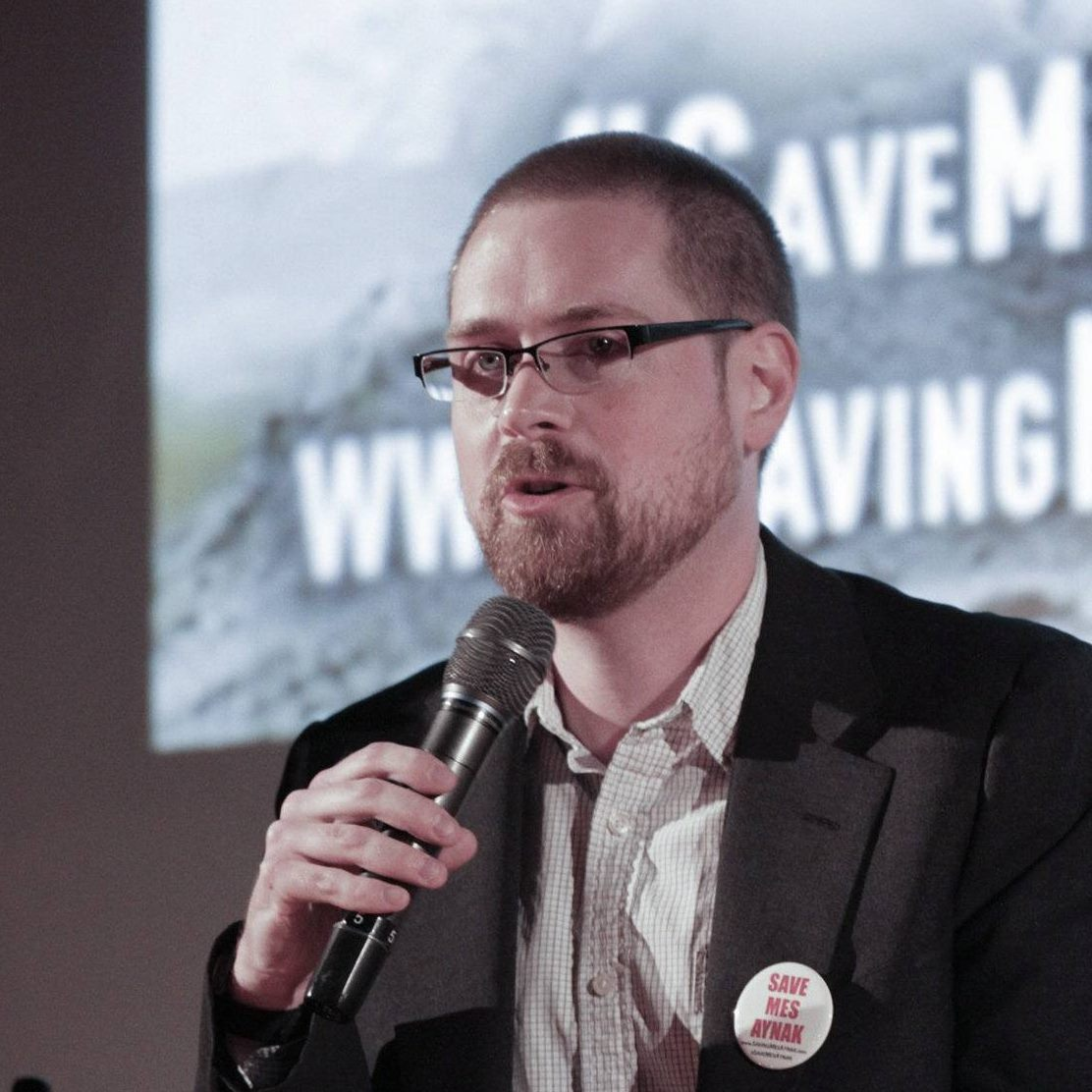
Brent E. Huffman at the Chicago premiere of Saving Mes Aynak (Music Box Theatre, 2015)

Brent Edward Huffman (born September 4, 1979) is an American director, writer, and cinematographer of documentaries and television programs, including Saving Mes Aynak (2015). His work has been featured on Netflix, Discovery Channel, The National Geographic Channel, VICE, NBC, CNN, PBS, Time, The New York Times, Al Jazeera America and Al Jazeera English and premiered at International Documentary Film Festival Amsterdam (IDFA), and many other U.S. and international film festivals. Brent Huffman is the Director of Documentary Journalism and a Professor at the Medill School of Journalism at Northwestern University.

Brent E. Huffman is currently in production on a feature length documentary about Yemeni women saving the cultural heritage of Yemen during the war.

Brent Huffman is a producer of Finding Yingying (2020), an MTV documentary film that premiered at SXSW in 2020 and won the Breakthrough Voice Jury Award. Finding Yingying was nominated for an Emmy in 2021 in the Best Investigative Documentary category. The film is currently streaming on Paramount+.

Brent Huffman's Saving Mes Aynak (2015) has won over 30 major awards and has been broadcast on television in over 70 countries. It can currently be seen on Netflix, iTunes, Amazon, Google Play, and on Special Edition DVD with Icarus Films.

His documentary, Strands of Resistance (2021), examining China's economic relationship with Pakistan, premiered on Vice and Vice News Tonight. A vignette of the documentary called Uyghurs Who Fled China Now Face Repression in Pakistan won a Rory Peck Award in the Best News Feature category at the British Film Institute in London in 2021.

Brent E. Huffman is a multiple Primetime Emmy winner: Natural Heroes (2006), Crime Scene Wild (2007), A Lion in the House (2006), Finding Yingying (2021) nominated.

== Career ==
Born in Spencer, Ohio, Brent E. Huffman studied filmmaking and worked closely with professors and documentary filmmaker Julia Reichert, Steve Bognar, and James Klein. As a student, Huffman worked as an editor on Bognar and Reichert's Emmy award-winning documentary A Lion in the House. The filmmakers also let Huffman use their camera and sound equipment while he worked as a student on a documentary about the Warren County, Ohio, prison. This became his first documentary, Welcome to Warren: Guards and Inmates on Life in Prison, which won a special Award of Recognition by the Grand Jury of The Discovery Channel/American Film Institute's SILVERDOCS Documentary Film Festival in Washington DC. Huffman graduated with summa cum laude honors from Antioch College, Yellow Springs, OH in 2002.

From 2003 to 2005, while pursuing a master's degree in journalism with an emphasis on documentary/television production from the Graduate School of Journalism at University of California, Berkeley, Huffman directed, produced, shot, and edited The Weight of the World (2005), about the growing popularity of weightlifting during the first presidential election in Afghanistan. This film was broadcast on PBS's Frontline/World and Current TV. Huffman co-produced The Women's Kingdom (2006), a short documentary about the matriarchal society of Mosuo ethnic minority in China, with his wife Xiaoli Zhou. Featured on Frontline/World on PBS, The Women's Kingdom went on to win the 33rd Student Academy Awards. Huffman went on to live and work for a year and a half in China filming ethnographic documentaries in remote areas for the China Exploration and Research Society (CERS).

From 2006 to 2008, Huffman taught video production, technique and theory in visual journalism at the Brooks Institute in Santa Barbara, CA. Throughout his teaching stint, Huffman continued to create documentary films focusing on international topics pinned to China. The Colony (2010), exploring China's new economic role in Africa, aired on Al Jazeera. The film screened in the academic and research context as well, with Huffman invited by the U.S. Embassy in Dakar, Senegal, to lead a symposium about China's increasing presence in Senegal. With The Colony, Huffman gave lectures about China's role in Africa at USC's US/China Institute, Princeton University, and Columbia University. Before moving on as a professor at Medill School of Journalism at Northwestern University, Huffman covered Vortex 2, the world's largest tornado research project, for NBC Universal and The Weather Channel.

=== Saving Mes Aynak ===
In 2007, China Metallurgical Group Corporation, a Chinese state-owned conglomerate, bid $3.4 billion for the rights to mine deposits near the village of Aynak. The New York Times reported: "Over the next 25 years, it plans to extract about 11 million tons of copper — an amount equal to one-third of all the known copper reserves in China." Reading further reporting on the New York Times on the involvement of China and U.S. government in the mineral reserves in Afghanistan, Huffman began his research into this subject and began filming in Mes Aynak on his own in 2011. On top of the copper reserve in Mes Aynak, it turns out, is an archaeological excavation site, uncovering "thousands of Buddhist statues, manuscripts, coins, and holy monuments ... Entire monasteries and fortifications ... dating back as far as the third century", according to a National Geographic report. However, the site was surrounded by danger: during his stay, Huffman was never allowed to stay in the Mes Aynak area due to the threat of the Taliban. Huffman went through substantial scrutiny and restrictions from the Afghan and U.S. officials: every time he visited the site, he had to go through the permission process from the Ministry of Culture, Kabul Police, and the local province. The Afghanistan-U.S. embassy declined to be interviewed for the film and did not allow American archaeologists working in Mes Aynak to be interviewed for the film.

By 2012, Huffman's account of the struggles of archaeologists in Mes Aynak was published on CNN, an "Op-Doc" on The New York Times, NPR, the Tricycle Magazine, among others. Huffman traveled around universities and museums around the U.S. showing his footage from Mes Aynak. The footage was also used by the Smithsonian Museum to educate members of the U.S. State Department about the situation at the ancient Buddhist archaeological site in Mes Aynak. Huffman launched a Kickstarter campaign to help Afghan archeologists purchase digital cameras and computers for their facility and to help pay for the film's production costs. The campaign raised more than $35,000 and helped the story of Mes Aynak reach a huge international audience, which resulted in online and street protests against the mining of Mes Aynak. With the donation from Kickstarter and a grant from MacArthur Foundation, Huffman finished the project, which became Saving Mes Aynak. In 2014, Saving Mes Aynak was invited by the President of Afghanistan, Ashraf Ghani, for a private screening. Due to dangers of Taliban and opposition to the demolition of the archaeological excavation site, China Metallurgical Group Corp has delayed its mining operation in Mes Aynak.

In 2014, Kartemquin Films officially announced that it will be producing Saving Mes Aynak and the same year, the film had a world premiere at the International Documentary Film Festival Amsterdam (IDFA), the largest documentary film festival in the world. In 2015, Saving Mes Aynak was broadcast on Al Jazeera America and Al Jazeera English, broadcast and screened throughout over 20 countries.

As of 2016, Saving Mes Aynak continues to be shown widely in universities, museums, and film festivals across the U.S. and around the world. The main subject of the documentary Qadir Temori is now the director of the Afghan Institute of Culture, leading the effort with the Oriental Institute and the Afghanistan U.S. Embassy to create a satellite-based map database of Afghanistan's cultural heritage sites and train young Afghans in the field of archaeology. The film remains free to watch for people in Afghanistan. In 2015,

In an interview with Audience Everywhere, Huffman announced that he is working on a new project on China's presence in Pakistan.

== Awards and honors ==
- 2022: Silver Telly Award in the Documentary Category.
- 2021: Rory Peck Award for Best News Feature
- 2021: Emmy Nomination for Finding Yingying Best Investigative Documentary
- 2020: Chinese Academy Award for Finding Yingying
- 2016: Grand Prix & Prix du Public - XVth festival Icronos of Bordeaux, France
- 2016: Grand Prix - AGON - the 10th International Meeting of Archaeological Film, Athens, Greece
- 2016: Best Documentary Award - Life After Oil Film Festival, Sardinia, Italy
- 2016: The 37th Telly Award and People's Choice Telly Award
- 2016: Chicago International Film Festival, Silver Plaque for the Best Documentary in Art/Humanities category
- 2016: Green Spark Award, American Conservation Film Festival
- 2016: Reva and David Logan Foundation Grant for Saving Mes Aynak
- 2015: Grand Prize and Audience Award for Saving Mes Aynak. Arkhaios Archaeology and Cultural Heritage Festival
- 2015: Best Film One-Hour International Award for Saving Mes Aynak. CinemAmbiente International Environmental Film Festival. Turin, Italy
- 2015: Honorary International Documentary Film Award 2015 from the International Academic Forum. Kobe, Japan
- 2015: “Best Film” and “Best Educational Film” for Saving Mes Aynak at the International Archaeology Film Festival. Oregon
- 2015: Abu Rayhan Biruni Award for Saving Mes Aynak. Ahvaz International Science Film Festival. Iran
- 2014: MacArthur Foundation Grant of $100,000 for Saving Mes Aynak
- 2014: Outstanding Alumni of the Year Award – Wright State University
- 2012: Asia Society - Research Award.
- 2012: Evanston Community Foundation - Research Grant
- 2012: Buffett Institute for Global Studies, Northwestern University - Faculty Research Grant
- 2011: Global Heritage Fund - Research Award
- 2011: CINE Golden Eagle and Telly Award for The Colony
- 2010: Best Documentary Award – Short Category for The Women's Kingdom. Fresno International Film Festival, Italy
- 2007: Primetime Emmy for A Lion in the House – PBS Series
- 2007: Conservation Award and Best Wildlife Film for Crime Scene Wild, Discovery Channel Series
- 2006: International Documentary Association (IDA) Award Nomination for The Women's Kingdom
- 2006: CINE Golden Eagle Award for The Women's Kingdom
- 2005: Student Academy Award for The Women's Kingdom
- 2005: National College Emmy by the Academy of Television Arts and Sciences for What If
- 2005: CINE Golden Eagle Award for The Weight of the World
- 2005: Bronze Award - Worldfest International Film Festival for The Weight of the World
- 2004: Special Award of Recognition by the Grand Jury of The Discovery Channel/American Film Institute's SILVERDOCS Documentary Film Festival for Welcome to Warren: Guards and Inmates on Life in Prison
- 2004: Knight Journalism Reporting Fellowship for The Weight of the World
- 2004: University of California, Berkeley International Reporting Fellowship for The Weight of the World

== Filmography ==
- Saving Mes Aynak (2015)
- Syrian Refugees in Jordan (2012)
- Kiva in Liberia (2012)
- The Colony (2010)
- Sound Tracks: Music Without Borders (2010)
- The Women's Kingdom (2006)
- Shadows and Lies (2006)
- A Death in the Desert (2006)
- The Weight of the World (2005)
- Damming the Angry River (2005)
- East and West - Natural Heroes (2006)
- Built in Kabul (2005)
- Welcome to Warren (2004)
- What If? (TV Movie documentary) (2004)

Other credits:

- Finding Yingying (Documentary) (producer) (2020)
- Utopia in Four Movements (Documentary) (camera operator) (2010)
- A Lion in the House (camera operator, editor) (2006)
- Finding Grace (additional camera operator) (2004)
