= Finding Yingying =

2020 American documentary film

- Theatrical release poster
- Directed by: Jiayan "Jenny" Shi
- Produced by: Jiayan "Jenny" Shi; Brent E. Huffman; Diane Moy Quon
- Cinematography: Jiayan "Jenny" Shi; Shilin Sun
- Edited by: John Farbrother
- Music by: Nathan Halpern; Chris Ruggiero
- Production companies: Kartemquin Films; Mitten Media; Nika Media
- Distributed by: MTV Documentary Films
- Release dates: August 27, 2020 (Middlebury); December 11, 2020 (United States)
- Running time: 98 minutes
- Country: United States
- Languages: English; Mandarin

Finding Yingying is a 2020 American documentary film directed and produced by Jiayan "Jenny" Shi about the disappearance of visiting scholar Yingying Zhang and her family's search to find her.

The film had its world premiere at the Middlebury New Filmmakers Festival on August 27, 2020. It was released on December 11, 2020, by MTV Documentary Films.

== Synopsis ==
Yingying Zhang, a visiting scholar from China in the United States, has mysteriously disappeared after getting into a car. Her family arrives from China distraught looking for answers to discover she has been murdered, as they fight for justice and to bring their daughter's remains back home.

== Release ==
The film was initially set to have its world premiere at South by Southwest in March 2020, however, the festival was cancelled due to the COVID-19 pandemic. The film won the Special Jury Prize for Best Documentary Feature. Instead, the film had its world premiere at the Middlebury New Filmmakers Festival on August 27, 2020. In October 2020, MTV Documentary Films acquired U.S. distribution rights to the film. It also screened at DOC NYC on November 11, 2020. It was released on December 11, 2020.

== Reception ==
=== Critical reception ===
Finding Yingying positive reviews from film critics. It holds an approval rating of 100% on review aggregator website Rotten Tomatoes, based on 25 reviews, with an average of 7.8/10. The site's critical consensus reads, "A compassionate look at a missing person's case, Finding Yingying's touching sincerity will resonate with audiences thanks to its elevated storytelling."
