= Daniel Owassa =

Congolese diplomat

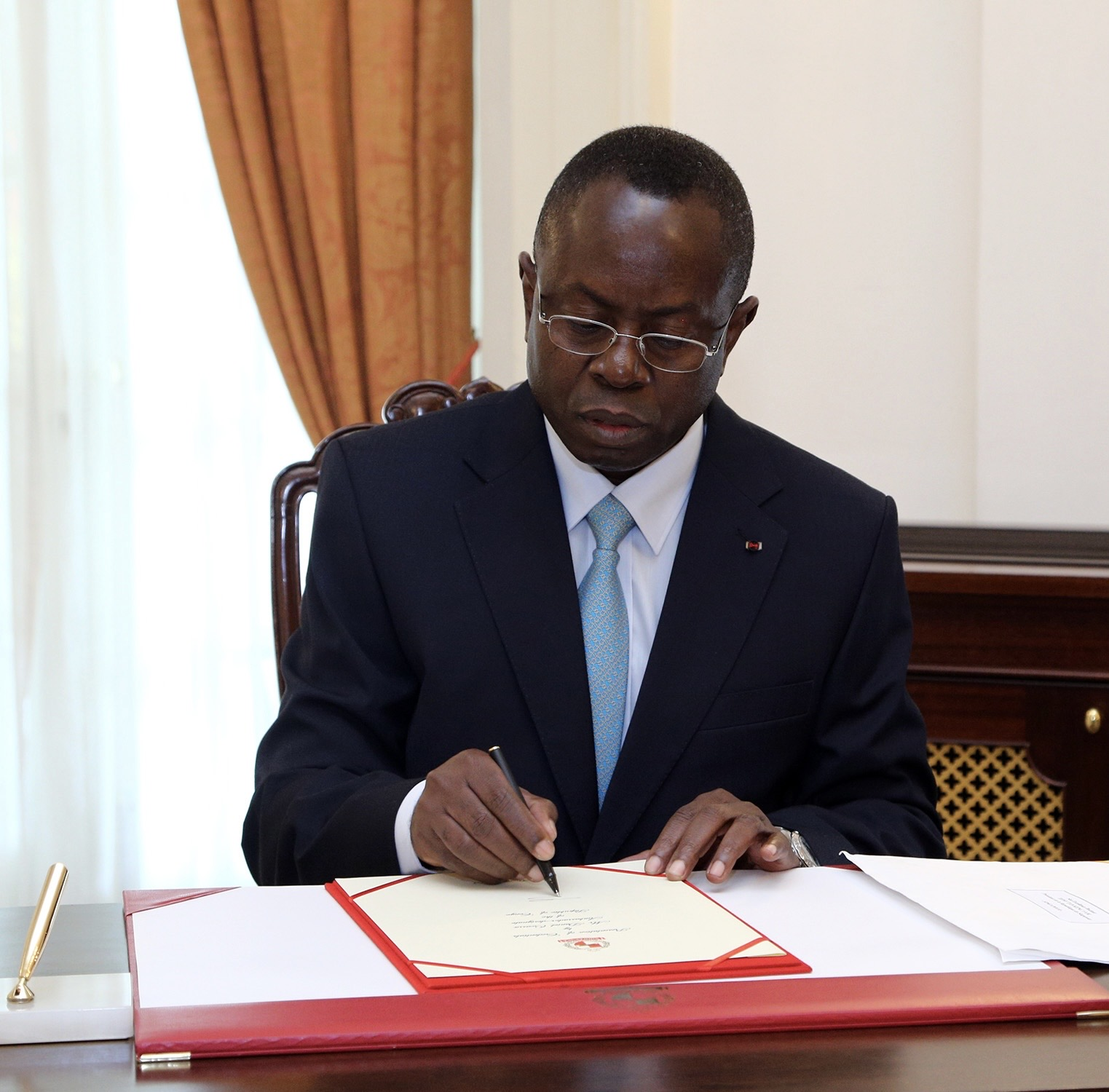
- Daniel Owassa in 2015

Ambassador of the Republic of the Congo to Ethiopia and Permanent Representative to the African Union and the United Nations Economic Commission for Africa
- Incumbent
- Assumed office January 2022
- Preceded by: Lazare Safouesse Makaya

Ambassador of the Republic of the Congo to China
- In office June 2012 – June 2021
- Preceded by: Jean René Koya-Engambé
- Succeeded by: Jacques Jean Luc Nyanga

Secretary-General of the Ministry of Foreign Affairs
- In office May 2005 – May 2012
- Preceded by: Raymond Serge Bale
- Succeeded by: Cyprien Sylvestre Mamina

Secretary of State to the Minister of Public Service and Territorial Administration, in charge of reforms and administrative simplification
- In office 2 September 1996 – 5 June 1997

Personal details
- Born: January 28, 1959 (age 67) Fort-Rousset (now Owando), Republic of the Congo
- Education: Marien Ngouabi University, University of Oxford
- Occupation: Diplomat

Daniel Owassa (born January 28, 1959) is a Congolese diplomat and senior civil servant. He has served as the Ambassador of the Republic of the Congo to Ethiopia and as Permanent Representative to the African Union and the United Nations Economic Commission for Africa.

== Early life and education ==
Daniel Owassa was born in Fort-Rousset (now Owando), Republic of the Congo. He is the son of Barnabas Owassa, a local chieftain, and Simone Abango. He completed his primary and secondary education in Owando and Makoua, earning his high school diploma baccalauréat in 1979.

He obtained a degree in sociology from Marien Ngouabi University in 1982, and a postgraduate diploma in sociology of development in 1983. In 1988, he received a scholarship to study at the University of Oxford, where he earned a diploma in Diplomatic Studies in 1989. His dissertation, titled National Leadership in Africa: The Statistics of Political (In)stability 1960–1988, was published in 2017 and republished in 2019.

== Career ==
=== Ministry of Foreign Affairs ===
Owassa joined the Ministry of Foreign Affairs in 1984. He served as head of the East and Southern Africa Section (1986–1987), head of the Organization of African Unity Section (1987–1988), and special adviser (1989–1990). He was diplomatic attaché to President Denis Sassou-Nguesso (1990–1992) and later diplomatic adviser to Prime Minister (1993–1996).

=== Secretary of State ===
On 2 September 1996, Daniel Owassa entered the Charles David Ganao government as Secretary of State to the Minister of Public Service and Territorial Administration, in charge of reforms and administrative simplification. He held this position until the outbreak of the June 5, 1997 civil war.

=== Return to diplomacy ===
In 2000, he became diplomatic adviser to then Foreign Minister Rodolphe Adada. On 3 May 2005, he was appointed Secretary-General of the Ministry of Foreign Affairs, a position he held until 2012.

=== Diplomatic career abroad ===
In April 2012, Owassa was appointed by the president of the Republic of the Congo Denis Sassou-Nguesso Ambassador of Congo to the People's Republic of China. He was also accredited to Vietnam, Cambodia, Laos, Mongolia, Thailand, the Philippines, South Korea, North Korea, Myanmar, Pakistan, and Singapore. He served in this role until June 2021.

In November 2021, he was appointed Ambassador to Ethiopia and Permanent Representative to the African Union and the United Nations Economic Commission for Africa. His jurisdiction also includes Djibouti and Eritrea. In June 2022 and October 2023, he served as rotating chair of the African Union Peace and Security Council. He represented the Republic of the Congo in formally depositing its instrument of accession to the Organisation of Southern Cooperation (OSC).

== Honours ==
- Grand Officer of the Congolese Order of Merit (2 October 2006)
- Commander of the French Legion of Honour (9 October 1996)

== Personal life ==
Daniel Owassa is married and has four children.

== Publication ==
- National leadership in post-colonial Africa: Statistics of political (in)stability. Our Knowledge Publishing, June 29, 2021. ISBN 978-6203783667.

== See also ==
- Foreign relations of the Republic of the Congo
