= Murder of Yingying Zhang =

2017 American kidnapping, rape, and murder case

- Location: Urbana, Illinois, U.S.
- Date: June 9, 2017
- Attack type: Torture murder, rape, choking, beating, bludgeoning, stabbing, kidnapping, decapitation
- Victim: Yingying Zhang
- Perpetrator: Brendt Allen Christensen
- Verdict: Guilty on all counts
- Convictions: Kidnapping resulting in death; Making false statements (2 counts)
- Sentence: Life imprisonment without the possibility of parole plus 10 years

On June 9, 2017, Yingying Zhang, a visiting Chinese scholar at the University of Illinois Urbana-Champaign, was abducted by Brendt Allen Christensen, a Champaign resident and former physics graduate student at the university. Christensen, who investigators claimed aspired to be a serial killer, lured Zhang into his car at a bus stop on campus posing as a police officer with the promise of a ride after she missed a bus, but then took her to his apartment where he raped and murdered her.

On June 30, 2017, the Federal Bureau of Investigation (FBI) arrested and charged Christensen in federal court. Christensen was tried and convicted of one count of kidnapping resulting in death and two counts of making false statements to agents of the FBI, but the jury deadlocked on whether or not to impose the death penalty. Christensen was thus sentenced on July 18, 2019, to life imprisonment without the possibility of parole plus 10 years.

== Victim ==
Yingying Zhang
- 章莹颖
- Born: December 21, 1990; Nanping, Fujian, China
- Disappeared: June 9, 2017 (aged 26); Urbana, Illinois
- Education: Sun Yat-sen University (BS); Peking University (MS)

Yingying Zhang
- Traditional Chinese: 章瑩穎
- Simplified Chinese: 章莹颖
Transcriptions
Standard Mandarin
- Hanyu Pinyin: Zhāng Yíngyǐng
- Wade–Giles: Chang Ying-ying
Yue: Cantonese
- Jyutping: Zoeng Jing-wing
Southern Min
- Hokkien POJ: Chiuⁿ Êng-éng

Yingying Zhang (Chinese: 章莹颖; pinyin: Zhāng Yíngyǐng; December 21, 1990 – June 9, 2017) was born in the city of Nanping, Fujian, to Ronggao Zhang and Lifeng Ye. Zhang had one younger brother, Zhengyang. She played in a band and had ambitions of becoming a professor in China.

In 2013, Zhang graduated from Sun Yat-sen University at the top of her class. In 2016, she received a master's degree from Peking University. Zhang was a visiting scholar in the Chinese Academy of Sciences before travelling to the United States.

She arrived in the United States in April 2017 to conduct research on photosynthesis and crop productivity for one year in the Department of Natural Resources and Environmental Sciences, within the College of Agriculture, Consumer, and Environmental Sciences, at the University of Illinois Urbana-Champaign. She was considering entering a doctoral program at the University of Illinois. Zhang planned to marry her boyfriend, Hou Xiaolin (侯霄霖), in October 2017.

== Kidnapping ==
CCTV footage showing Zhang entering a black Saturn Astra on the east side of Goodwin Avenue in Urbana

On the afternoon of June 9, 2017, Zhang was traveling on a Champaign-Urbana Mass Transit District (MTD) bus in Urbana, Illinois, to an off-campus apartment complex where she was planning to sign a new apartment lease. She was running late and sent a text message to the leasing agent at 1:39 p.m. to inform them that she would arrive at approximately 2:10 p.m. After riding on one bus, she exited at 1:52 p.m. and tried to transfer to another. However, because she was on the wrong side of the street for boarding, the bus did not stop after she attempted to flag it down. The MTD stated it is against company policy to stop for pedestrians on the wrong side of the street, as to do so would encourage them to run into oncoming traffic.

Zhang then walked to another bus stop a few blocks away at the corner of North Goodwin Avenue and West Clark Street, directly in front of the university's PBS radio and television station, WILL. Surveillance video cameras showed that a black Saturn Astra passed by her at 2:00 p.m. as she waited at the bus stop, and then circled back around the block and stopped where she was waiting at 2:03 p.m. She spoke to the driver for approximately one minute, and then entered the car.

The leasing agent sent a text message to her at approximately 2:38 p.m., but received no reply. As the hours passed, Zhang's friends, aware of her errand and expecting her to return quickly, grew increasingly worried. At 9:24 p.m., an associate professor called police to report her missing.

== Search efforts ==
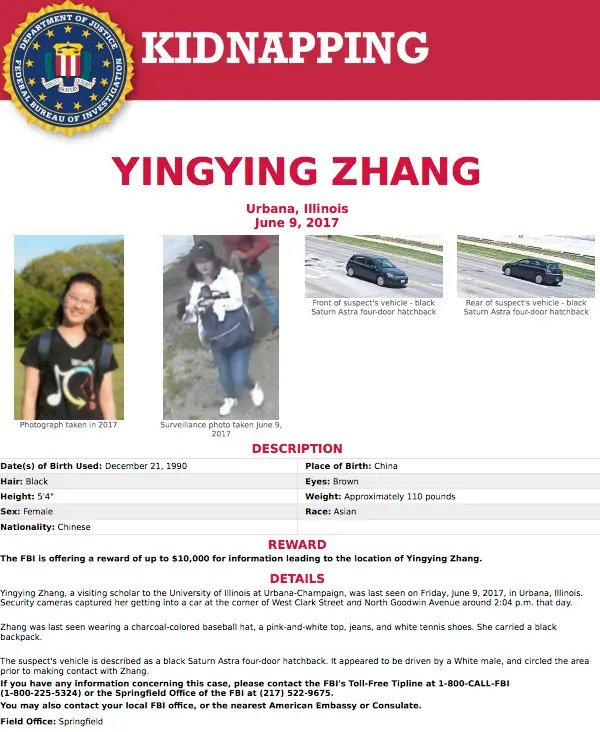
FBI missing person poster for Yingying Zhang

The University of Illinois Police Department and Urbana Police Department worked with FBI agents to locate Zhang, offering a reward of $10,000 for information leading to her location. The university's large Chinese student population helped coordinate search efforts on and around campus. On June 17, Zhang's father, a paternal aunt (her father's sister-in-law), and her boyfriend arrived in Champaign to confer with authorities and to aid in the search. On June 19, the University of Illinois in conjunction with Champaign County Crime Stoppers, announced a reward of $40,000 for information leading to the arrest of the individual or individuals responsible for the apparent kidnapping of Zhang. This reward was, at the time, the largest offered in the 31-year history of the Champaign Crime Stoppers organization. On July 14 the reward was increased to $50,000. Zhang's family said they would not leave the country until she was found. On August 19, Zhang's mother and younger brother also flew to the United States.

Several citizens had reported seeing an Asian woman matching Zhang's description in Salem, Illinois, on June 16. Zhang's family traveled to Salem to follow possible leads and the FBI investigated the reports, but it was later determined that the woman was not Zhang.

The university announced that they planned to install additional, high-definition, security cameras throughout the campus.

== Investigation ==
Investigators were unable to discern the license plate number of the vehicle from security camera footage. However, they determined that there were 18 four-door Saturn Astras registered to owners in the Champaign County area. One of these vehicles was registered to Brendt Allen Christensen, a Champaign resident. Christensen, born 1989, is a former Ph.D. student at the University of Illinois. He graduated from the University of Wisconsin-Madison in 2013 with a bachelor's degree in math and physics and graduated with a master's degree in physics from the University of Illinois Urbana-Champaign in May 2017. Christensen married in March 2011, but at the time of Zhang's murder, Christensen and his wife were in an open marriage, with both of them dating other people.

Investigators interviewed Christensen on June 12, 2017, and inspected his car. When questioned, Christensen reportedly claimed that he did not remember what he was doing at the time of Zhang's disappearance. He later told investigators that he may have been sleeping, or at home playing video games.

On June 14, investigators reviewed the surveillance video footage and observed that the car's sunroof was similar to the one on Christensen's car. They also noted that the car in the video had a cracked hubcap and, upon reinspecting Christensen's car, found that it had a cracked hubcap. They concluded that the car in the footage belonged to Christensen.

On June 15, local police and FBI investigators questioned Christensen and executed a search warrant for his car. The black Saturn Astra was initially towed to a secure bay at the Champaign Police Department, and on June 18 was transported to the FBI Springfield Division's main office in Springfield, Illinois. Investigators noted that the passenger door of his car "appeared to have been cleaned to a more diligent extent than the other vehicle doors", which they said "may be indicative of an attempt or effort to conceal or destroy evidence".

During questioning on June 15, Christensen admitted that he had given an Asian female a ride, but said that he dropped her off after only a few blocks when a wrong turn caused her to panic. Concurrent with this questioning, agents at Christensen's apartment sought and obtained written permission from another occupant of the residence for search and seizure of items at the residence. Agents took possession of computers and a cellphone belonging to Christensen, and subsequently sought and obtained a federal search warrant for a forensic examination of the phone. Law enforcement agencies then placed Christensen under continuous surveillance, beginning on or about June 16. Christensen's girlfriend was approached by FBI investigators and agreed to wear a wire, thinking that it would exonerate Christensen if he had not committed the crime. On June 29, Christensen attended a memorial walk for Zhang with his girlfriend. An affidavit filed by an FBI agent said that in the audio recording, Christensen told his girlfriend he had brought Zhang back to his apartment and held her there against her will. Christensen bragged to his girlfriend that he was a serial killer and that Zhang was his thirteenth victim, but investigators were unable to find any other victims, and doubted this claim.

== Legal proceedings ==
On June 30, the FBI arrested Christensen and charged him with kidnapping under 18 U.S.C. § 1201. According to the law, if a kidnapping results in the death of any person, life imprisonment or the death penalty is prescribed. The FBI report noted that in April, before the alleged kidnapping, Christensen used his cellphone to access the sexual fetish website Fetlife, visiting forums such as "Abduction 101". Christensen had no prior criminal record and no record of disciplinary problems at the university.

At a court hearing on July 5, United States magistrate judge Eric I. Long denied bail for Christensen after hearing submissions from the prosecutor and Christensen's attorneys, Evan and Tom Bruno. Long said that Zhang's body still being missing weighed against Christensen, and that Christensen was the last person to see Zhang. Assistant U.S. Attorney Bryan Freres said that there was no "combination of conditions" where Christensen was not a danger to the community. Freres revealed more details from the investigation not presented in the criminal complaint. He told the court that Christensen had attended a vigil held for Zhang on June 29, where he had described "the characteristics of his ideal victim", and had pointed out those in the crowd who matched them. Additionally, Christensen was recorded saying that Zhang had resisted and fought with him, and he was also recorded threatening someone who then provided incriminating evidence to authorities. Christensen's attorney Evan Bruno argued that he should be released on bail due to his lack of criminal record and his ties to the local community.

On July 12, 2017, a federal grand jury formally indicted Christensen for kidnapping Zhang. The indictment alleges that Christensen "willfully and unlawfully seized, confined, inveigled, decoyed, kidnapped, abducted, and carried away" Zhang "and otherwise held her for his own benefit and purpose, and used and caused to be used a means, facility and instrumentality of interstate commerce, namely, a Motorola cellular telephone and a Saturn Aura motor vehicle, in committing and in furtherance of the commission of the offense". Christensen pled not guilty at his arraignment on July 20, 2017.

Christensen's trial began in June 2019 with his attorney, George Taseff, admitting in the opening statements that Christensen killed Zhang and he was on "trial for his life" because he could face the death penalty. Evidence was provided that before Christensen abducted Zhang, he had posed as an undercover police officer and attempted to abduct graduate student Emily Hogan. He asked Hogan to get into his car, she refused, and he drove off. Hogan reported this to the police and posted about the incident on social media. After picking up Zhang later that morning and taking her back to his apartment, Christensen choked, raped, and stabbed her in his bedroom before dragging her to his bathroom where he beat her with a baseball bat and decapitated her.

On June 24, 2019, the jury deliberated for less than two hours before returning its verdict. Christensen was found guilty of one count of kidnapping resulting in death and two counts of making false statements to agents of the Federal Bureau of Investigation. During sentencing deliberations, the jury could not unanimously agree to sentence Christensen to death. As a result, he was sentenced to life in prison without the possibility of parole on July 18, 2019.

Following the trial, prosecutors revealed information about Zhang's remains that Christensen divulged through his attorneys in November 2018 under an immunity agreement. The day after he killed Zhang, Christensen claimed he put Zhang's dismembered body in three separate garbage bags which he then disposed of in the dumpster outside of his apartment. Over the next two days, Christensen claimed he disposed of Zhang's personal belongings in various dumpsters in the Champaign-Urbana area. The dumpster in which Christensen placed Zhang's remains was emptied three days later and the contents taken to a private landfill in Vermilion County, compacted at least twice, spread over an area fifty yards wide, and subsequently buried under thirty feet of garbage. Recovery of Zhang's remains would be difficult and a search for her remains has not begun. In October 2019, Christensen was transferred to FTC Oklahoma City for evaluation and processing. In early December 2019, Christensen reported to USP McCreary in Pine Knot, Kentucky to begin serving his life sentence. Christensen was transferred to USP Coleman II in Florida in early 2020.

== Memorials ==
On October 11, 2018, a memorial garden was dedicated in honor of Zhang at the corner of North Goodwin Avenue and West Clark Street. Designed by Phyllis Williams and Christina Nordholm, the garden consists of pathways’ stones that were designed to disappear leading to a bench, a weeping cherry tree and a memorial stone. As Zhang's remains were never recovered, a box containing her clothes was buried in the garden.

Memorial garden for Yingying Zhang in Urbana, Illinois
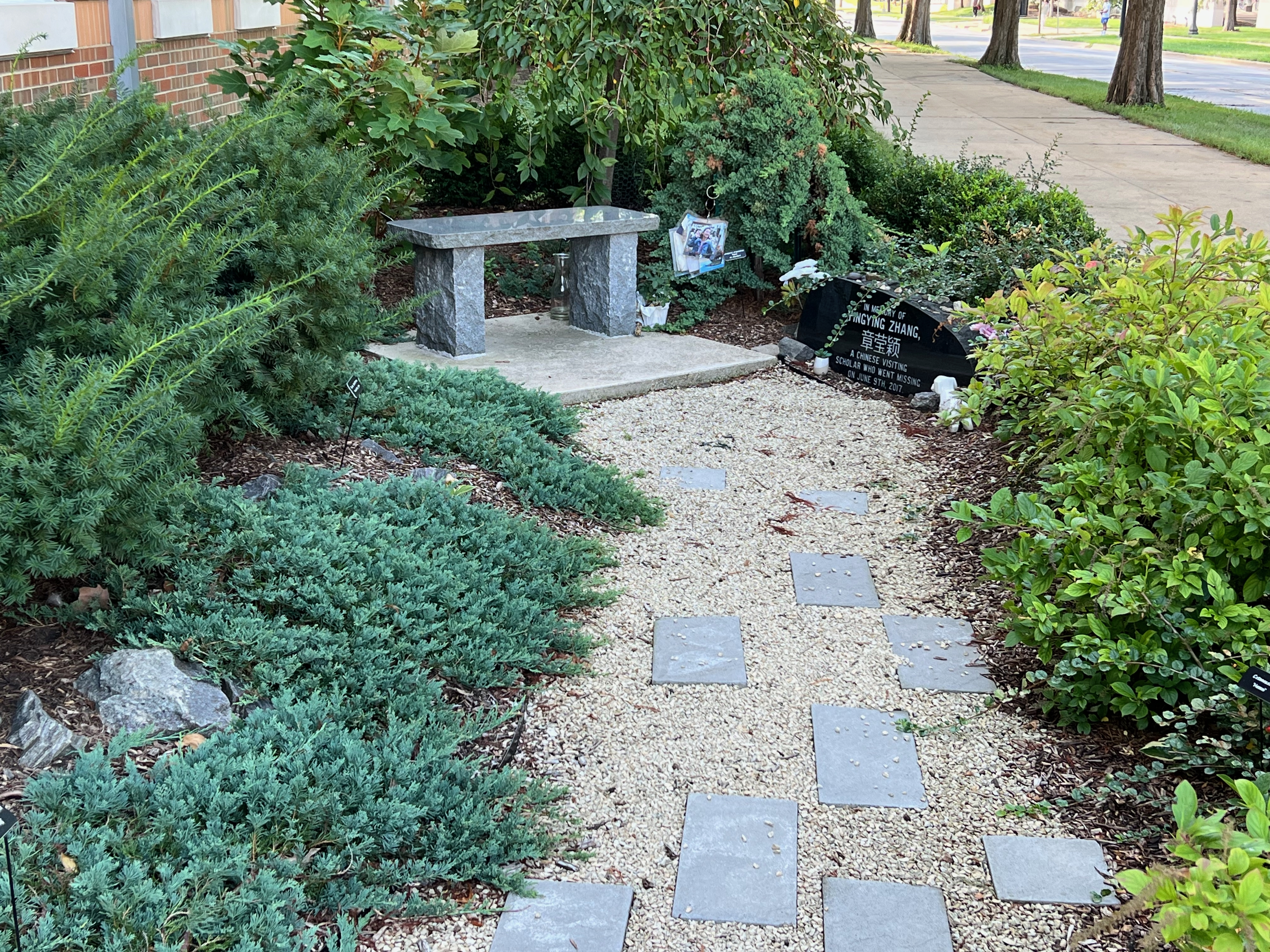
Overview of Zhang memorial garden in 2023

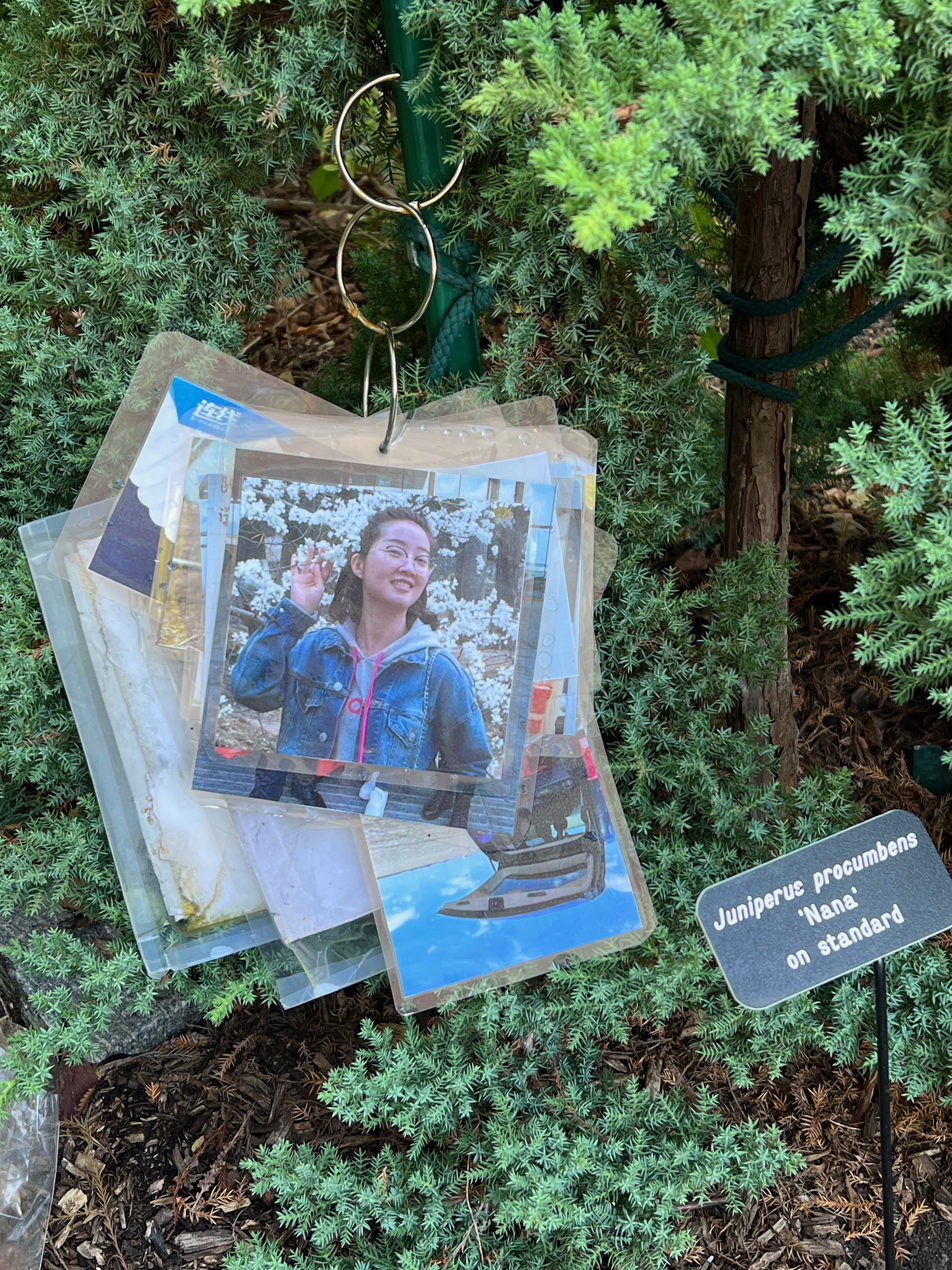
Photos of Zhang in her memorial garden, 2023

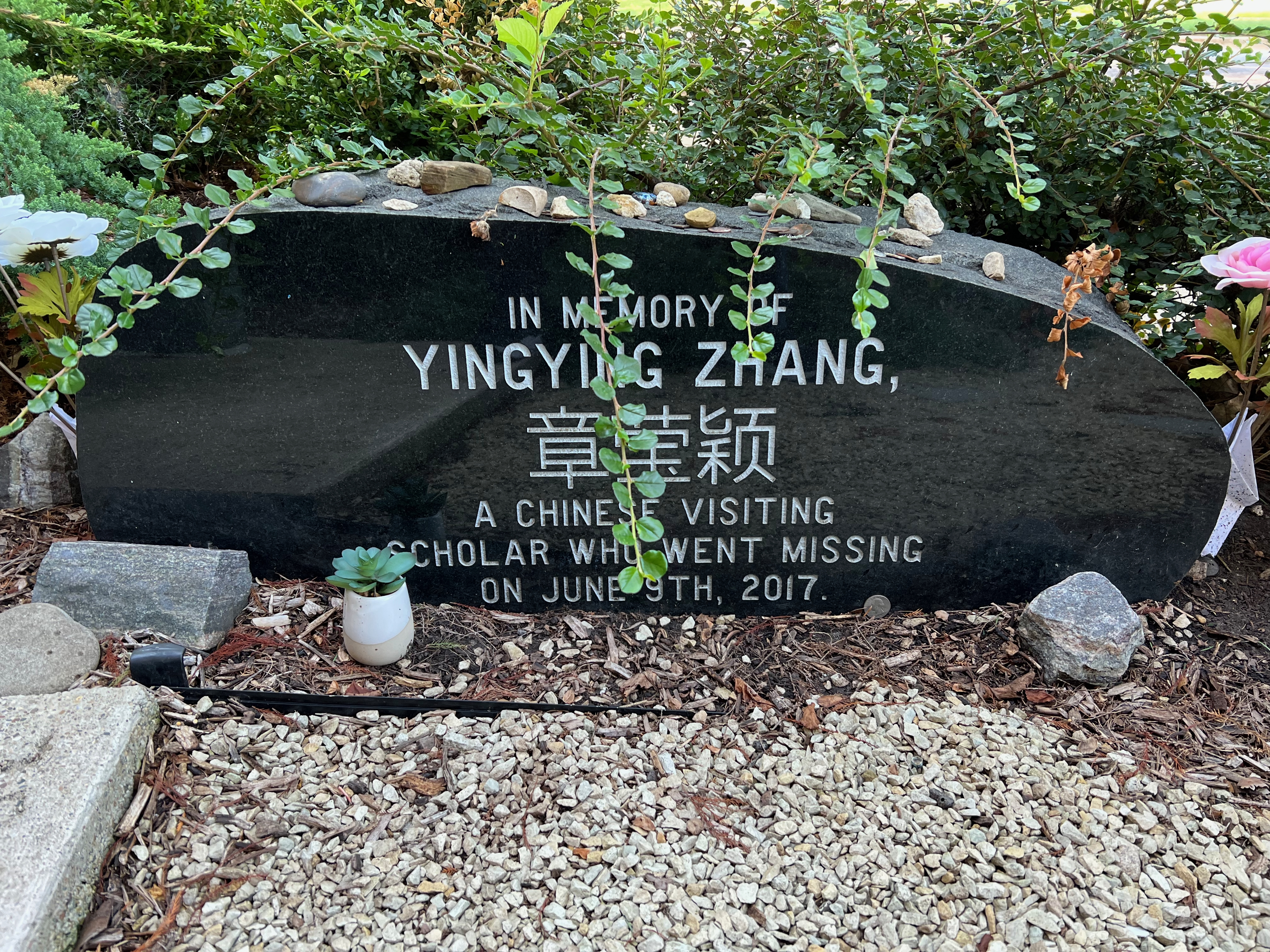
Closeup of stone in Zhang's memorial garden, 2023

On August 19, 2019, Zhang's parents announced the creation of an endowment fund called Yingying Fund, which is dedicated in honor of her. The fund will be used to support international students in crisis and their families. The Zhang family donated an initial gift of $30,000 to the fund with an additional $24,000 contributed from more than 440 donors. The fund is managed by the University of Illinois Foundation.

== Film and television coverage ==
A documentary about Zhang's parents' search for justice, Finding Yingying, premiered at the Middlebury New Filmmakers Festival on August 27, 2020 and was released on December 11, 2020, by MTV Documentary Films.

The case was re-enacted as "Far From Home" on the Investigation Discovery television network true crime series See No Evil in season 6, episode 5 (2020).

The case was featured on the Oxygen television network true crime series Final Moments in season 2, episode 4 titled "Missed Bus" (2023).

== See also ==
- List of homicides in Illinois
- List of kidnappings
- List of solved missing person cases (post-2000)
