= Stuart D. B. Picken =

Scottish philosopher, academic and cleric

Stuart Donald Blair Picken (1942 – 5 August 2016) was a Scottish philosopher, academic and cleric. He was a noted expert on comparative ethics and Japanese thought. In 2007 he was awarded the Order of the Sacred Treasure (gold rays with neck ribbon) by the government of Japan in recognition of his work.

Picken was born in Glasgow in 1942. At the age of sixteen he entered the University of Glasgow where he studied divinity and philosophy, and completed a doctorate on Christianity and the work of Kant. After being ordained in the Church of Scotland in 1966, he was posted as a minister on Orkney.

After visiting Japan on a Rotary Scholarship, in 1972 Picken was appointed Professor of Philosophy at International Christian University in Tokyo, where he remained until 1997. While there, he specialized in ethics and Japanese thought, and in particular shinto, on which he was a noted authority. He was also an adviser on international affairs for the High Priest of the Tsubaki Grand Shrine, and was Director of the Centre for Japanese Studies and Visiting Professor of Japanese Thought at the University of Stirling. He published more than half a dozen books and some 130 articles and papers.

From 1997 to 2004, he was the founding Dean of the Faculty of Foreign Languages and Asian Studies at Nagoya University of Commerce & Business, and the founding Dean of the Graduate School Division of Global Business Communication from 2002 to 2004.

He was the founding Chairman of the Japan Society of Scotland, and Chairman of the International Advisory Board of The International Academic Forum (IAFOR).

After retiring from academia, he came back to Scotland and re-entered the ministry as minister of Blackford in 2005 He was married to Hongwen and had two children, a son and a daughter. He died at the age of 74 on 5 August 2016.

== Works ==
- The Soul of an Orkney Parish:[South Ronaldsay and Burray] (1972)
- Shinto, Japan's Spiritual Roots (1980)
- Buddhism (1982) introduction by Edwin O. Reischauer
- Christianity and Japan: Meeting, Conflict, Hope (1983) introduction by Edwin O. Reischauer
- Essentials of Shinto: An Analytical Guide to Principal Teachings (1994)
- Shinto Meditations for Revering the Earth (2002)
- Sourcebook in Shinto: Selected Documents (2004)
- Historical Dictionary of Japanese Business (2007)
- Historical Dictionary of Shinto (2010)
- Historical Dictionary of Calvinism (2011)
- Death in the Japanese Tradition (2016)
