= Raymond Serge Bale =

Congolese diplomat

Ambassador of the Republic of the Congo to India
- Incumbent
- Assumed office 6 December 2021

Permanent Representative of the Republic of the Congo to the United Nations
- In office 2008–2021
- Preceded by: Basile Ikouébé

Ambassador of the Republic of the Congo to Ethiopia and Permanent Representative to the African Union
- In office 2005–2008

Secretary-General of the Ministry of Foreign Affairs
- In office 2003–2005
- Succeeded by: Daniel Owassa

Personal details
- Born: 1949 (age 76–77) Brazzaville, Republic of the Congo
- Education: University of Leicester; St. John's University
- Occupation: Diplomat

Raymond Serge Bale, born in 1949, is a Congolese diplomat who served as Congo-Brazzaville's Permanent Representative to the United Nations from 2008 to 2021. He is the current ambassador of Republic of the Congo to India.

== Education ==
He received a postgraduate diploma in social sciences from the University of Leicester in the United Kingdom, and later studied government and politics at St. John's University in New York.

== Diplomatic career ==
=== Early career ===
Before entering the diplomatic service, he worked as a teacher. Bale began his diplomatic career in 1981 as Head of the Division of the Joint Intergovernmental Commission at the Congolese Ministry of Cooperation. In 1982, he was appointed Director of Bilateral Cooperation at the Ministry of Foreign Affairs.

From 1985 to 1992, he served as a counsellor at the Permanent Mission of the Republic of the Congo to the United Nations. During that time, while the Congo held a non-permanent seat on the United Nations Security Council, he was a member of the Congolese delegation to the Council.

=== Senior roles ===
From 1994 to 1998, Bale served as Deputy Secretary-General of the Ministry of Foreign Affairs, in charge of political affairs, multilateral cooperation, and Francophone affairs. He later became Secretary-General of the Ministry of Foreign Affairs, Cooperation and Francophone Affairs (2003-2005), and also served as Inspector-General for Diplomatic and Consular Missions.

Between 2002 and 2005, he was a member of the Steering Committee of the New Partnership for Africa's Development (NEPAD). He was appointed Ambassador to Ethiopia and served concurrently as Permanent Representative to the African Union and to the United Nations Economic Commission for Africa, based in Addis Ababa, from 2005 to 2008.

=== Permanent Representative to the United Nations ===
In 2008, After Basile Ikouébé was appointed as Minister of Foreign Affairs in 2007, Bale was appointed to replace him as Permanent Representative to the United Nations in New York. He presented his credentials to UN Secretary-General Ban Ki-moon the same year.

He also served as a member of the United Nations Secretary-General's Advisory Board on Disarmament Matters from 1997 to 1999.

=== Ambassador of Congo to India ===
In 2021, he was appointed Ambassador Extraordinary and Plenipotentiary of the Republic of Congo to the Republic of India by Presidential Decree No. 2021-499 of December 6, 2021 and officially presented his credentials to the President of India Droupadi Murmu, at Rashtrapati Bhavan on September 14, 2022.

== Personal life ==
Raymond Serge Bale is married and has six children.
