= TEDxWarsaw =

TEDx division

TEDxWarsaw – an independently organized event within the TEDx program, taking place in Warsaw since 2010. It is the first and largest TEDx event in Poland. It operates under a license granted by the TED organization, but is organizationally independent from it.

The mission of TEDxWarsaw is to create a space where people from various backgrounds, professions, and generations can share ideas worth spreading. The format of the event is based on short - maximum 18-minute - talks focused on one specific idea, delivered from the characteristic red dot on the stage.

== History and characteristic ==
TEDxWarsaw was founded in August 2009 by Ralph Talmont, Adam Liwiński, and Maciej Michalski. The first edition took place on March 5, 2010, in the Old Library of the University of Warsaw and gathered around 350 participants. In subsequent years, the event grew systematically - the 2014 edition attracted around 1,400 people live, and the online stream was watched by a total of around 42,000 viewers worldwide (peaking at over 14,000 simultaneously). In the same year, the TEDxWarsawPresidentialPalace edition also took place at the Chancellery of the President of the Republic of Poland - the first TEDx event in Poland organized at the headquarters of the head of state.

== Speakers ==
Over 250 speakers have performed across various editions of TEDxWarsaw. Among them were representatives of science, culture, activism, and business.

The stage has featured, among others, actress and philanthropist Anna Dymna (2010), psychotherapist Wojciech Eichelberger (2011), tech entrepreneur Martin Varsavsky (2011), Chief Rabbi of Poland Michael Schudrich (2012), politician Rafał Trzaskowski (2012), nature journalist Adam Wajrak (2013), and mountaineer Leszek Cichy (2025).

== Organization ==
TEDxWarsaw is organized entirely by volunteers.

The organizational team consists of individuals responsible for speaker selection, technical support, marketing and PR, participant registration, and attendee experience during the event.

Since 2022, the Curator of the event has been Ewa Turek.

In accordance with TED licensing rules, financial and in-kind partners have no influence on speaker selection or the event's content.

== Side events ==
In addition to the annual main edition, the TEDxWarsaw team organizes other events under the primary TEDxWarsaw license:

- TEDxWarsawWomen – an event focused on women's topics within the global TEDxWomen program
- TEDxWarsaw Youth – an edition aimed at younger participants, organized by youth
- TEDxWarsawSalon – intimate gatherings focused on specific ideas
- TEDxWarsawPresidentialPalace – the only TEDx event in Poland organized at the seat of the head of state

== Past Events ==
	=== Date ===	=== Venue ===	=== Main Theme ===
1	March 5, 2010	Old Library, University of Warsaw	Collaboration
2	March 24, 2011	Copernicus Science Centre	Looking In Looking Out
3	March 22, 2012	Multikino, Złote Tarasy	Inspire to be Inspired
4	March 21, 2013	Multikino, Złote Tarasy	Poke the Comfort Zone
5	March 13, 2014	Multikino, Złote Tarasy	Embrace the Other
6	March 18, 2015	Polish Theatre in Warsaw	The Little Things
7	March 31, 2016	POLIN Museum of the History of Polish Jews	In a Heartbeat
8	March 23, 2017	Multikino, Złote Tarasy	Crunchtime
9	March 22, 2018	Multikino, Złote Tarasy	Men&Women
10	June 13, 2019	Mała Warszawa	Dare
	2020		not organized
11	June10, 2021	Kinoteka, Palace of Culture and Science	Polarization
	2022		not organized
	2023		not organized
	2024		not organized
12	June 6, 2025	Multikino, Złote Tarasy	Wczoraj. Dziś. Jutro.
13	May 15, 2026	Multikino, Złote Tarasy	Między algorytmem a intuicją

== TEDx Program Rules ==
As a licensed TEDx organizer, TEDxWarsaw adheres to TED guidelines, which include four content rules: no commercial, political, or religious agendas, and presenting only claims based on verifiable, peer-reviewed scientific research.

Talks take the form of short, carefully prepared presentations focused on a single idea.
