= International Association of Teachers of English as a Foreign Language =

Organization based in Britain

International Association of Teachers of English as a Foreign Language (IATEFL) is an organisation in the field of English language learning and teaching. It is based in Britain and was founded in 1967 as ATEFL (it became ‘International’ in 1970), by W. R. (Bill) Lee, who also served as the organisation's first Chairman until 1984.

IATEFL works primarily to develop networks amongst related institutions and individuals involved in language education as it is relevant to the English language. This includes classroom teachers, administrators of language programmes, teacher trainers/educators, writers and publishers, language assessors and examination bodies, and researchers, for example in applied linguistics. The renowned British linguist David Crystal was patron of IATEFL from the mid 1960s until 2023. He was followed as patron/matron by Jan Blake.

IATEFL holds an annual conference in the spring, with key speakers and individual papers, workshops and symposia. Membership is approximately 4000, spread through more than 100 countries. The primary activities for IATEFL members throughout the year are centred on Special Interest Groups (SIGs), which hold various types of meetings, conferences and webinars, and publish newsletters. In addition to these, there is a bimonthly magazine for the whole organisation, IATEFL Voices.

Officers are elected on a regular basis, with a professional staff performing logistics and promotional tasks throughout the year. Membership meets yearly at the Annual General Meeting (AGM) at the main conference.
