= Special interest group =

Community with a shared interest in an area

A special interest group (SIG) is a community within a larger organization with a shared interest in advancing a specific area of knowledge, learning or technology where members cooperate to effect or to produce solutions within their particular field, and may communicate, meet, and organize conferences. The term was used in 1961 by the Association for Computing Machinery (ACM), an academic and professional computer society. SIG was later popularized on CompuServe, an early online service provider, where SIGs were a section of the service devoted to particular interests.

== Technical SIGs ==
The ACM includes many SIGs, some starting as smaller "Special Interest Committees" and formed the first group in 1961. ACM supports further subdivision within SIGs for more impromptu informal discussion groups at conferences which are called Birds of a Feather (BoF).

ACM's Special Interest Groups (SIGs) represent major areas of computing, addressing the interests of technical communities that drive innovation. SIGs offer a wealth of conferences, publications and activities focused on specific computing sub-disciplines. They enable members to share expertise, discovery and best practices.

The Mathematical Association of America has 14 SIGs ranging from the Arts to the Web (for instruction).

The Association for Information Science and Technology calls its organizational divisions special interest groups.

== Non-technical SIGs ==
Organizations that are not technical may also have Special Interest Groups, which are normally focused on a mutual interest or shared characteristic of a subset of members of the organization. An important example for this are trade unions. For identity-based advocacy groups, see identity politics. The Japan Association for Language Teaching has several SIGs. Together they organize a Pan-SIG conference each year.

Mensa International has over a hundred SIGs.

=== Political interest groups ===
These interest groups support and lobby for areas of special need. For example, the Sierra Club focuses on protecting the environment as well as the wild places on earth. They also promote education on preservation of the environment. Similar advocacy groups promote their special interests and organize to help them with their issue. These political "entrepreneurs" are the classic view of the policy maker. Such groups need a patron to provide capital and support, so the cause has to be one that many will support, in competition with other causes that similarly seek support. Many of these dominant groups have subgroups that lobby for more specific issues, but assist in the overall cause.

== See also ==
- Affinity group
- Issue advocacy ads
- Linux User Group
- Organizational structure
