= List of MPs in the first United Kingdom Parliament =

List of MPs

1801–1802 Parliament of the United Kingdom
←	1796–1801 Parliament (GB); 1798–1801 Parliament (Ire)	1802–1806 Parliament	→
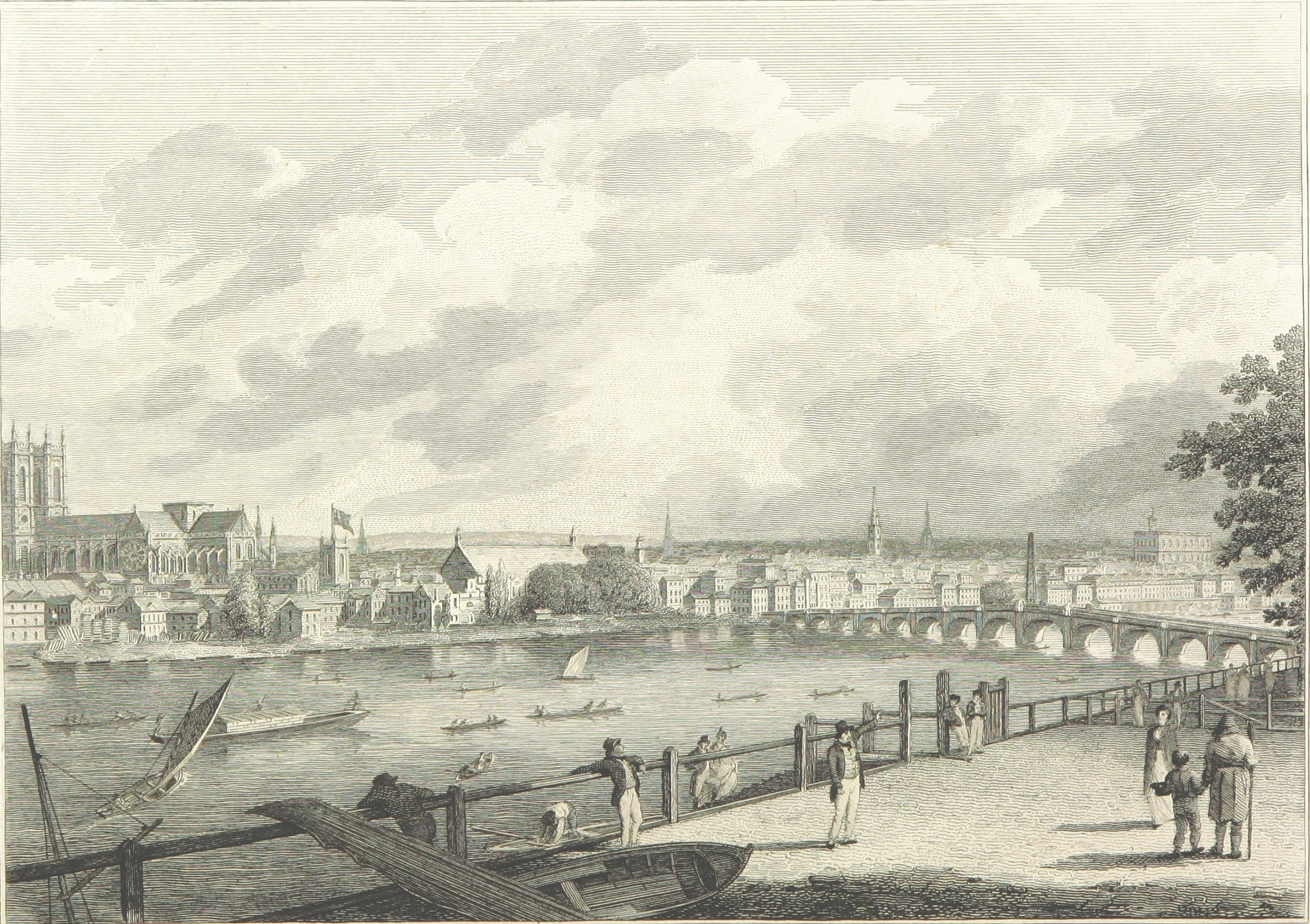
- The Palace of Westminster in 1804

Overview
- Legislative body: Parliament of the United Kingdom
- Jurisdiction: United Kingdom
- Meeting place: Palace of Westminster
- Term: 22 January 1801 – 28 June 1802
- Government: First Pitt ministry (until March 1801); Addington ministry (from March 1801)

House of Commons
- Members: 658
- Speaker: Henry Addington (until 10 February 1801); Sir John Mitford (11 February 1801–9 February 1802); Charles Abbot (from 11 February 1802)
- Leader: William Pitt the Younger (until 14 March 1801); Henry Addington (from 17 March 1801)
- Prime Minister: William Pitt the Younger (until 14 March 1801); Henry Addington (from 17 March 1801)

House of Lords
- Lord Chancellor: Alexander Wedderburn, 1st Earl of Rosslyn (until 14 April 1801); John Scott, 1st Earl of Eldon (from 14 April 1801)
- Leader: William Grenville, 1st Baron Grenville (until March 1801); Robert Hobart, 4th Earl of Buckinghamshire (March 1801–October 1801); Thomas Pelham, 2nd Earl of Chichester (from October 1801)

Crown-in-Parliament George III

Sessions
- 1st: 22 January 1801 – 2 July 1801
- 2nd: 29 October 1801 – 28 June 1802

This is a list of the Members of Parliament (MPs) for the constituencies of the House of Commons of the United Kingdom in 1801, which was the First Parliament of the United Kingdom after the Union with Ireland. The parliament was created by co-opting 100 of the 300 members from the Irish House of Commons into the British Parliament elected in 1796.

Table of contents:

A B C D E F G H I J K L M N O P Q R S T U V W X Y Z By-elections Changes

== A ==
Aberdeen Burghs (seat 1/1)	Alexander Allardyce – died Replaced by James Farquhar 1802	
Aberdeenshire (seat 1/1)	James Ferguson	Tory
Abingdon (seat 1/1)	Thomas Metcalfe	Tory
Aldborough (seat 1/2)	John Blackburn	
Aldborough (seat 2/2)	Charles Duncombe	
Aldeburgh (seat 1/2)	Sir John Aubrey, Bt	Whig
Aldeburgh (seat 2/2)	George Johnstone	
Amersham (seat 1/2)	Thomas Drake Tyrwhitt-Drake	Tory
Amersham (seat 2/2)	Charles Drake Garrard	Tory
Andover (seat 1/2)	Thomas Assheton Smith I	Tory
Andover (seat 2/2)	Coulson Wallop	
Anglesey (seat 1/1)	Sir Arthur Paget	Whig
Anstruther Easter Burghs (seat 1/1)	John Anstruther	Foxite Whig
County Antrim(seat 1/2)	Rt Hon. John Staples	
County Antrim (seat 2/2)	Edmond Alexander MacNaghten	
Appleby (seat 1/2)	Robert Adair	Whig
Appleby (seat 2/2)	John Courtenay	
Armagh	Patrick Duigenan	Tory
County Armagh (seat 1/2)	Hon. Archibald Acheson	
County Armagh (seat 2/2)	Robert Camden Cope	
Argyllshire (seat 1/1)	Lord John Campbell	
Arundel (seat 1/2)	Nisbet Balfour	
Arundel (seat 2/2)	James Greene	
Ashburton (seat 1/2)	Robert Mackreth	
Ashburton (seat 2/2)	Walter Palk	
Athlone	William Handcock	
Aylesbury (seat 1/2)	Scrope Bernard	
Aylesbury (seat 2/2)	Gerard Lake, 1st Viscount Lake	
Ayr Burghs (seat 1/1)	John Campbell II	
Ayrshire (seat 1/1)	William Fullarton	
== B ==
Banbury (seat 1/1)	Dudley Long North	
Bandon	Sir Broderick Chinnery, Bt	Whig
Banffshire (seat 1/1)	Sir William Grant resigned 1801	
Barnstaple (seat 1/2)	John Clevland	
Barnstaple (seat 2/2)	Richard Wilson I	
Bath (seat 1/2)	Lord John Thynne	
Bath (seat 2/2)	Sir Richard Pepper Arden – ennobled Replaced by John Palmer 1801	
Beaumaris (seat 1/1)	The Lord Newborough	
Bedford (seat 1/2)	Samuel Whitbread	
Bedford (seat 2/2)	William MacDowall Colhoun	
Bedfordshire (seat 1/2)	Hon. St Andrew St John	
Bedfordshire (seat 2/2)	John Osborn	
Bedwyn	See Great Bedwyn	
Belfast	James Edward May	Tory
Bere Alston (seat 1/2)	Lord Lovaine	
Bere Alston (seat 2/2)	William Mitford	
Berkshire (seat 1/2)	George Vansittart	
Berkshire (seat 2/2)	Charles Dundas	
Berwickshire (seat 1/1)	George Baillie	
Berwick-upon-Tweed (seat 1/2)	The Earl of Tyrconnel	
Berwick-upon-Tweed (seat 2/2)	John Callender	
Beverley (seat 1/2)	John Bacon Sawrey Morritt	
Beverley (seat 2/2)	Napier Christie Burton	
Bewdley (seat 1/1)	Miles Peter Andrews	
Bishops Castle (seat 1/2)	William Clive	
Bishops Castle (seat 2/2)	Henry Strachey	
Bletchingley (seat 1/2)	Benjamin Hobhouse	
Bletchingley (seat 2/2)	John Stein	
Bodmin (seat 1/2)	Sir John Morshead, Bt	
Bodmin (seat 2/2)	John Nesbitt	
Boroughbridge (seat 1/2)	Hon. John Scott	
Boroughbridge (seat 2/2)	Francis Burdett	
Bossiney (seat 1/2)	Hon. James Stuart-Wortley	
Bossiney (seat 2/2)	John Lubbock	
Boston (seat 1/2)	Thomas Fydell I	
Boston (seat 2/2)	Viscount Milsington	
Brackley (seat 1/2)	John William Egerton	
Brackley (seat 2/2)	Samuel Haynes	
Bramber (seat 1/2)	John Henry Newbolt	
Bramber (seat 2/2)	James Adams	
Brecon (seat 1/1)	Sir Robert Salusbury, Bt	
Breconshire (seat 1/1)	Sir Charles Morgan, Bt	
Bridgnorth (seat 1/2)	John Whitmore	
Bridgnorth (seat 2/2)	Isaac Hawkins Browne	
Bridgwater (seat 1/2)	George Pocock	
Bridgwater (seat 2/2)	Jefferys Allen	
Bridport (seat 1/2)	George Barclay	
Bridport (seat 2/2)	Charles Sturt	
Bristol (seat 1/2)	The Lord Sheffield	
Bristol (seat 2/2)	Charles Bragge	
Buckingham (seat 1/2)	Thomas Grenville	
Buckingham (seat 2/2)	George Nugent	
Buckinghamshire (seat 1/2)	Richard Temple Nugent Grenville, Earl Temple	
Buckinghamshire (seat 2/2)	Marquess of Titchfield	
Bury St Edmunds (seat 1/2)	Sir Charles Davers, Bt	
Bury St Edmunds (seat 2/2)	Lord Hervey	
Buteshire (seat 1/1)	Frederick Stuart	
== C ==
Caernarvon Boroughs (seat 1/1)	Hon. Edward Paget	
Caernarvonshire (seat 1/1)	Robert Williams	
Caithness (seat 0/0)	Alternated with Buteshire. No representation in 1796	
Callington (seat 1/2)	Sir John Call, Bt – died Replaced by John Inglett-Fortescue 1801	
Callington (seat 2/2)	Paul Orchard	
Calne (seat 1/2)	Joseph Jekyll	
Calne (seat 2/2)	Francis Baring, Bt	Whig
Cambridge (seat 1/2)	Edward Finch	Tory
Cambridge (seat 2/2)	Robert Manners	Tory
Cambridgeshire (seat 1/2)	James Whorwood Adeane – died Replaced by Sir Henry Peyton 1802	
Cambridgeshire (seat 2/2)	Charles Philip Yorke	Tory
Cambridge University (seat 1/2)	William Pitt the Younger	
Cambridge University (seat 2/2)	Earl of Euston	Whig
Camelford (seat 1/2)	William Joseph Denison	
Camelford (seat 2/2)	John Angerstein	
Canterbury (seat 1/2)	Sir John Honywood, Bt	
Canterbury (seat 2/2)	George Watson	
Cardiff Boroughs (seat 1/1)	Lord Evelyn Stuart	Tory
Cardigan Boroughs (seat 1/1)	Hon. John Vaughan	
Cardiganshire (seat 1/1)	Thomas Johnes	
Carlisle (seat 1/2)	John Christian Curwen	
Carlisle (seat 2/2)	Sir Frederick Fletcher-Vane, Bt	
Carlow (seat 1/1)	Hon. Henry Sadleir Prittie – ennobled Replaced by Hon. Francis Aldborough Prittie 1801 – resigned Replaced by Charles Montagu Ormsby 1801	
County Carlow (seat 2/2)	William Henry Burton	
County Carlow (seat 2/2)	Sir Richard Butler, Bt	
Carmarthen (seat 1/1)	John George Philipps	
Carmarthenshire (seat 1/1)	James Hamlyn	
Carrickfergus (seat 1/1)	Noah Dalway	
Cashel (seat 1/1)	Richard Bagwell – resigned Replaced by John Bagwell 1801	
Castle Rising (seat 1/2)	Charles Bagot-Chester	
Castle Rising (seat 2/2)	Horatio Churchill	
County Cavan (seat 1/2)	Francis Saunderson	Whig
County Cavan (seat 2/2)	Nathaniel Sneyd	Tory
Cheshire (seat 1/2)	John Crewe	
Cheshire (seat 2/2)	Thomas Cholmondeley	
Chester (seat 1/2)	Viscount Belgrave	
Chester (seat 2/2)	Thomas Grosvenor	
Chichester (seat 1/2)	Thomas Steele	
Chichester (seat 2/2)	George White-Thomas	
Chippenham (seat 1/2)	George Fludyer	
Chippenham (seat 2/2)	James Dawkins	
Chipping Wycombe (seat 1/2)	Earl Wycombe	
Chipping Wycombe (seat 2/2)	Sir John Dashwood-King, Bt	
Christchurch (seat 1/2)	George Rose	
Christchurch (seat 2/2)	William Chamberlayne	
Cirencester (seat 1/2)	Sir Robert Preston, Bt	
Cirencester (seat 2/2)	Michael Hicks-Beach	
Clackmannanshire (seat 1/1)	Sir Robert Abercromby	
County Clare (seat 1/2)	Hon. Francis Nathaniel Burton	
County Clare (seat 2/2)	Hugh Dillon Massy	
Clitheroe (seat 1/2)	Lord Edward Bentinck	
Clitheroe (seat 2/2)	Hon. Robert Curzon	
Clonmel (seat 1/1)	seat vacant Rt Hon. William Bagwell 1801	
Cockermouth (seat 1/2)	John Baynes Garforth	
Cockermouth (seat 2/2)	Walter Spencer Stanhope	
Colchester (seat 1/2)	Robert Thornton	
Colchester (seat 2/2)	The Lord Muncaster	
Coleraine (seat 1/1)	Walter Jones	Tory
Corfe Castle (seat 1/2)	Henry Bankes	
Corfe Castle (seat 2/2)	John Bond – resigned Replaced by Nathaniel Bond 1801	
Cork (seat 1/2)	Hon. John Hely-Hutchinson – ennobled Replaced by Hon. Christopher Hely-Hutchinson 1802	
Cork (seat 2/2)	Mountifort Longfield	Tory
County Cork (seat 1/2)	Viscount Boyle	
County Cork (seat 2/2)	Robert Uniacke Fitzgerald	
Cornwall (seat 1/2)	Sir William Lemon, Bt	
Cornwall (seat 2/2)	Francis Gregor	
Coventry (seat 1/2)	William Wilberforce Bird	
Coventry (seat 2/2)	Nathaniel Jefferys	
Cricklade (seat 1/2)	Thomas Estcourt	
Cricklade (seat 2/2)	Lord Portchester	
Cromartyshire (seat 1/1)	Duncan Davidson	
Cumberland (seat 1/2)	Sir Henry Fletcher, Bt	
Cumberland (seat 2/2)	John Lowther	
== D ==
Dartmouth (seat 1/2)	John Charles Villiers	
Dartmouth (seat 2/2)	Edmund Bastard	
Denbigh Boroughs (seat 1/1)	Thomas Tyrwhitt Jones	
Denbighshire (seat 1/1)	Sir Watkin Williams-Wynn, 5th Baronet	
Derby (seat 1/2)	George Walpole	
Derby (seat 2/2)	Edward Coke	
Derbyshire (seat 1/2)	George Cavendish	
Derbyshire (seat 2/2)	Edward Miller Mundy	
Devizes (seat 1/2)	Henry Addington	
Devizes (seat 2/2)	Joshua Smith	
Devon (seat 1/2)	John Pollexfen Bastard	
Devon (seat 2/2)	Sir Lawrence Palk, Bt	
County Donegal (seat 1/2)	Henry Vaughan Brooke	Tory
County Donegal (seat 2/2)	Viscount Sudley	Tory
Dorchester (seat 1/2)	Hon. Cropley Ashley-Cooper	
Dorchester (seat 2/2)	Francis Fane	
Dorset (seat 1/2)	William Morton Pitt	
Dorset (seat 2/2)	Francis John Browne	
Dover (seat 1/2)	Charles Small Pybus	
Dover (seat 2/2)	John Trevanion	
County Down (seat 1/2)	Viscount Castlereagh	Tory
County Down (seat 2/2)	Francis Savage	
Downpatrick	Clotworthy Rowley appointed to office Replaced by Samuel Campbell Rowley 1801	
Downton (seat 1/2)	Hon. Edward Bouverie	
Downton (seat 2/2)	Sir William Scott – resigned Replaced by Viscount Folkestone 1801	
Drogheda	Edward Hardman	
Droitwich (seat 1/2)	Andrew Foley	
Droitwich (seat 2/2)	Sir Edward Winnington, Bt	
Dublin (seat 1/2)	John Claudius Beresford	Tory
Dublin (seat 2/2)	Rt Hon. George Ogle	Tory
County Dublin (seat 1/2)	Hans Hamilton	Tory
County Dublin (seat 2/2)	Frederick John Falkiner	Tory
Dublin University	Hon. George Knox	Tory
Dumfries Burghs (seat 1/1)	William Johnstone Hope	
Dumfriesshire (seat 1/1)	Sir Robert Laurie, Bt	
Dunbartonshire (seat 1/1)	Sir James Colquhoun, 3rd Bt	
Dundalk	seat vacant Rt Hon. Isaac Corry elected 1801	
Dungannon	Hon. John Knox – died Replaced by Sir Charles Hamilton, Bt 1801	
Dungarvan	Edward Lee	Whig
Dunwich (seat 1/2)	The Lord Huntingfield	
Dunwich (seat 2/2)	Snowdon Barne	
Durham (City of) (seat 1/2)	Ralph John Lambton	
Durham (City of) (seat 2/2)	Sir Henry Vane-Tempest, Bt	
Durham (County) (seat 1/2)	Ralphe Milbanke	
Durham (County) (seat 2/2)	Rowland Burdon	
Dysart Burghs (seat 1/1)	Sir James St Clair-Erskine	
== E ==
East Grinstead (seat 1/2)	Nathaniel Dance-Holland	
East Grinstead (seat 2/2)	James Strange	
East Looe (seat 1/2)	Sir John Mitford – ennobled Replaced by James Buller 1802	
East Looe (seat 2/2)	Frederick William Buller	
East Retford (seat 1/2)	William Petrie	
East Retford (seat 2/2)	Sir Wharton Amcotts, Bt	
Edinburgh (seat 1/1)	Henry Dundas	Tory
Edinburghshire (seat 1/1)	Robert Dundas – appointed to office Replaced by Robert Saunders Dundas 1801	
Elgin Burghs (seat 1/1)	Alexander Brodie	
Elginshire (seat 1/1)	James Brodie	
Ennis	John Ormsby Vandeleur	Tory
Enniskillen	Hon. Arthur Cole Hamilton	Tory
Essex (seat 1/2)	Thomas Berney Bramston	
Essex (seat 2/2)	Colonel John Bullock	Whig
Evesham (seat 1/2)	Charles Thellusson	
Evesham (seat 2/2)	Thomas Thompson	
Exeter (seat 1/2)	John Baring	Independent
Exeter (seat 2/2)	Sir Charles Warwick Bampfylde	Whig
Eye (seat 1/2)	Hon. William Cornwallis	
Eye (seat 2/2)	James Cornwallis	
== F ==
County Fermanagh (seat 1/2)	Mervyn Archdall (senior)	Tory
County Fermanagh (seat 2/2)	Viscount Cole	Tory
Fife (seat 1/1)	Sir William Erskine, Bt	
Flint Boroughs (seat 1/1)	Watkin Williams	
Flintshire (seat 1/1)	Sir Thomas Mostyn	
Forfarshire (seat 1/1)	Sir David Carnegie, Bt	
Fowey (seat 1/2)	Philip Rashleigh	
Fowey (seat 2/2)	Edwartd Golding	
== G ==
Galway	St. George Daly – appointed to office Replaced by John Brabazon Ponsonby 1801	
County Galway (seat 1/2)	Richard Le Poer Trench	
County Galway (seat 2/2)	Richard Martin	
Gatton (seat 1/2)	James Du Pre	
Gatton (seat 2/2)	Walter Stirling	
Glamorganshire (seat 1/1)	Thomas Wyndham	
Glasgow Burghs (seat 1/1)	William McDowall	
Gloucester (seat 1/2)	Henry Thomas Howard	Whig
Gloucester (seat 2/2)	John Pitt	Tory
Gloucestershire (seat 1/2)	Hon. George Cranfield Berkeley	Whig
Gloucestershire (seat 2/2)	Marquess of Worcester	Tory
Grampound (seat 1/2)	Sir Christopher Hawkins, Bt	
Grampound (seat 2/2)	Robert Sewell	
Grantham (seat 1/2)	Simon Yorke	
Grantham (seat 2/2)	George Manners-Sutton	
Great Bedwyn (seat 1/2)	Robert John Buxton	
Great Bedwyn (seat 2/2)	Hon. John Wodehouse	
Great Grimsby (seat 1/2)	Ayscoghe Boucherett	
Great Grimsby (seat 2/2)	William Mellish	
Great Marlow (seat 1/2)	Thomas Williams	
Great Marlow (seat 2/2)	Owen Williams	
Great Yarmouth (seat 1/2)	William Loftus	
Great Yarmouth (seat 2/2)	Henry Jodrell	
Guildford (seat 1/2)	Viscount Cranley	Whig
Guildford (seat 2/2)	Chapple Norton	
== H ==
Haddington Burghs (seat 1/1)	Robert Baird – resigned Replaced by Hon. Thomas Maitland 1802	
Haddingtonshire (seat 1/1)	Charles Hope	
Hampshire (seat 1/2)	Sir William Heathcote, Bt	
Hampshire (seat 2/2)	William John Chute	
Harwich (seat 1/2)	John Robinson	
Harwich (seat 2/2)	Hon Henry AugustusDillon	
Haslemere (seat 1/2)	George Wood	
Haslemere (seat 2/2)	James Clarke Satterthwaite	
Hastings (seat 1/2)	William Sturges	
Hastings (seat 2/2)	Nicholas Vansittart	
Haverfordwest (seat 1/1)	William Edwardes, Baron Kensington – died Replaced by The 2nd Baron Kensington 1802	
Hedon (seat 1/2)	Christopher Atkinson	
Hedon (seat 2/2)	Sir Lionel Darell, Bt	
Helston (seat 1/2)	Charles Abbot	Tory
Helston (seat 2/2)	Lord Francis Osborne	
Hereford (seat 1/2)	Thomas Powell Symonds	
Hereford (seat 2/2)	John Scudamore jnr	
Herefordshire (seat 1/2)	Hon Thomas Harley	Tory
Herefordshire (seat 2/2)	Robert Biddulph	
Hertford (seat 1/2)	Nathaniel Dimsdale	
Hertford (seat 2/2)	John Calvert	
Hertfordshire (seat 1/2)	William Plumer	
Hertfordshire (seat 2/2)	William Baker	
Heytesbury (seat 1/2)	The Viscount Clifden – ennobled Replaced by William Wickham 1802	
Heytesbury (seat 2/2)	Sir John Leicester, Bt	
Higham Ferrers (seat 1/1)	Stephen Thurston Adey – died Replaced by Francis Ferrand Foljambe 1801	
Hindon (seat 1/2)	Matthew Lewis	
Hindon (seat 2/2)	James Wildman	
Honiton (seat 1/2)	George Chambers	
Honiton (seat 2/2)	George Shum	
Horsham (seat 1/2)	Sir John Macpherson, Bt	
Horsham (seat 2/2)	James Fox-Lane	
Huntingdon (seat 1/2)	William Henry Fellowes	
Huntingdon (seat 2/2)	John Calvert	
Huntingdonshire (seat 1/2)	Lord Frederick Montagu	
Huntingdonshire (seat 2/2)	Viscount Hinchingbrooke	
Hythe (seat 1/2)	Hon Charles Marsham	
Hythe (seat 2/2)	William Evelyn	
== I ==
Ilchester (seat 1/2)	Lewis Bayly Wallis	
Ilchester (seat 2/2)	William Dickinson	
Inverness Burghs (seat 1/1)	Sir Hector Munro	
Inverness-shire (seat 1/1)	John Simon Frederick Fraser	
Ipswich (seat 1/2)	Sir Andrew Hamond, Bt	
Ipswich (seat 2/2)	Charles Alexander Crickitt	
== K ==
Kent (seat 1/2)	Sir Edward Knatchbull, Bt	
Kent (seat 2/2)	Sir William Geary, Bt	
County Kerry (seat 1/2)	James Crosbie	Tory
County Kerry (seat 2/2)	Rt Hon. Maurice Fitzgerald; Appointed Commissioner of the Treasury 1801	Whig
County Kildare (seat 1/2)	Maurice Keating	
County Kildare (seat 2/2)	John La Touche	Whig
Kilkenny	William Talbot resigned Replaced by Richard Archdall 1801	
County Kilkenny (seat 1/2)	Hon. James Wandesford Butler	Whig
County Kilkenny (seat 2/2)	Rt Hon. William Brabazon Ponsonby	Whig
Kincardineshire (seat 1/1)	Sir John Wishart-Belsches, Bt	
King's County (seat 1/2)	Sir Lawrence Parsons, Bt	
King's County (seat 2/2)	Denis Bowes Daly	Tory
King's Lynn (seat 1/2)	Hon. Horatio Walpole	
King's Lynn (seat 2/2)	Sir Martin ffolkes, Bt	
Kingston upon Hull (seat 1/2)	Sir Charles Turner, Bt	
Kingston upon Hull (seat 2/2)	Samuel Thornton	
Kinross-shire (seat 0/1)	Alternated with Clackmannanshire. Unrepresented in this Parliament	
Kinsale	William Rowley – appointed Commissioner of Irish Revenue 1801	
Kirkcudbright Stewartry (seat 1/1)	Patrick Heron	Whig
Knaresborough (seat 1/2)	Lord John Townshend	Whig
Knaresborough (seat 2/2)	James Hare	Whig
== L ==
Lanarkshire (seat 1/1)	Sir James Denham-Steuart, Bt	Tory
Lancashire (seat 1/2)	Thomas Stanley	
Lancashire (seat 2/2)	John Blackburne	
Lancaster (seat 1/2)	John Dent	
Lancaster (seat 2/2)	Richard Penn	
Launceston (seat 1/2)	Hon. John Theophilus Rawdon	
Launceston (seat 2/2)	James Brogden	
Leicester (seat 1/2)	Samuel Smith	
Leicester (seat 2/2)	Thomas Babington	
Leicestershire (seat 1/2)	George Anthony Legh Keck	
Leicestershire (seat 2/2)	Sir Edmund Cradock-Hartopp, Bt	
County Leitrim (seat 1/2)	Viscount Clements	Whig
County Leitrim (seat 2/2)	Rt Hon. Theophilus Jones	Tory
Leominster (seat 1/2)	William Taylor	
Leominster (seat 2/2)	George Augustus Pollen	
Lewes (seat 1/2)	Thomas Kemp	
Lewes (seat 2/2)	Hon John Cressett-Pelham	
Lichfield (seat 1/2)	Sir John Wrottesley, Bt	
Lichfield (seat 2/2)	Thomas Anson	
Limerick	Henry Deane Grady	
County Limerick (seat 1/2)	John Waller	
County Limerick (seat 2/2)	William Odell	
Lincoln (seat 1/2)	Humphrey Sibthorp	
Lincoln (seat 2/2)	Richard Ellison	
Lincolnshire (seat 1/2)	Sir Gilbert Heathcote, Bt	
Lincolnshire (seat 2/2)	Robert Vyner	
Linlithgow Burghs (seat 1/1)	Viscount Stopford	
Linlithgowshire (seat 1/1)	Hon. Alexander Hope	
Lisburn	George Hatton	Tory
Liskeard (seat 1/2)	George Murray	
Liskeard (seat 2/2)	Hon. John Eliot	
Liverpool (seat 1/2)	Isaac Gascoyne	Tory
Liverpool (seat 2/2)	Banastre Tarleton	Tory
London (City of) (seat 1/4)	William Lushington	
London (City of) (seat 2/4)	William Curtis	Tory
London (City of) (seat 3/4)	Harvey Christian Combe	
London (City of) (seat 4/4)	Sir John William Anderson, Bt	
Londonderry	Henry Alexander	
County Londonderry (seat 1/2)	Hon. Charles William Stewart	Tory
County Londonderry (seat 2/2)	seat vacant Sir George Fitzgerald Hill, Bt, 1801	
County Longford (seat 1/2)	Sir Thomas Fetherston, Bt	
County Longford (seat 2/2)	Sir William Gleadowe Newcomen, Bt	
Lostwithiel (seat 1/2)	Hans Sloane	
Lostwithiel (seat 2/2)	William Drummond	
County Louth (seat 1/2)	John Foster	
County Louth (seat 2/2)	William Charles Fortescue	
Ludgershall (seat 1/2)	Earl of Dalkieth	
Ludgershall (seat 2/2)	Thomas Everett	
Ludlow (seat 1/2)	Robert Clive	
Ludlow (seat 2/2)	Richard Payne Knight	
Lyme Regis (seat 1/2)	Hon. Henry Fane	
Lyme Regis (seat 2/2)	Thomas Fane	
Lymington (seat 1/2)	(Sir) Harry Burrard (later Burrard-Neale)	
Lymington (seat 2/2)	William Manning	
== M ==
Maidstone (seat 1/2)	Sir Matthew Bloxham	
Maidstone (seat 2/2)	Oliver De Lancey	
Maldon (seat 1/2)	Joseph Holden Strutt	
Maldon (seat 2/2)	Charles Callis Western	
Mallow	John Longfield	
Malmesbury (seat 1/2)	Philip Metcalfe	
Malmesbury (seat 2/2)	Peter Thellusson	
Malton (seat 1/2)	Charles Lawrence Dundas	Whig
Malton (seat 2/2)	Bryan Cooke	Whig
Marlborough (seat 1/2)	Charles Bruce, Lord Bruce	
Marlborough (seat 2/2)	Robert Brudenell	
County Mayo (seat 1/2)	Rt Hon. Denis Browne	
County Mayo (seat 2/2)	George Jackson	
County Meath (seat 1/2)	Hamilton Gorges	
County Meath (seat 2/2)	Sir Marcus Somerville, Bt	
Merionethshire (seat 1/1)	Sir Robert Williames Vaughan	
Middlesex (seat 1/2)	George Byng	Whig
Middlesex (seat 2/2)	William Mainwaring	Tory
Midhurst (seat 1/2)	George Smith	
Midhurst (seat 2/2)	Charles Long	
Milborne Port (seat 1/2)	Henry Paget, Lord Paget	
Milborne Port (seat 2/2)	Sir Robert Ainslie, Bt	
Minehead (seat 1/2)	John Langston (MP)	Tory
Minehead (seat 2/2)	John Fownes Luttrell	Tory
Mitchell (seat 1/2)	Sir Stephen Lushington, Bt	
Mitchell (seat 2/2)	John Simpson	
County Monaghan (seat 1/2)	Richard Dawson	
County Monaghan (seat 2/2)	Warner William Westenra – ennobled Replaced by Charles Powell Leslie II 1801	
Monmouth Boroughs (seat 1/1)	Lord Edward Somerset	
Monmouthshire (seat 1/2)	Charles Morgan (formerly Gould)	
Monmouthshire (seat 2/2)	James Rooke	
Montgomery (seat 1/1)	Whitshed Keene	
Montgomeryshire (seat 1/1)	Charles Williams-Wynn	
Morpeth (seat 1/2)	William Huskisson	
Morpeth (seat 2/2)	Viscount Morpeth	
== N ==
Nairnshire (seat 1/1)	Henry Frederick Campbell	
Newark (seat 1/2)	Thomas Manners-Sutton	
Newark (seat 2/2)	Mark Wood	
Newcastle-under-Lyme (seat 1/2)	William Egerton	
Newcastle-under-Lyme (seat 2/2)	Edward Bootle-Wilbraham	
Newcastle-upon-Tyne (seat 1/2)	Sir Matthew White Ridley, 2nd Baronet	
Newcastle-upon-Tyne (seat 2/2)	Charles John Brandling	
Newport (Cornwall) (seat 1/2)	William Northey	
Newport (Cornwall) (seat 2/2)	Joseph Richardson	
Newport (Isle of Wight) (seat 1/2)	William Hamilton Nisbet	
Newport (Isle of Wight) (seat 2/2)	Andrew Strahan	
Newry	John Moore	
New Radnor Boroughs (seat 1/1)	Richard Price	
New Romney (seat 1/2)	John Fordyce	
New Romney (seat 2/2)	John Willett Willett	
New Ross	Robert Leigh	
New Shoreham (seat 1/2)	Hon. Charles William Wyndham	
New Shoreham (seat 2/2)	Sir Cecil Bisshopp, Bt	
Newton (Lancashire) (seat 1/2)	Peter Patten	
Newton (Lancashire) (seat 2/2)	Thomas Brooke	
Newtown (Isle of Wight) (seat 1/2)	Sir Richard Worsley – resigned Replaced by Sir Edward Law 1801; Replaced by Ewan Law 1802	
Newtown (Isle of Wight) (seat 2/2)	Charles Shaw-Lefevre	
New Windsor (seat 1/2)	Hon. Robert Fulke Greville	Tory
New Windsor (seat 2/2)	Sir William Johnston, Bt	
New Woodstock (seat 1/2)	Charles Moore	
New Woodstock (seat 2/2)	Sir Henry Dashwood, Bt	
Norfolk (seat 1/2)	Thomas Coke	Whig
Norfolk (seat 2/2)	Jacob Astley	
Northallerton (seat 1/2)	Henry Peirse (younger)	
Northallerton (seat 2/2)	Hon. Edward Lascelles	
Northampton (seat 1/2)	Hon. Spencer Perceval	
Northampton (seat 2/2)	Hon. Edward Bouverie	
Northamptonshire (seat 1/2)	William Ralph Cartwright	
Northamptonshire (seat 2/2)	Francis Dickins	
Northumberland (seat 1/2)	Charles Grey	
Northumberland (seat 2/2)	Thomas Richard Beaumont	
Norwich (seat 1/2)	John Frere	
Norwich (seat 2/2)	William Windham	
Nottingham (seat 1/2)	Sir John Borlase Warren, Bt	
Nottingham (seat 2/2)	Daniel Parker Coke	
Nottinghamshire (seat 1/2)	Lord William Bentinck	
Nottinghamshire (seat 2/2)	Evelyn Henry Frederick Pierrepont – died Replaced by Hon. Charles Pierrepont 1801	
== O ==
Okehampton (seat 1/2)	Thomas Tyrwhitt	Whig
Okehampton (seat 2/2)	Richard Bateman-Robson	Whig
Old Sarum (seat 1/2)	Sir George Yonge, Bt – resigned Replaced by Rev. John Horne Tooke 1801	
Old Sarum (seat 2/2)	George Hardinge	
Orford (seat 1/2)	Lord Robert Seymour	
Orford (seat 2/2)	Robert Stewart, Viscount Castlereagh	
Orkney and Shetland (seat 1/1)	Robert Honyman	
Oxford (seat 1/2)	Francis Burton	
Oxford (seat 2/2)	Henry Peters	
Oxfordshire (seat 1/2)	Lord Charles Spencer; Replaced by Lord Francis Spencer 1801	
Oxfordshire (seat 2/2)	John Fane (1751–1824)	
Oxford University (seat 1/2)	Sir William Dolben, Bt	
Oxford University (seat 2/2)	Francis Page – resigned Replaced by Sir William Scott 1801	
== P ==
Peeblesshire (seat 1/1)	James Montgomery	
Pembroke Boroughs (seat 1/1)	Hugh Barlow	Whig
Pembrokeshire (seat 1/1)	Richard Philipps, 1st Baron Milford	
Penryn (seat 1/2)	Thomas Wallace	Tory
Penryn (seat 2/2)	William Meeke	
Perth Burghs (seat 1/1)	David Scott	
Perthshire (seat 1/1)	Thomas Graham	
Peterborough (seat 1/2)	Hon. Lionel Damer	
Peterborough (seat 2/2)	French Laurence	
Petersfield (seat 1/2)	William Jolliffe – died Replaced by Hylton Jolliffe 1802	
Petersfield (seat 2/2)	Sir John Sinclair, 1st Baronet	
Plymouth (seat 1/2)	Francis Glanville	
Plymouth (seat 2/2)	William Elford	
Plympton Erle (seat 1/2)	William Adams – resigned Replaced by The Baron Glenbervie 1801	
Plympton Erle (seat 2/2)	Richard Hankey	
Pontefract (seat 1/2)	Robert Monckton-Arundell, 4th Viscount Galway	
Pontefract (seat 2/2)	John Smyth	
Poole (seat 1/2)	Charles Stuart died Replaced by George Garland 1801	
Poole (seat 2/2)	John Jeffery	
Portarlington	Frederick Trench – ennobled Replaced by William Elliot 1801	
Portsmouth (seat 1/2)	Hon. Thomas Erskine	
Portsmouth (seat 2/2)	Lord Hugh Seymour died Replaced by John Markham 1801	
Preston (seat 1/2)	Lord Stanley	
Preston (seat 2/2)	Sir Henry Hoghton, Bt	
== Q ==
Queenborough (seat 1/2)	John Sargent	
Queenborough (seat 2/2)	Evan Nepean	
Queen's County (seat 1/2)	Sir John Parnell, Bt – died Replaced by Hon. William Wellesley-Pole 1801	
Queen's County (seat 2/2)	Rt Hon. Charles Henry Coote – ennobled Replaced by Henry Brooke Parnell 1802	
== R ==
Radnorshire (seat 1/1)	Walter Wilkins	
Reading (seat 1/2)	Francis Annesley	
Reading (seat 2/2)	John Simeon	
Reigate (seat 1/2)	Hon. John Somers Cocks	
Reigate (seat 2/2)	Joseph Sydney Yorke	
Renfrewshire (seat 1/1)	Boyd Alexander	
Richmond (Yorkshire) (seat 1/2)	Hon. Lawrence Dundas	
Richmond (Yorkshire) (seat 2/2)	Arthur Shakespeare	Whig
Ripon (seat 1/2)	Sir James Graham, Bt	Tory
Ripon (seat 2/2)	John Heathcote	
Rochester (seat 1/2)	Sir Richard King, Bt	
Rochester (seat 2/2)	Hon. Henry Tufton	
County Roscommon (seat 1/2)	Arthur French	Whig
County Roscommon (seat 2/2)	Thomas Mahon	Whig
Ross-shire (seat 1/1)	Sir Charles Lockhart-Ross, Bt	
Roxburghshire (seat 1/1)	Sir George Douglas	
Rutland (seat 1/2)	Gerard Noel Edwardes	Whig
Rutland (seat 2/2)	Sir William Lowther, Bt	
Rye (seat 1/2)	Hon. Robert Banks Jenkinson	Tory
Rye (seat 2/2)	Robert Saunders Dundas – resigned Replaced by The Baron de Blaquiere 1801	
== S ==
St Albans (seat 1/2)	William Stephen Poyntz	
St Albans (seat 2/2)	Thomas Skip Dyot Bucknall	Tory
St Germans (seat 1/2)	Hon. William Eliot	
St Germans (seat 2/2)	Lord Grey	
St Ives (seat 1/2)	William Praed	
St Ives (seat 2/2)	Sir Richard Glyn, Bt	
St Mawes (seat 1/2)	Sir William Young, Bt	Tory
St Mawes (seat 2/2)	Jeremiah Crutchley	
Salisbury (seat 1/2)	Hon. William Henry Bouverie	
Salisbury (seat 2/2)	William Hussey	
Saltash (seat 1/2)	The Lord Macdonald	
Saltash (seat 2/2)	Charles Smith	
Sandwich (seat 1/2)	Sir Philip Stephens, Bt	
Sandwich (seat 2/2)	Sir Horatio Mann, Bt	
Scarborough (seat 1/2)	Hon. Edmund Phipps	Tory
Scarborough (seat 2/2)	Lord Charles Somerset	Tory
Seaford (seat 1/2)	Charles Rose Ellis	Tory
Seaford (seat 2/2)	George Ellis	Tory
Selkirkshire (seat 1/1)	Mark Pringle	
Shaftesbury (seat 1/2)	Paul Benfield	
Shaftesbury (seat 2/2)	Walter Boyd	
Shrewsbury (seat 1/2)	Sir William Pulteney, Bt	Whig
Shrewsbury (seat 2/2)	Hon. William Hill	Tory
Shropshire (seat 1/2)	Sir Richard Hill, Bt	
Shropshire (seat 2/2)	John Kynaston (later Powell)	
Sligo	Owen Wynne	Tory
County Sligo (seat 1/2)	Joshua Edward Cooper	Tory
County Sligo (seat 2/2)	Charles O'Hara	Whig
Somerset (seat 1/2)	William Gore-Langton	
Somerset (seat 2/2)	William Dickinson	
Southampton (seat 1/2)	James Amyatt	
Southampton (seat 2/2)	George Henry Rose	
Southwark (seat 1/2)	Henry Thornton	Independent
Southwark (seat 2/2)	George Tierney	Whig
Stafford (seat 1/2)	Edward Monckton	Tory
Stafford (seat 2/2)	Richard Brinsley Sheridan	Whig
Staffordshire (seat 1/2)	Sir Edward Littleton, Bt	Whig
Staffordshire (seat 2/2)	Lord Granville Leveson-Gower	Whig
Stamford (seat 1/2)	John Leland	
Stamford (seat 2/2)	John Proby, 1st Earl of Carysfort – ennobled Replaced by Albemarle Bertie 1801	
Steyning (seat 1/2)	John Henniker-Major	
Steyning (seat 2/2)	James Lloyd	
Stirling Burghs (seat 1/1)	Alexander Forrester Inglis Cochrane	
Stirlingshire (seat 1/1)	Sir George Keith Elphinstone	
Stockbridge (seat 1/2)	John Agnew	
Stockbridge (seat 2/2)	George Porter	Whig
Sudbury (seat 1/2)	William Smith	
Sudbury (seat 2/2)	Sir James Marriott	
Suffolk (seat 1/2)	Sir Charles Bunbury, Bt	
Suffolk (seat 2/2)	Charles Cornwallis, Viscount Brome	
Surrey (seat 1/2)	Lord William Russell	Whig
Surrey (seat 2/2)	Sir John Frederick, Bt	Tory
Sussex (seat 1/2)	Thomas Pelham – ennobled Replaced by John Fuller 1801	
Sussex (seat 2/2)	Charles Lennox	
Sutherland (seat 1/1)	James Grant	
== T ==
Tain Burghs (seat 1/1)	William Dundas	Tory
Tamworth (seat 1/2)	Thomas Carter	
Tamworth (seat 2/2)	Sir Robert Peel	Tory
Taunton (seat 1/2)	William Morland	
Taunton (seat 2/2)	John Hammet	
Tavistock (seat 1/2)	Lord John Russell – ennobled Replaced by Lord Robert Spencer 1802	
Tavistock (seat 2/2)	Hon. Richard FitzPatrick	
Tewkesbury (seat 1/2)	James Martin	
Tewkesbury (seat 2/2)	Christopher Bethell Codrington	
Thetford (seat 1/2)	John Harrison	
Thetford (seat 2/2)	Joseph Randyll Burch	
Thirsk (seat 1/2)	Sir Thomas Frankland, Bt – resigned Replaced by William Frankland 1801	
Thirsk (seat 2/2)	Sir Gregory Page-Turner, Bt	
County Tipperary (seat 1/2)	Viscount Mathew	
County Tipperary (seat 2/2)	John Bagwell (1751-1816)	
Tiverton (seat 1/2)	Hon. Dudley Ryder	
Tiverton (seat 2/2)	Hon. Richard Ryder	
Totnes (seat 1/2)	Lord Arden	
Totnes (seat 2/2)	Lord George Seymour – resigned Replaced by William Adams 1801	
Tralee	Arthur Moore	
Tregony (seat 1/2)	Sir Lionel Copley, Bt	
Tregony (seat 2/2)	John Nicholls	
Truro (seat 1/2)	John Leveson-Gower	
Truro (seat 2/2)	John Lemon	
County Tyrone (seat 1/2)	Viscount Corry – ennobled Replaced by John Stewart 1802	
County Tyrone (seat 2/2)	James Stewart	
== W ==
Wallingford (seat 1/2)	Lord Eardley	Whig
Wallingford (seat 2/2)	Sir Francis Sykes, Bt	Tory
Wareham (seat 1/2)	John Calcraft	Whig
Wareham (seat 2/2)	Joseph Chaplin Hankey	
Warwick (seat 1/2)	Hon. George Villiers	
Warwick (seat 2/2)	Samuel Robert Gaussen	
Warwickshire (seat 1/2)	Sir John Mordaunt, Bt	
Warwickshire (seat 2/2)	Sir George Augustus William Shuckburgh-Evelyn, Bt	
Waterford	William Congreve Alcock	Tory
County Waterford (seat 1/2)	Rt Hon. John Beresford	Tory
County Waterford (seat 2/2)	Richard Power	Whig
Wells (seat 1/2)	Charles William Taylor	Whig
Wells (seat 2/2)	Clement Tudway	
Wendover (seat 1/2)	John Hiley Addington	Tory
Wendover (seat 2/2)	George Canning	Tory
Wenlock (seat 1/2)	John Simpson	
Wenlock (seat 2/2)	Cecil Forester	
Weobley (seat 1/2)	Lord George Thynne	
Weobley (seat 2/2)	Sir Charles Talbot, Bt	
Westbury (seat 1/2)	Sir Henry St John-Mildmay, Bt	
Westbury (seat 2/2)	John Simon Harcourt	
County Westmeath (seat 1/2)	William Smyth	
County Westmeath	Gustavus Hume-Rochfort	
West Looe (seat 1/2)	John Hookham Frere	
West Looe (seat 2/2)	Sitwell Sitwell	
Westminster (seat 1/2)	Hon. Charles James Fox	Foxite Whig
Westminster (seat 2/2)	Sir Alan Gardner, Bt	Tory
Westmorland (seat 1/2)	Sir Michael le Fleming, Bt	Tory
Westmorland (seat 2/2)	James Lowther	Tory
Wexford	Francis Leigh – resigned Replaced by Ponsonby Tottenham 1801	
County Wexford (seat 1/2)	Viscount Loftus	Tory
County Wexford (seat 2/2)	Abel Ram	Tory
Weymouth and Melcombe Regis (seat 1/4)	Sir James Pulteney, Bt (formerly Murray)	Tory
Weymouth and Melcombe Regis (seat 2/4)	Andrew Stuart – died Replaced by Charles Adams 1801	
Weymouth and Melcombe Regis (seat 3/4)	Gabriel Tucker Steward	Tory
Weymouth and Melcombe Regis (seat 4/4)	William Garthshore	Tory
Whitchurch (seat 1/2)	Hon. William Augustus Townshend	
Whitchurch (seat 2/2)	William Brodrick	
County Wicklow (seat 1/2)	William Hoare Hume	Whig
County Wicklow (seat 2/2)	seat vacant George Ponsonby 1801	
Wigan (seat 1/2)	George William Gunning	
Wigan (seat 2/2)	John Cotes	
Wigtown Burghs (seat 1/1)	John Spalding	
Wigtownshire (seat 1/1)	Hon. William Stewart	
Wilton (seat 1/2)	Viscount FitzWilliam	
Wilton (seat 2/2)	Philip Goldsworthy – died Replaced by John Spencer 1801	
Wiltshire (seat 1/2)	Ambrose Goddard	
Wiltshire (seat 2/2)	Henry Penruddocke Wyndham	
Winchelsea (seat 1/2)	William Devaynes	
Winchelsea (seat 2/2)	William Currie	
Winchester (seat 1/2)	Richard Grace Gamon	
Winchester (seat 2/2)	Henry Temple, 2nd Viscount Palmerston	
Wootton Bassett (seat 1/2)	John Denison	
Wootton Bassett (seat 2/2)	Edward Clarke	
Worcester (seat 1/2)	Edmund Wigley	
Worcester (seat 2/2)	Abraham Robarts	
Worcestershire (seat 1/2)	Edward Foley	
Worcestershire (seat 2/2)	William Lygon	
== Y ==
Yarmouth (Isle of Wight) (seat 1/2)	Jervoise Clarke Jervoise	Whig
Yarmouth (Isle of Wight) (seat 2/2)	William Peachy	
York (seat 1/2)	Sir William Mordaunt Milner, Bt	Whig
York (seat 2/2)	Richard Slater Milnes	Tory
Yorkshire (seat 1/2)	William Wilberforce	Tory
Yorkshire (seat 2/2)	Hon. Henry Lascelles	Tory
Youghal	Sir John Keane, Bt	Tory

== By-elections ==
- List of United Kingdom by-elections (1801–06)

== See also ==
- 1796 British general election
- List of parliaments of the United Kingdom
- Members of the 1st UK Parliament from Ireland
- Unreformed House of Commons
