= Members of the 1st UK Parliament from Ireland =

MPs from Ireland elected or chosen to sit from 1801 to 1802

1st Parliament	(1801)
2nd Parliament	(1802)
3rd Parliament	(1806)

This is a list of the Irish MPs who were co-opted from the former Parliament of Ireland, to serve as members of the 1st UK Parliament from Ireland, or who were elected at subsequent by-elections. There were 100 seats representing Ireland in this Parliament.

The United Kingdom came into existence on 1 January 1801, so the terms of all the original Westminster MPs from Ireland are deemed to begin on that date. The 1st United Kingdom Parliament assembled on 22 January 1801 and was dissolved on 29 June 1802 (a length of one year, five months and seven days).

== Summary of MPs by party (Ireland only) ==
The names of MPs and votes for candidates at by-elections are based on Walker. Party labels are based on those used by Stooks Smith and may differ from those in other sources. Many early nineteenth century Irish MPs are not classified by party, by Stooks Smith.

In some cases, when a party label is used for the MP by Stooks Smith in a subsequent Parliament, this is noted in the Members list below.

Party	Seats 1 January 1801	Seats Dissolution
Tory	29	34
Whig	14	16
unclassified	53	50
vacant	4	0
Total	100	100

== Members by constituency ==
The list is given in alphabetical order by constituency. The County prefixes used for county constituencies is disregarded in determining alphabetical order, but the county follows any borough or city constituency with the same name.

The name of an MP who served during the Parliament, but who was not the holder of a seat at the dissolution in 1802, is given in italics. When the date of the election is in italics, this indicates a by-election.

No election took place on 1 January 1801. The old Irish House of Commons had had 300 members, but only 100 would be co-opted into a seat in Westminster. 200 MPs were removed by:

- disenfranchising the 84 least-populous Irish parliamentary boroughs (thereby eliminating 168 MPs)
- 6 of the other county boroughs, the university constituency, and the other 25 most populous boroughs were reduced from 2 MPs to one MP each (thereby eliminating 32 MPs)

The MPs for constituencies which retained two members after the Union (the thirty-two counties and the county boroughs of Cork and Dublin), continued in office. In the 32 constituencies which were reduced from two MPs to one, there was a drawing of lots to determine which member would serve at Westminster. This took place in the former Commons chamber in Dublin on 2 October 1800, with the members having their names written on paper and placed in a glass bowl, and then one being drawn by the Clerk of the Crown or his deputy. It was also permitted for one member to volunteer to vacate his seat, allowing further opportunities for bargaining and corruption.

If one seat in a Parliament of Ireland constituency were vacant, the remaining member continued in office. If both seats were vacant, as was the case in Clonmel and Dundalk, then a by-election was held to fill the vacancy.

Election	Constituency	Member	Party	Notes
1801, 1 January	County Antrim; 2 members	Rt Hon. John Staples		
1801, 1 January	County Antrim; 2 members	Edmond Alexander MacNaghten		Classified Tory in the 2nd Parliament
1801, 1 January	Armagh	Patrick Duigenan	Tory	Appointed Commissioner of Compensation 1801
1801, 2 March (Note: An unopposed return (applies to by-elections only).)	Armagh	Patrick Duigenan	Tory	
1801, 1 January	County Armagh; 2 members	Hon. Archibald Acheson		Classified Tory in the 2nd Parliament
1801, 1 January	County Armagh; 2 members	Robert Camden Cope		
1801, 1 January	Athlone	William Handcock		
1801, 1 January	Bandon	Sir Broderick Chinnery, Bt	Whig	
1801, 1 January	Belfast	James Edward May	Tory	
1801, 1 January	Carlow	Hon. Henry Sadleir Prittie		The 2nd Baron Dunalley from 3 January 1801
1801, 21 March	Carlow	Hon. Francis Aldborough Prittie		Resigned
1801, 30 July	Carlow	Charles Montague Ormsby	Tory	
1801, 1 January	County Carlow; 2 members	William Henry Burton		
1801, 1 January	County Carlow; 2 members	Sir Richard Butler, Bt		
1801, 1 January	Carrickfergus	Noah Dalway		
1801, 1 January	Cashel	Richard Bagwell		Resigned
1801, 9 December	Cashel	John Bagwell (c. 1780-1806)		
1801, 1 January	County Cavan; 2 members	Francis Saunderson	Whig	
1801, 1 January	County Cavan; 2 members	Nathaniel Sneyd	Tory	
1801, 1 January	County Clare; 2 members	Hon. Francis Nathaniel Burton		
1801, 1 January	County Clare; 2 members	Hugh Dillon Massy		
1801, 1 January	Clonmel	seat vacant		No co-option (both Irish Parliament seats vacant)
1801, 13 February	Clonmel	Rt Hon. William Bagwell	Tory	
1801, 1 January	Coleraine	Walter Jones	Tory	
1801, 1 January	Cork; 2 members	Hon. John Hely-Hutchinson	Whig	Created 1st Baron Hutchinson 1801
1801, 1 January	Cork; 2 members	Mountifort Longfield	Tory	
1802, 8 January	Cork; 2 members	Hon. Christopher Hely-Hutchinson	Whig	
1801, 1 January	County Cork; 2 members	Viscount Boyle		Classified Whig in the 3rd Parliament
1801, 1 January	County Cork; 2 members	Robert Uniacke Fitzgerald		
1801, 1 January	County Donegal; 2 members	Henry Vaughan Brooke	Tory	
1801, 1 January	County Donegal; 2 members	Viscount Sudley	Tory	
1801, 1 January	County Down; 2 members	Viscount Castlereagh	Tory	
1801, 1 January	County Down; 2 members	Francis Savage		
1801, 1 January	Downpatrick	Clotworthy Rowley		Appointed Commissioner of Compensation 1801
1801, 10 March	Downpatrick	Samuel Campbell Rowley		
1801, 1 January	Drogheda	Edward Hardman		
1801, 1 January	Dublin; 2 members	John Claudius Beresford	Tory	
1801, 1 January	Dublin; 2 members	Rt Hon. George Ogle	Tory	
1801, 1 January	County Dublin; 2 members	Hans Hamilton	Tory	
1801, 1 January	County Dublin; 2 members	Frederick John Falkiner	Tory	
1801, 1 January	Dublin University	Hon. George Knox	Tory	
1801, 1 January	Dundalk	seat vacant		No co-option (both Irish Parliament seats vacant)
1801, 28 February	Dundalk	Rt Hon. Isaac Corry	Tory	
1801, 1 January	Dungannon	Hon. John Knox		Died
1801, 21 November	Dungannon	Sir Charles Hamilton, Bt		Classified Tory in the 2nd Parliament
1801, 1 January	Dungarvan	Edward Lee	Whig	
1801, 1 January	Ennis	John Ormsby Vandeleur	Tory	
1801, 1 January	Enniskillen	Hon. Arthur Cole Hamilton	Tory	
1801, 1 January	County Fermanagh; 2 members	Mervyn Archdall (senior)	Tory	
1801, 1 January	County Fermanagh; 2 members	Viscount Cole	Tory	
1801, 1 January	Galway Borough	St. George Daly		Resigned
1801, 10 March	Galway Borough	John Brabazon Ponsonby	Whig	
1801, 1 January	County Galway; 2 members	Richard Le Poer Trench		
1801, 1 January	County Galway; 2 members	Richard Martin		
1801, 1 January	County Kerry; 2 members	James Crosbie	Tory	
1801, 1 January	County Kerry; 2 members	Rt Hon. Maurice Fitzgerald (The 18th Knight of Kerry)	Whig	Appointed Commissioner of the Treasury 1801
1801, 5 March	County Kerry; 2 members	Rt Hon. Maurice Fitzgerald (The 18th Knight of Kerry)	Whig	
1801, 1 January	County Kildare; 2 members	Maurice Keatinge		
1801, 1 January	County Kildare; 2 members	John La Touche	Whig	Not John La Touche, MP elected 1802
1801, 1 January	Kilkenny	William Talbot		Resigned
1802, 2 March	Kilkenny	Richard Archdall		
1801, 1 January	County Kilkenny; 2 members	Hon. James Wandesford Butler	Whig	
1801, 1 January	County Kilkenny; 2 members	Rt Hon. William Brabazon Ponsonby	Whig	
1801, 1 January	King's County; 2 members	Sir Lawrence Parsons, Bt		Classified Tory in the 2nd Parliament
1801, 1 January	King's County; 2 members	Denis Bowes Daly	Tory	
1801, 1 January	Kinsale	William Rowley		Appointed Commissioner of Irish Revenue 1801
1801, 20 February	Kinsale	William Rowley		
1801, 1 January	County Leitrim; 2 members	Viscount Clements	Whig	
1801, 1 January	County Leitrim; 2 members	Rt Hon. Theophilus Jones	Tory	
1801, 1 January	Limerick	Henry Deane Grady		
1801, 1 January	County Limerick; 2 members	John Waller		
1801, 1 January	County Limerick; 2 members	William Odell		Classified Tory in the 4th Parliament
1801, 1 January	Lisburn	George Hatton	Tory	
1801, 1 January	Londonderry	Henry Alexander		
1801, 1 January	County Londonderry; 2 members	Hon. Charles William Stewart	Tory	
1801, 1 January	County Londonderry; 2 members	seat vacant		Beresford became Marquess of Waterford 1800
1801, 14 January	County Londonderry; 2 members	Sir George Fitzgerald Hill, Bt	Tory	
1801, 1 January	County Longford; 2 members	Sir Thomas Fetherston, Bt		Classified Tory in the 3rd Parliament
1801, 1 January	County Longford; 2 members	Sir William Gleadowe-Newcomen, Bt		
1801, 1 January	County Louth; 2 members	John Foster		Classified Tory in the 2nd Parliament
1801, 1 January	County Louth; 2 members	William Charles Fortescue		
1801, 1 January	Mallow	John Longfield		
1801, 1 January	County Mayo; 2 members	Rt Hon. Denis Browne		Classified Tory in the 2nd Parliament
1801, 1 January	County Mayo; 2 members	George Jackson		
1801, 1 January	County Meath; 2 members	Hamilton Gorges		
1801, 1 January	County Meath; 2 members	Sir Marcus Somerville, Bt		Classified Whig in the 2nd Parliament
1801, 1 January	County Monaghan; 2 members	Richard Dawson		
1801, 1 January	County Monaghan; 2 members	Warner William Westenra		Succeeded as 2nd Baron Rossmore on 6 August 1801
1801, 1 December	County Monaghan; 2 members	Charles Powell Leslie II	Tory	
1801, 1 January	New Ross	Robert Leigh		
1801, 1 January	Newry	John Moore		
1801, 1 January	Portarlington	Frederick Trench		Created the 1st Baron Ashtown on 27 December 1800 and never sat, though elected
1801, 5 March	Portarlington	William Elliot		
1801, 1 January	Queen's County; 2 members	Sir John Parnell, Bt		Died 6 December 1801
1801, 1 January	Queen's County; 2 members	Rt Hon. Charles Henry Coote		The 2nd Baron Castle Coote from 1 March 1802
1801, 28 December	Queen's County; 2 members	Hon. William Wellesley-Pole		
1802, 5 April	Queen's County; 2 members	Henry Brooke Parnell		
1801, 1 January	County Roscommon; 2 members	Arthur French	Whig	
1801, 1 January	County Roscommon; 2 members	Thomas Mahon	Whig	
1801, 1 January	Sligo	Owen Wynne	Tory	
1801, 1 January	County Sligo; 2 members	Joshua Edward Cooper	Tory	
1801, 1 January	County Sligo; 2 members	Charles O'Hara	Whig	
1801, 1 January	County Tipperary; 2 members	Viscount Mathew		
1801, 1 January	County Tipperary; 2 members	John Bagwell (c. 1752-1816)		
1801, 1 January	Tralee	Arthur Moore		
1801, 1 January	County Tyrone; 2 members	Viscount Corry		The 2nd Earl Belmore from 2 February 1802
1801, 1 January	County Tyrone; 2 members	James Stewart		
1802, 1 March	County Tyrone; 2 members	Rt Hon. John Stewart		
1801, 1 January	Waterford	William Congreve Alcock	Tory	
1801, 1 January	County Waterford; 2 members	Rt Hon. John Beresford	Tory	
1801, 1 January	County Waterford; 2 members	Richard Power	Whig	
1801, 1 January	County Westmeath; 2 members	William Smyth		
1801, 1 January	County Westmeath; 2 members	Gustavus Hume-Rochfort		Classified Tory in the 5th Parliament
1801, 1 January	Wexford	Francis Leigh		Resigned
1801, 20 February	Wexford	Ponsonby Tottenham		
1801, 1 January	County Wexford; 2 members	Viscount Loftus	Tory	
1801, 1 January	County Wexford; 2 members	Abel Ram	Tory	
1801, 1 January	County Wicklow; 2 members	William Hoare Hume	Whig	
1801, 1 January	County Wicklow; 2 members	seat vacant		Death of Westby on 30 November 1800
1801, February	County Wicklow; 2 members	George Ponsonby	Whig	First contested UK election, in Ireland
1801, 1 January	Youghal	Sir John Keane, Bt	Tory	Created baronet 1 August 1801

== See also ==
- Duration of English, British and United Kingdom parliaments from 1660
- List of parliaments of the United Kingdom
- List of United Kingdom by-elections (1801–1806)
- First Parliament of the United Kingdom
