= Francis Mathew =

Francis Mathew may refer to:

- Francis Mathew, 1st Earl Landaff, Anglo-Irish politician and peer
- Francis Mathew, 2nd Earl Landaff, Irish peer and politician

== See also ==
- Matthew Francis (disambiguation)
- Francis Matthews (disambiguation)
