= Prittie =

Prittie is a surname, and may refer to:

- Bob Prittie (1919–2002), Canadian politician
- Francis Aldborough Prittie (1779–1853), Irish politician
- Henry Prittie, 1st Baron Dunalley (1743–1801), Irish peer and Member of Parliament
- Henry Prittie, 2nd Baron Dunalley (1775–1854), Anglo-Irish politician and peer
- Henry Prittie, 4th Baron Dunalley (1851–1927), Anglo-Irish peer
