= Henry Prittie =

Henry Prittie may refer to:

- Henry Prittie, 1st Baron Dunalley (1743–1801), Irish peer and member of parliament
- Henry Prittie, 2nd Baron Dunalley (1775–1854), Anglo-Irish politician
- Henry Prittie, 4th Baron Dunalley (1851–1927), Anglo-Irish peer
