= Landaff =

Landaff may refer to:

- Landaff, New Hampshire, a town in Grafton County
- Landaff Andrews (1803–1888), United States Representative from Kentucky
- Earl Landaff, a title in the Peerage of Ireland
  - Francis Mathew, 1st Earl Landaff (1738–1806)
  - Francis Mathew, 2nd Earl Landaff (1768–1833)

== See also ==
- Landulf, a masculine given name
- Llandaff, a district, community and electoral ward in Cardiff, Wales, United Kingdom
