= Daniel Toler =

Irish Member of Parliament

Daniel Toler (26 June 1739 – 27 June 1796) was an Irish Member of Parliament.

== Early life ==
Toler was born on 26 June 1739. He was the eldest son of Daniel Toler (d. c. 1755) and Letitia (née Otway) Toler (d. 1794). Among his siblings was younger brother, John Toler, 1st Earl of Norbury, the Chief Justice of the Irish Common Pleas who was considered to be one of the most corrupt legal figures in Irish history.

His paternal grandfather was Nicholas Toler. The Toler family was originally from Norfolk, but settled in Ireland in the 17th century during the reign of Charles I, when an ancestor who was a successful soldier in Cronwell's army obtained a grant of lands in County Tipperary and settled at Beechwood. His maternal grandfather was Thomas Otway, of Castle Otway.

He was educated at Trinity College, Dublin.

== Career ==
He represented County Tipperary from 1776 to 1790, alongside Henry Prittie (later 1st Baron Dunalley), Hon. Francis James Mathew (later 2nd Earl Landaff), and John Bagwell. Toler was appointed High Sheriff of Tipperary in 1770.

== Personal life ==
In November 1760, Toler was married to Rebecca Minchin, daughter of Paul Minchin (a son of Humphrey Minchin, MP for County Tipperary) and Henrietta (née Bunbury) Minchin (the daughter of Joseph Bunbury). Together, they were the parents of:

- Harriet Toler (b. c. 1763), who married Sir Henry Osborne, 11th Baronet, son of Sir William Osborne, 8th Baronet and Elizabeth Christmas (a daughter of Thomas Christmas, MP).
- Sarah Toler (b. 1766), who married Robert Curtis, the son of Rev. Robert Curtis, in 1786.
- Daniel Minchin Toler (1768–1795), the High Sheriff of Tipperary in 1794; he died unmarried.
- Eliza Toler (b. 1768), who married Thomas Taylor in 1798.

Toler died on 27 June 1796 at Beechwood, Nenagh, County Tipperary, Ireland. His widow died in September 1800. As he was predeceased by his son, his daughters were his co-heiresses.

=== Descendants ===
Through his daughter Harriet, he was a grandfather of Eliza Osborne (d. 1853), who married Thomas Gibbon Fitzgibbon; Harriet Osborne (d. 1865), who married Dr. Jean Costy of Luc-sur-Mer, Normandy; and Sir Daniel Toler Osborne, 12th Baronet (1783–1853), who married Lady Harriet Le Poer Trench, daughter of William Trench, 1st Earl of Clancarty.

Parliament of Ireland
Preceded by Francis Mathew; Henry Prittie	Member of Parliament for County Tipperary; 1776–1790; With: Henry Prittie 1783–1790; Hon. Francis James Mathew 1790–1792; John Bagwell 1792–1796	Succeeded by Hon. Francis James Mathew; John Bagwell
