= Lord Lieutenant of Tipperary =

List of Lord Lieutenants of Tipperary

This is a list of people who have served as Lord Lieutenant of County Tipperary between 1831 and 1922.

There were lieutenants of counties in Ireland until the reign of James II, when they were renamed governors. The office of Lord Lieutenant was recreated on 23 August 1831.

== Governors ==
- James Butler, 2nd Duke of Ormond (attainted 1715)
- Richard Pennefather: 1746–1777 (died 1777)
- Richard Pennefather: 1777–1831 (died 1831)
- Francis Mathew, 1st Earl Landaff: 1777–1800 (died 1806)
- Cornwallis Maude, 1st Viscount Hawarden: –1803 (died 1803)
- Cornelius O'Callaghan, 1st Baron Lismore: –1797 (died 1797)
- John Bagwell: 1792–1816 (died 1816)
- Stephen Moore:
- Richard Hely-Hutchinson, 1st Earl of Donoughmore: –1825 (died 1825)
- William Bagwell: 1807–1826 (died 1826)
- Richard Butler, 2nd Earl of Glengall: 1829 –1831

== Lord Lieutenants ==
- John Hely-Hutchinson, 2nd Earl of Donoughmore, 17 October 1831 – 29 June 1832
- John Hely-Hutchinson, 3rd Earl of Donoughmore, 14 August 1832 – 14 September 1851
- Cornelius O'Callaghan, 1st Viscount Lismore, 20 October 1851 – 30 May 1857
- George O'Callaghan, 2nd Viscount Lismore, 24 June 1857 – 1885
- Cornwallis Maude, 1st Earl de Montalt, 1885 – 9 January 1905
- Henry Prittie, 4th Baron Dunalley, 15 May 1905 – 1922
