= Montague James Mathew =

Anglo-Irish soldier and politician

Lieutenant-General Montague James Mathew MP
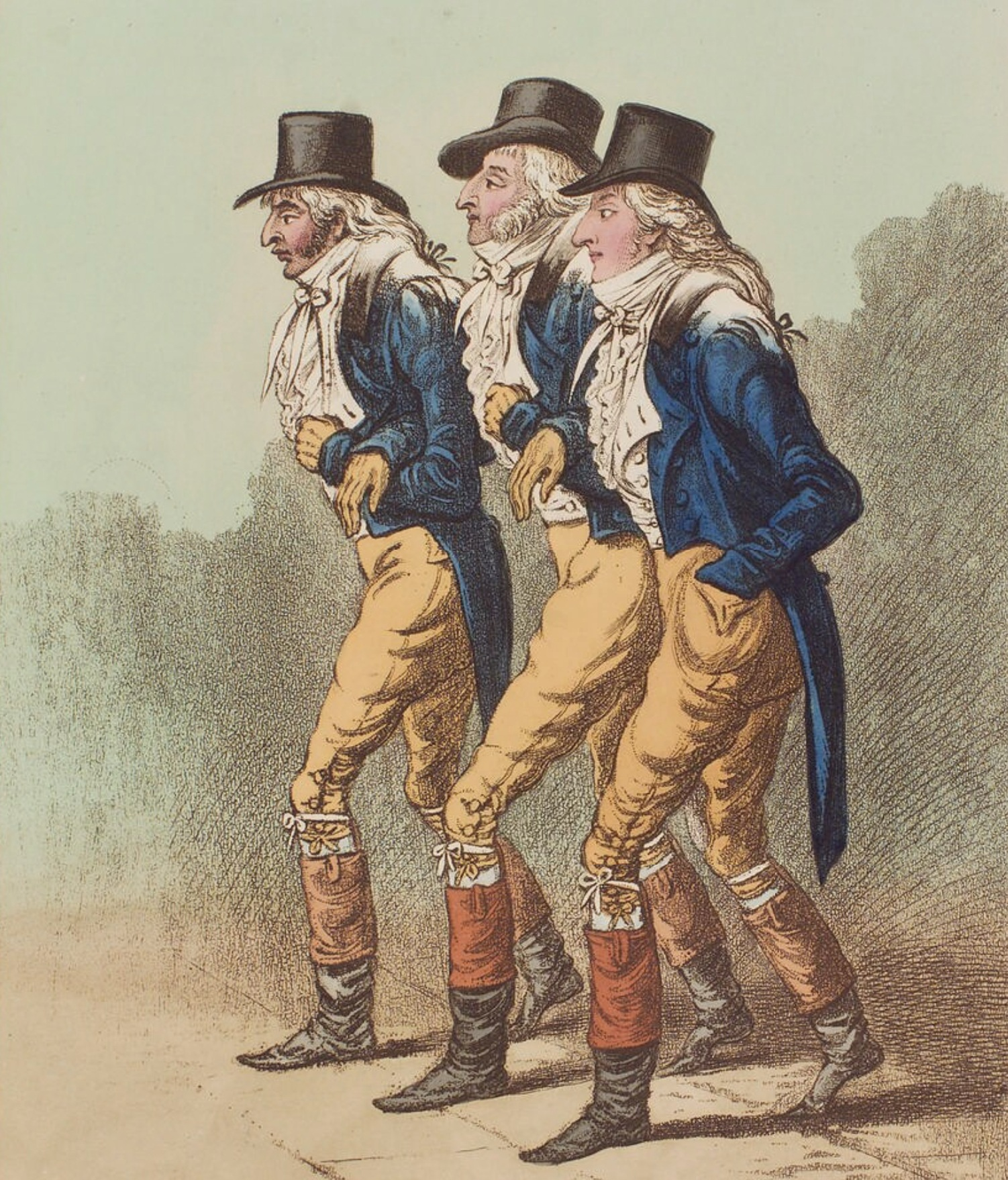
- 1803 portrait of Mathew (left)
- Born: 18 August 1773; Thomastown Castle, County Tipperary
- Died: 19 March 1819 (aged 45); Castle Fogerty, Thurles, County Tipperary
- Military career
- Allegiance: Great Britain (1773–1800); United Kingdom (1801–1819)
- Branch: British Army
- Rank: Lieutenant-general
- Commands: 99th Foot

Lieutenant-General Montague James Mathew (18 August 1773 – 19 March 1819) was a British Army officer and politician who was a member of the Irish House of Commons for Ballynakill until 1800 and of the House of Commons of the United Kingdom for County Tipperary from 1806 until his death in 1819. In politics, he was both a Whig and a supporter of Catholic emancipation and other Roman Catholic causes, which brought him into conflict with many members of his class in Ireland.

== Life ==
Mathew was the second son of Francis Mathew, 1st Earl Landaff. He was commissioned into the British Army as a cornet in 1792, became a lieutenant in 1793, and on 13 September 1794 was promoted lieutenant-colonel in the 114th Foot, a new regiment raised that year by his father. He was further promoted colonel in 1800, major general on 25 April 1808, and lieutenant general on 4 June 1813.

From 1797 to 1800, Mathew was a member of the Irish House of Commons for Ballynakill in what was then Queen's County, succeeding Eyre Coote.

In 1806, Mathew was proposed as a member of Dublin's Kildare Street Club but was blackballed by no fewer than eighty-five members, so was rejected. His brother Francis Mathew, 2nd Earl Landaff, denounced the "eighty-five scoundrels", who he claimed had all promised him they would give his brother their support, and stalked out of the club, never to return.

Mathew was first elected as a Member of the House of Commons of the United Kingdom for County Tipperary in November 1806, succeeding his brother Francis when he became an Irish representative peer in the House of Lords, and held the seat until his death in 1819. In politics, he was a Whig. On 22 January 1808, the Tory Sir Arthur Wellesley, Chief Secretary for Ireland, wrote to the Duke of Richmond:

The Parlt. met yesterday... a drunken speech from Sheridan towards morning, and a blackguard one from Montague Mathew, who, with the figure of an Irish giant and the voice of a stentor, charged Perceval with treason to 5 millions of Irish Catholics & me with corruption at the County Tipperary election....

On 5 May 1808, Mathew urged Wellesley and Perceval's government to increase its financial support for St Patrick's College, Maynooth, reminding them of a recent offer made by order of Napoleon Bonaparte to encourage Irish students to go from Lisbon to France for their education and promising them financial assistance.

In 1809, the magazine Select reviews reported that

There are two members in the house of commons, named Montagu Mathew, and Mathew Montagu; the former a tall handsome man; and the latter a little man. During the present session of parliament, the speaker, having addressed the latter as the former, Montagu Mathew observed, it was strange he should make such a mistake, as there was as great a difference between them as between a horse chesnut and a chesnut horse.

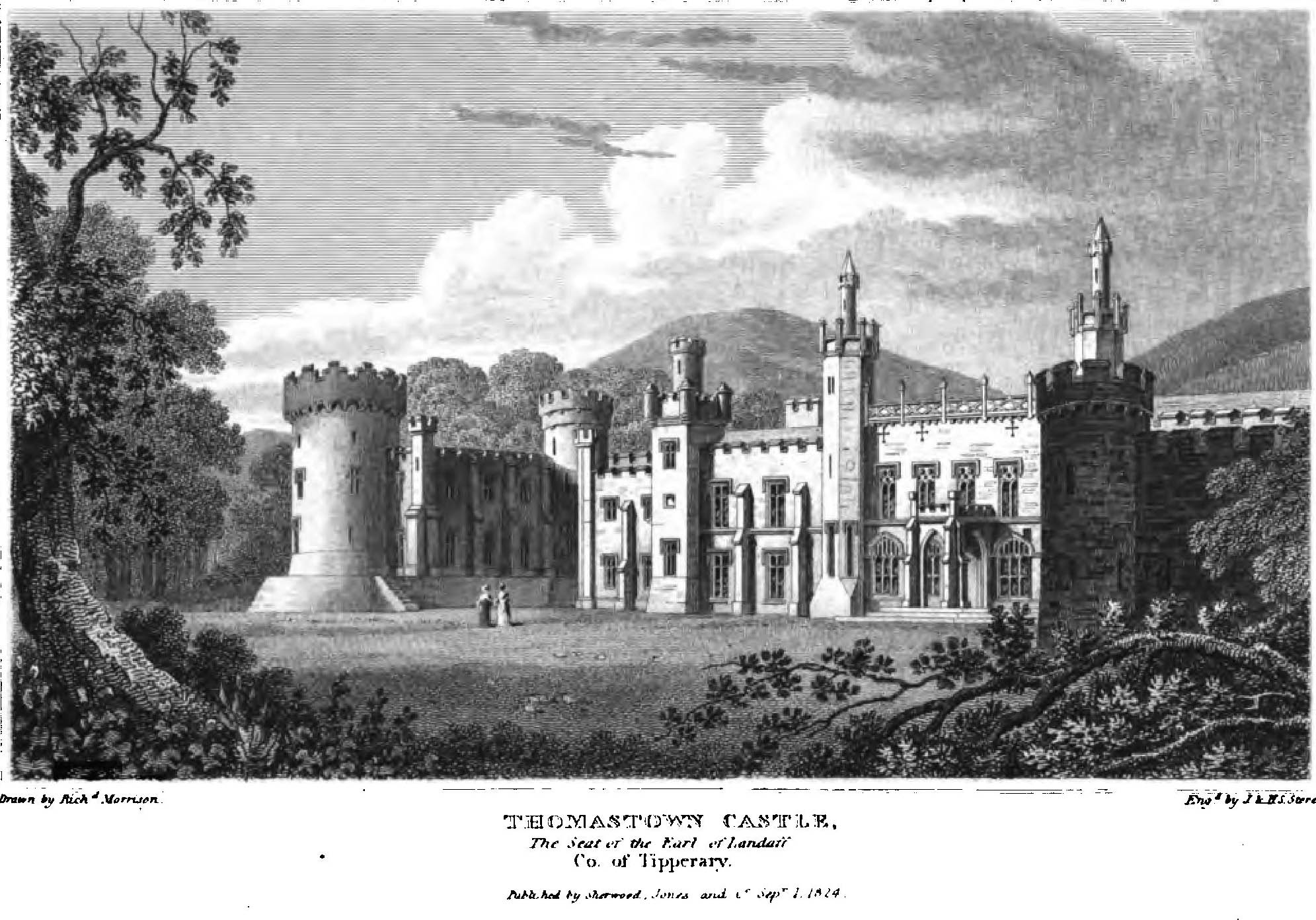
Thomastown Castle, Mathew's family seat

On 6 June 1811 Mathew was appointed Colonel of the 99th Foot.

In 1815 the parliamentary sketch-writer Thomas Barnes wrote of Mathew that he showed "...all the characteristic fervour of his countrymen in favour of the cause of the Catholics, but at the same time evinces a blindness of blundering greater than even foolish illiberality ever ascribed to his nation".

Mathew never married. He died suddenly, and intestate, at Castle Fogerty, Thurles, County Tipperary, on 19 March 1819. He was buried at his ancestral home, Thomastown in the parish of Kilfeacle. Of his death it was later recorded that he was "one of the last of the four-bottle men in the county", and that he had died at dinner.

A distant relation noted in 1890:

They were popular among their tenants – as were most kindly spendthrifts – but were by no means model landlords. One of them, a General Montagu Mathew, is still remembered in Tipperary with special affection. Their crest was quarrelsome – a fighting heathcock, most pugnacious of fowl, with the motto, Y Fyn duw a Fydd, or the word "Towton", traced to Sir David Mathew, the Yorkist standard-bearer at Towton Field. The ingenious Burke, in his "Landed Gentry," traces this family back to Gwaithvoed the Great, Prince of Cardigan and Gwent...

== Notes ==
Parliament of the United Kingdom
Preceded by Francis, Viscount Mathew; John Bagwell	Member of Parliament for County Tipperary; 1806 – 1819; With: Francis Aldborough Prittie to 1818; Richard Butler, Viscount Caher 1818–19; William Bagwell 1819	Succeeded by William Bagwell; Francis Aldborough Prittie
