= Frank Matthews =

Frank Mat(t)hews may refer to:

- Frank Matthews (footballer) (1902–1981), English footballer
- Frank Matthews (drug trafficker) (born 1940), drug trafficker
- Frank C. Matthews (born 1972), African-American writer of urban fiction
- Frank Matthews (Tracy Beaker)
- Frank Matthews, character in 31 North 62 East
- Frank A. Mathews Jr. (1890–1964), American Republican Party politician from New Jersey
- Frank Matthews (cricketer) (1892–1961), English cricketer

== See also ==
- Francis Matthews (disambiguation)
