= Baron Dunalley =

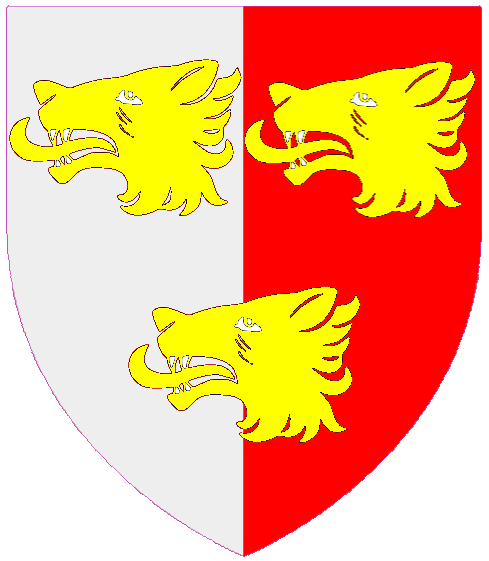
- Crest: A wolf's head erased Or.
- Shield: Per pale Argent and Gules three wolves' heads erased Or.
- Supporters: Dexter a man in armour Proper holding a tilting spear in the right hand. Sinister a stag Proper attired unguled collared and chained Or.
- Motto: In Omnia Paratus (Prepared For All Things)

Baron Dunalley, of Kilboy in the County of Tipperary, is a title in the Peerage of Ireland. It was created on 31 July 1800 for Henry Prittie, who had previously represented Banagher, Gowran and County Tipperary in the Irish House of Commons. His son, the second Baron, represented Carlow in the Irish Parliament and Okehampton in the British House of Commons and also sat in the House of Lords as an Irish representative peer from 1828 to 1854. He was succeeded by his nephew, the third Baron. When he died the barony was inherited by his son, the fourth Baron. He was an Irish Representative Peer between 1891 and 1927 and served as Lord Lieutenant of County Tipperary. As of 2014 the title is held by his great-grandson, the seventh Baron, who succeeded his father in 1992.

The family house was Kilboy House, near Nenagh, County Tipperary, which was built in 1771 to the design of William Leeson Architect. The house was torched by the IRA on 8 August 1922. A compensation claim was made to the new Irish Government, but the payment which they made was not sufficient to return the house to its former glory.

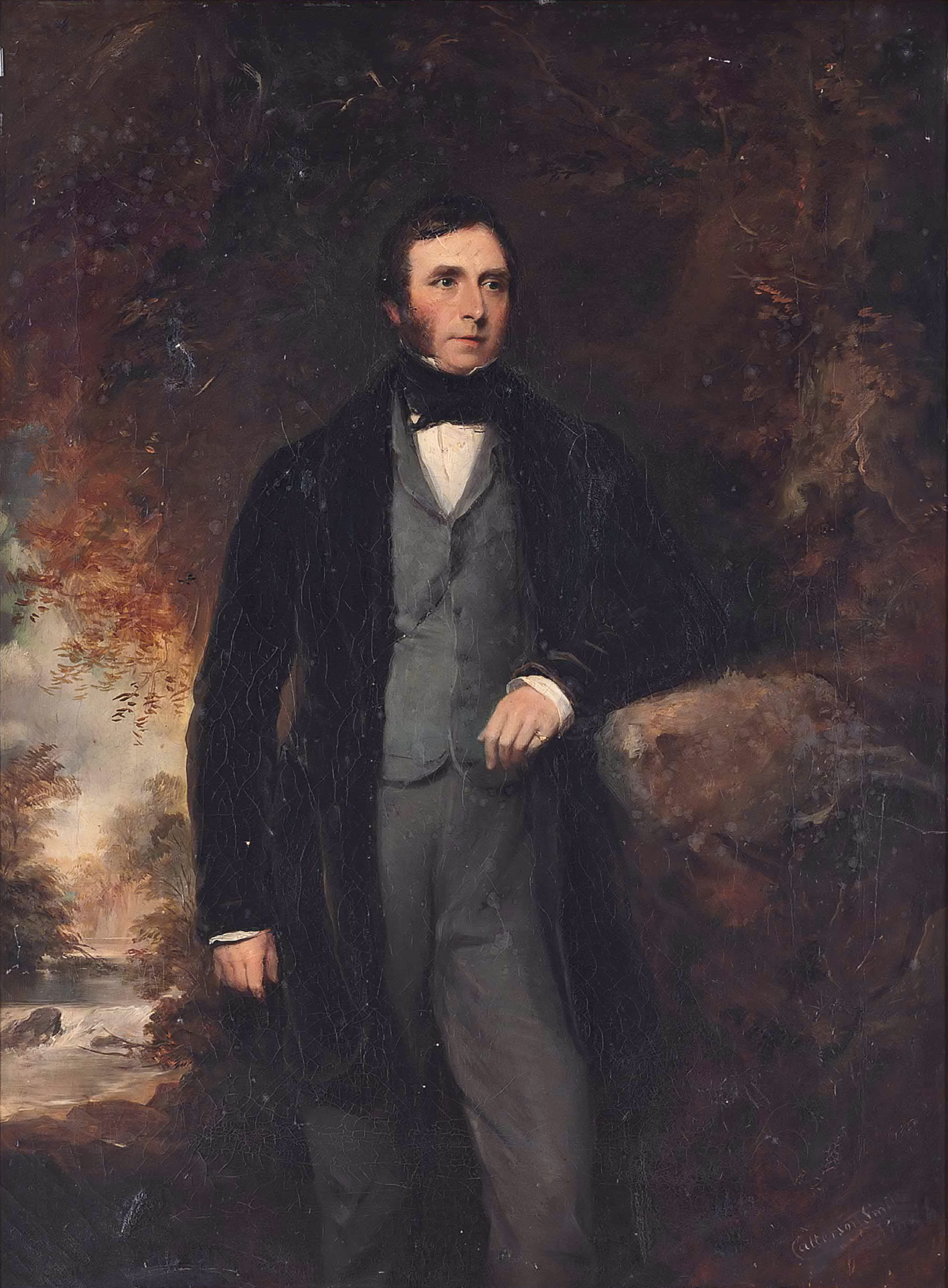
Henry Prittie, 3rd Baron Dunalley (1807–1885) (Stephen Catterson Smith, 1851)

== Barons Dunalley (1800) ==
- Henry Prittie, 1st Baron Dunalley (1743–1801)
- Henry Sadlier Prittie, 2nd Baron Dunalley (1775–1854)
- Henry Prittie, 3rd Baron Dunalley (1807–1885)
- Henry O'Callaghan Prittie, 4th Baron Dunalley (1851–1927)
- Henry Cornelius O'Callaghan Prittie, 5th Baron Dunalley (1877–1948)
- Henry Desmond Graham Prittie, 6th Baron Dunalley (1912–1992)
- Henry Francis Cornelius Prittie, 7th Baron Dunalley (born 1948)

The heir apparent is the present holder's son Hon. Joel Henry Prittie (born 1981).
