= Custos Rotulorum of Tipperary =

The Custos Rotulorum of County Tipperary was the highest civil officer in County Tipperary. The position was later combined with that of Lord Lieutenant of Tipperary.

== Incumbents ==
- c.1694–1704 Standish Hartstonge
- 1769–1806 Francis Mathew, 1st Earl Landaff
- 1807–1853 Francis Aldborough Prittie

For later custodes rotulorum, see Lord Lieutenant of Tipperary
