= High Sheriff of Tipperary =

The High Sheriff of Tipperary was the Sovereign's judicial representative in County Tipperary. Initially an office for a lifetime, assigned by the Sovereign, the High Sheriff became annually appointed from the Provisions of Oxford in 1258. Besides his judicial importance, he had ceremonial and administrative functions and executed High Court Writs.

== History ==
The first (High) Shrievalties were established before the Norman Conquest in 1066 and date back to Saxon times. In 1908, an Order in Council made the Lord-Lieutenant the Sovereign's prime representative in a county and reduced the High Sheriff's precedence. Despite however that the office retained his responsibilities for the preservation of law and order in a county.

County Tipperary was a liberty administered by the Earls of Ormond, who thereby appointed the Sheriff, until it was extinguished as part of the second Duke's attainder for supporting the Jacobite rising of 1715. It then became a normal county under the direct control of the King.

In Tipperary and in four of the counties of the province of Connaught the office ceased to exist with the establishment of the Irish Free State in 1922.

== High Sheriffs of Tipperary ==
- 1295: Walter Brett/le Bret
- 1318: John Pembroke
- 1405: James Butler
- 1605: Hon Thomas Butler
- 1610: Piers Butler fitzJames of Lismalin
- 1612: William St John of Skaddanston
- 1613: Thomas Cantwell
- 1614: Richard Butler of Knocktopher
- 1615: William O'Meary of Lisenoskey
- 1616: Daniel O'Bryen
- 1618: Gilbert Butler
- 1619: Robert Carew
- 1620: William St John
- 1625: William O'Meara

== English Interregnum, 1649–1660 ==
- 1657: Richard le Hunte of Cashel
- 1658: Sir Thomas Stanley
- 1659: Henry Prittie

== Charles II, 1660–1685 ==
- 1660:
- 1666: Thomas Sadleir of Sopwell hall
- 1672: Eliah Greene
- 1673:
- 1674: John Pyke or Pike
- 1675: Richard Moore of Clonmel
- 1676:
- 1684:

== James II, 1685–1689 ==
- 1686: Anthony Maude
- 1687: Isaac Walden

== William III, 1689–1702 ==
- 1689:
- 1695:
- 1696: Humphrey Minchin of Ballinakill
- 1697:
- 1698: Thomas Moore of Chancellorstown
- 1701:

== Anne, 1702–1714 ==
- 1702:
- 1703: Kingsmill Pennefather of New Park
- 1707:
- 1708: Kingsmill Pennefather of New Park (2nd term)
- 1709: Sir William Parsons, 2nd Bt
- 1712: Matthew Pennefather
- 1713:
- Thomas Armstrong of Mealiffe

== George I, 1714–1727 ==
- 1714:
- 1717: John Carleton of Darling Hill
- 1719: Kilner Brasier
- 1720:
- 1721:
- 1722: Guy Moore of Abbey
- 1723:
- 1724: Richard Pennefather
- 1725:
- 1726: William Baker of Lismacue

== George II, 1727–1760 ==
- 1727:
- 1729: Robert Marshall
- 1731: Lovelace Taylor of Noan and Ballinure
- 1732:
- 1733: John Minchin of Annagh
- 1736: Paul Minchin of Balinakill
- 1738: William Armstrong of Farney Castle and Mount Heaton
- 1741: Sir Thomas Dancer, 4th Bt
- 1743:
- 1744: Richard Moore of Barne House, Clonmel
- 1745:
- 1750: Kingsmill Pennefather
- 1753: John Bloomfield of Redwood
- 1757: Stephen Moore
- 1758:
- 1759: John Bayly of Debsborough

== George III, 1760–1820 ==
- 1760:
- 1764: William Barker
- 1765: Sir Thomas Maude, 2nd Bt
- 1766: Daniel Toler
- 1768: Anthony Parker of Castle Lough
- 1770: Henry Prittie
- 1772: Peter Holmes of Peterfield
- 1777: Richard Biggs of Castle Biggs
- 1778:
- 1779: Mark Lidwill of Clonmore, Cormackstown and Annfield
- 1780:
- 1781: Robert Nicholson of Wilmar
- 1782: Richard Butler Hamilton Lowe of Lowe's Green
- 1783: James Ffogerty of Castle ffogerty
- 1784: Richard or Stephen Moore of Chancellor's Town
- 1785: Thomas Barton of Grove
- 1786: Stephen Moore
- 1789: Daniel Mansergh of Cashel
- 1790:
- 1793: John Bagwell
- 1794: Daniel Minchin Toler
- 1795: Peter Holmes of Peterfield
- 1797: John Carden
- 1798: Sir Thomas Judkin-FitzGerald, 1st Bt
- 1803: Thomas Going
- 1804: Henry Osborne
- 1805: William Hutchinson
- 1806: George Lidwill of Dromard
- 1807: John Poe
- 1808: Henry Langley
- 1809: John Southcote Mansergh of Grenane
- 1810: Dunbar Barton of Rochestown
- 1811: Benjamin Bagwell
- 1812: Thomas Prendergast
- 1813: William Quinn
- 1814: Fergus Langley
- 1815: Richard Creagh
- 1816: Pierce Archer Butler
- 1817: Vere Dawson Hunt
- 1818: Nathaniel Taylor of Noan
- 1819: Kingsmill Pennefather † / succeeded by Sir John Judkin-Fitzgerald, 2nd Bt

== George IV, 1820–1830 ==
- 1820: Sir Arthur Carden, 2nd Bt
- 1821: Chambre Brabazon Barker
- 1822: John Hely Hutchinson
- 1823: Sir Robert William O'Callaghan
- 1824: Sir Henry Robert Carden, 3rd Bt
- 1825: William Barton of Grove, Fethard, Tipperary
- 1826: Mathew Pennefather of New Park
- 1827: Hon. George O'Callaghan
- 1828: William Perry of Woodrooff
- 1829: Matthew Jacob

== William IV, 1830–1837 ==
- 1830: John Trant
- 1831:
- 1832: Stephen Moore
- 1833:
- 1834: John Bagwell of Marlfield
- 1835:
- 1836: Maurice Crosbie Moore of Mooresfoot

== Victoria, 1837–1901 ==
- 1837:
- 1838: Hon. Francis Aldborough Prittie
- 1840: Henry Sadleir Prittie
- 1841: Thomas Edmund Lalor
- 1842: Richard Wilis Gason of Richmond
- 1843:
- 1844:
- 1845: John Bayley
- 1846: John Trant of Dovea
- 1847: Richard Hely-Hutchinson, 4th Earl of Donoughmore
- 1848: Richard Pennefather of Knockevan, Clonmel
- 1849: Sir John Cravan Carden, 4th Bt of the Priory
- 1850: Lieutenant-Colonel Wray Palliser of Derryluskan
- 1851: George Ryan
- 1852: Sir Thomas Bernard Going Dancer, 6th Bt
- 1853:
- 1855: Thomas Butler-Stoney of Portland Park
- 1856: Edward Bagwell Purefoy of Greenfield
- 1857: Edmond James Power-Lalor of Long Orchard
- 1858: Honourable George Stephens Gough of Rathronan, Clonmel
- 1859: Thomas Sadleir of Castletown and Ballinderry
- 1860: Thomas Lalor of Cregg
- 1861: Sir William Osborne, 13th Baronet, Beechwood
- 1862: Charles Clarke of Graiguenoe Park
- 1864: Hon. Bowes Daly
- 1864: James Lenigan
- 1865: Robert St John Cole Bowen of Bowen's Court
- 1866:
- 1867: Stephen Charles Moore of Barne
- 1868: Laurence Waldrov Waldron of Helen Park
- 1869: Richard Bagwell of Marlfield
- 1870: Vincent Scully of Mantle Hill
- 1871: Francis Wise Low of Kilshane
- 1872: William Bassett Holmes of St David's
- 1873: Andrew Carden
- 1873: James Fogarty of Castle Fogarty
- 1874: John Bayly of Debsborough
- 1875: James Scully of Shanballymore
- 1876: Anthony Parker
- 1877: Arthur John Moore of Mooresfort
- 1878: George Edward Ryan of Inch
- 1879: William Gibson
- 1880: Thomas Butler of Ballycarron
- 1881: Henry Jesse Lloyd of Lloydsborough
- 1882: Sir John Craven Carden, 5th Bt.
- 1883: Hon. Henry O'Callaghan Prittie
- 1884: Benjamin Frend Going
- 1885: Stephen Moore of Barne
- 1886: Hon. Cosby Godolphin Trench of Sopwell Hall.
- 1887: John Vivian Ryan-Lenigan of Castle fogerty
- 1888: Andrew Murray Carden of Barnane
- 1889: FitzGibbon Trant
- 1890:
- 1891: Charles Neville Clarke of Graiguenoe Park
- 1891: William Bassett Traherne Holmes of St David's
- 1892: James Netterville Atkinson of Ashley Park
- 1893: Austin Samuel Cooper
- 1894: John Bayly of Debsborough
- 1895: William Arthur Riall of Annerville
- 1896: Robert George Edward Twiss of Birdhill House
- 1897: Louis Henry Grubb
- 1898: Evelyn Fortescue Lloyd of Cranagh Castle
- 1899: William Godfrey Dunham Massy
- 1900: Edward Henry Saunders of Kilavalla

== Edward VII, 1901–1910 ==
- 1901: Charles Edward Tuthill
- 1902: Samuel Phillips of Gaile
- 1903: Richard Henry FitzRichard Falkiner
- 1904: Randal Kingsmill Moore of Barne
- 1905: Marcus Beresford Armstrong of Mealiffe
- 1906: Frederick Rhodes Armitage
- 1907: Walter Charles Butler-Stoney of Portland Park
- 1908: Standish Grady John Parker-Hutchinson of Timoney Park and Castle Lough, Tipperary
- 1909: Solomon Watson of Ballingarrane
- 1910: Charles Caleb Coote Webb of Kilmore, Nenagh

== George V, 1910–1922 ==
- 1911: Robert Joseph Cooke
- 1912: Hardress Gilbert Holmes
- 1913: Francis Simon Low
- 1914: Cavendish Walter Gartside-Tipping
- 1915: Charles Mayne Going
- 1916: Samuel Richard Grubb
- 1917: Darby Scully
- 1918: George Richard Cooke
- 1919: Richard Butler
- 1922:

== Notes ==
† Died in office
