= Jefferys Allen =

English politician

Jefferys Allen (1760 – 23 August 1844) was a British politician and the Member of Parliament for Bridgwater from 1796 to 1804.

== See also ==
- List of MPs in the first United Kingdom Parliament
