= Earl Landaff =

Extinct title in the peerage of Ireland

Earldom of Landaff
- Arms: Or, a Lion rampant Sable. Crest: On a Mount Vert, a Moorcock proper. Supporters: On either side a Unicorn Argent, armed maned tufted hoofed plain collared and chained Or.
- Creation date: 22 November 1797
- Created by: King George III
- Peerage: Peerage of Ireland
- First holder: Francis Mathew, 1st Viscount Landaff
- Last holder: Francis Mathew, 2nd Earl Landaff
- Remainder to: The 1st Earls’s heirs male of the body lawfully begotten
- Subsidiary titles: Viscount Landaff; Baron Landaff
- Status: Extinct
- Extinction date: 12 March 1833
- Former seat: Thomastown Castle
- Motto: A FYNNO DUW A FYDD (What God wills will be)

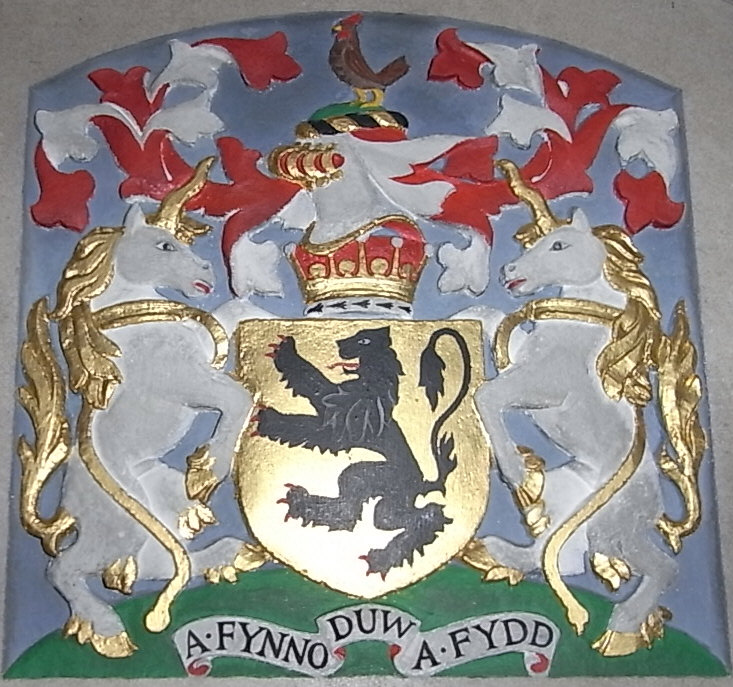
Arms of Mathew, Earls Landaff, in Landaff Cathederal

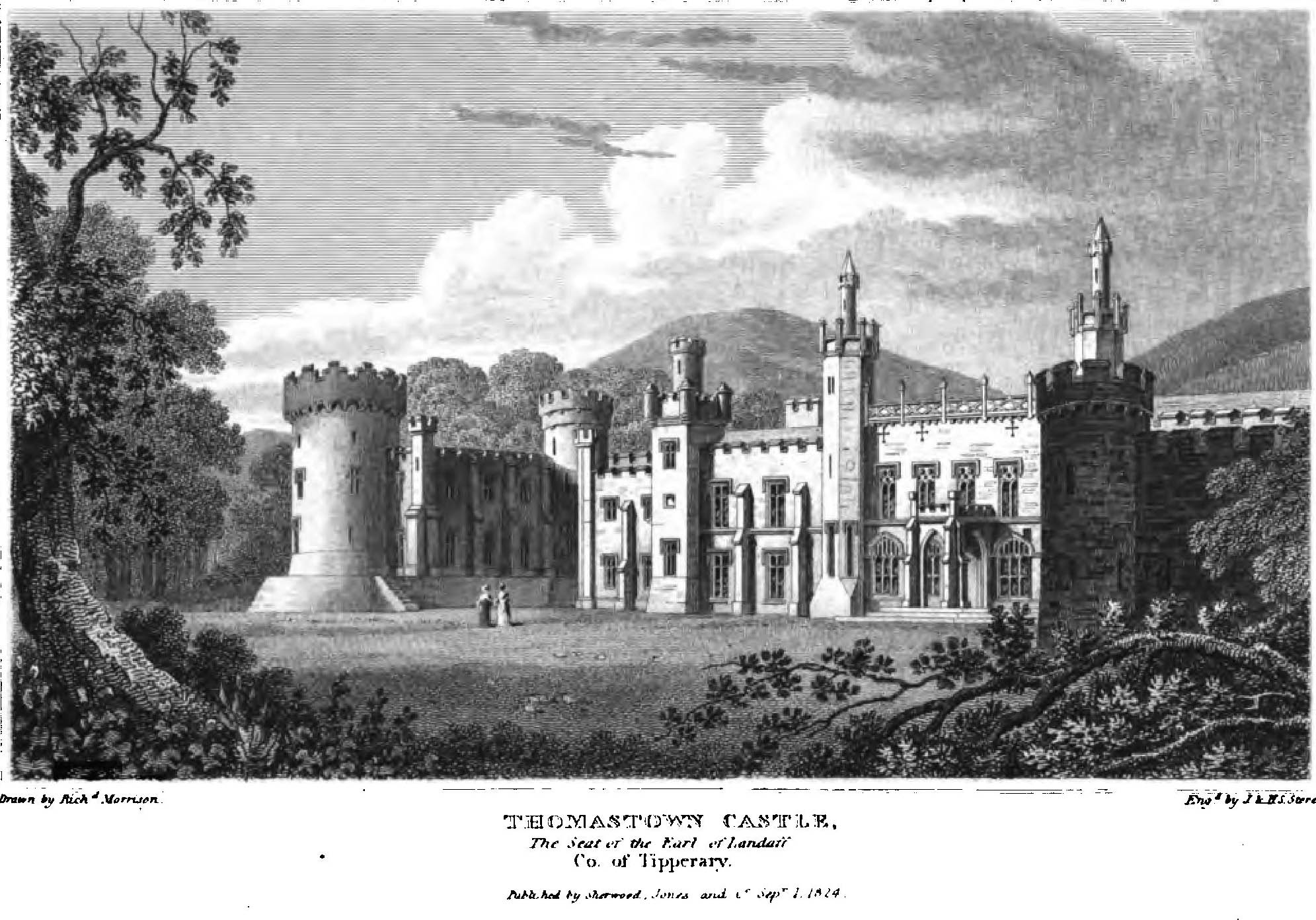
Thomastown Castle, County Tipperary, the seat of the Earls Landaff, 1824.

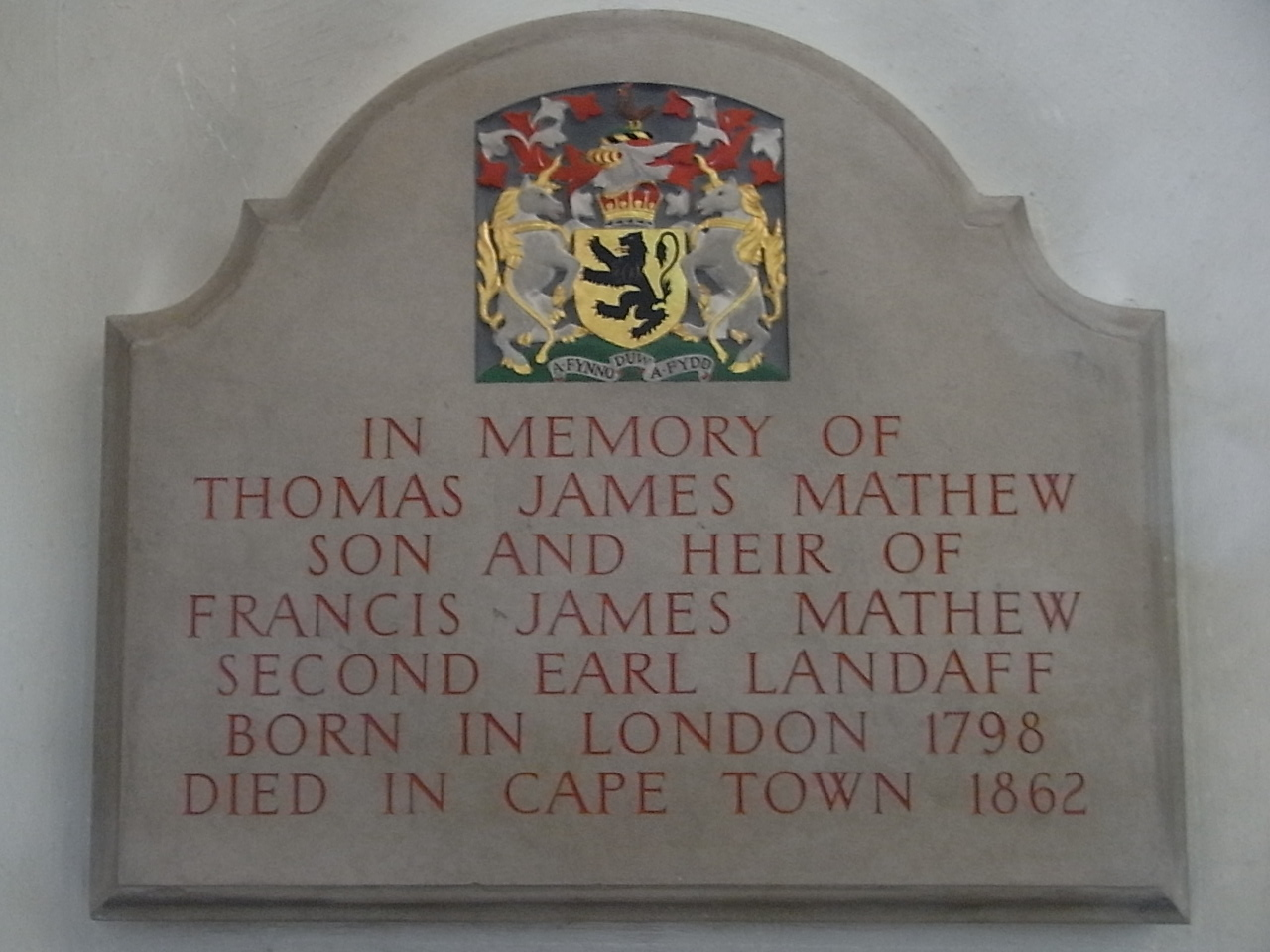
Mural memorial tablet erected 1987 in Llandaff Cathedral: "In memory of Thomas James Mathew son and heir of Francis James Mathew second Earl of Landaff born in London 1798 died in Cape Town 1862". The arms are blasoned: Or, a lion rampant sable. Crest: A heathcock proper. Supporters: Two unicorns rampant silver maned tufted hooved collared and chained or. Motto: A Fynno Duw a Fydd ("What God wills will be")

Earl Landaff, of Thomastown in the County of Tipperary, was a title in the Peerage of Ireland. It was created in 1797 for Francis Mathew, 1st Viscount Landaff, who had previously represented County Tipperary in the Irish House of Commons. He had already been created Baron Landaff, of Thomastown in the County of Tipperary, in 1783, and Viscount Landaff, of Thomastown in the County of Tipperary, in 1793, also in the Peerage of Ireland. In 1800 he was elected as one of the 28 original Irish representative peers. He was succeeded by his son, the second Earl. The titles became extinct on his death in 1833. Thomastown Castle was the childhood home of Father Theobald Mathew, "The Apostle of Temperance".

The Earls Landaff used the invented courtesy title Viscount Mathew for the heir apparent. Despite their territorial designations and the fact that they were in the Peerage of Ireland, the titles all referred to the place in Glamorgan now spelt Llandaff. The Mathew family was founded by Sir David Mathew (died 1484), Grand Standard Bearer of England. The Earls Landaff were descended from the branch of the family seated at Radyr, Glamorgan, Wales, descended from Thomas Mathew (died 1470), a younger son of Sir David Mathew. In Llandaff Cathedral, nearby Radyr, there exist three 15th-century and 16th-century Mathew family effigies.

The seat of the Mathew family was Thomastown Castle, County Tipperary long abandoned. The extant ruins form a notable landmark. George Mathew sold his estate at Radyr and moved to Thomastown, gaining ownership of the castle through marriage to Elizabeth Poyntz after the death of her first husband, Thomas Butler, Viscount Thurles, of the Butler family.

== Earls Landaff (1797) ==
- Francis Mathew, 1st Earl Landaff (1738–1806)
- Francis James Mathew, 2nd Earl Landaff (1768–1833)

Rejected claimants

- Arnold Harris Mathew, self-styled de jure 4th Earl Landaff, (Note: Arnold Harris Mathew (AHM) claimed that his great-grandfather was Francis Mathew, 1st Earl Landaff. AHM put forward his claim to the Garter Principal King of Arms for the title of 4th Earl of Llandaff of Thomastown, County Tipperary in 1890. AHM just had a pedigree placed on official record at the College of Arms. He did not intend to "definitely determine in the customary method his right to the dignity he claim[ed]" by establishing his right to vote at the elections of Irish representative peers. He has been advised that all he could hope to obtain would be the barren title. John H. Matthews, Cardiff archivist, said in 1898 that the number of claimants to the dormant earldom "is legion". In the archivist's opinion, AHM's published pedigree was "too extra-ordinary to commend itself to an impartial mind." The next year AHM changed his mind. In 1899, his petition to the House of Lords, claiming a right to vote, was read and referred to the Lord Chancellor. In his petition, he wrote that Eliza Francesca Povoleri was a spinster and he did not claim she was the daughter of a Marchese and a Contessa. In 1902, the Lord Chancellor, Hardinge Giffard, 1st Earl of Halsbury, reported that AHM's claim "is of such a nature that it ought to be referred to the Committee for Privileges; read, and ordered to lie on the Table.") also self-styled Count Povoleri di Vicenza (1852–1919).
  He was founder and first bishop of the Old Roman Catholic Church in Great Britain. His episcopal consecration was declared null and void by the Union of Utrecht's International Old Catholic Bishops' Conference. He claimed his father, Major Arnold Henry Ochterlony Mathew (d. 1894), to have been the 3rd Earl, on the grounds of his grandfather, Major Arnold Nesbit Mathew, of the Indian Army, having been the eldest son of the 1st Earl Landaff, born five months after his parents' marriage. This claim has subsequently been concluded to be based on incorrect information, with Arnold Nesbit Mathew (he originally used the name 'Matthews', as did his son) being in fact the son of William Richard Matthews, of Down Ampney, Gloucestershire, and his wife Anne.

== See also ==
- Viscount Llandaff
