= Stephen Catterson Smith =

English painter

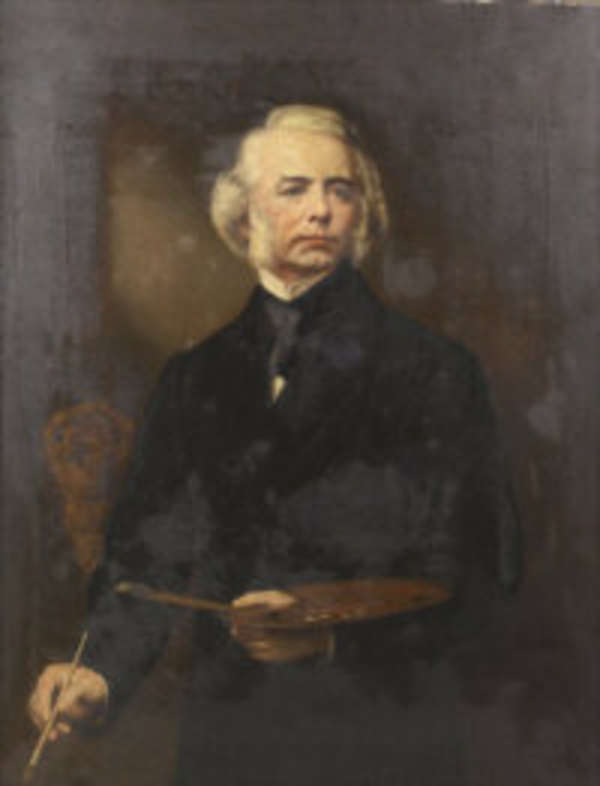
Stephen Catterson Smith the Elder, portrayed by his son Stephen Catterson Smith the Younger.

Stephen Catterson Smith (12 March 1806 – 30 May 1872) was an English portrait-painter and president of the Royal Hibernian Academy.

== Biography ==
Smith was born in Skipton, North Yorkshire, the son of Joseph Smith, artist and coach-painter, and Anne, his wife, daughter of Stephen Catterson of Gawflat, Yorkshire. His parents moved early in his life to Kingston upon Hull, and at the age of about sixteen Smith went to London to support himself by the practical study of art. Obtaining admission to the schools of the Royal Academy, he distinguished himself in the competitions there, and afterwards studied in Paris. He first attracted notice by his skill in drawing portraits in black chalk, many of these being published in lithography by Richard James Lane. He made drawings of this class for H.R.H. the Duchess of Kent, of Queen Victoria (as princess), the duchess herself, the King of Hanover, and other members of the royal family. He then removed for a few years to Yeovil in Somersetshire, returning, however, to London about 1838, when he exhibited some portraits at the Royal Academy.

About 1840 Smith received some commissions to paint portraits in Ireland, which led him to settle first at Derry, and afterwards at Dublin, where he spent the remainder of his life. He soon became Portrait Painter to the Lord Lieutenant, a post he held for almost 30 years. At Dublin Smith quickly became the leading portrait-painter of the day, and was considered very successful with his likenesses both in male and female portraits, painting something in the manner of Sir Thomas Lawrence. Nearly every distinguished person in Ireland sat to Smith during his career in Dublin, including all the lord-lieutenants of Ireland for thirty years. In 1854 he painted from the life a full-length portrait of Queen Victoria for the corporation of Dublin. Many of his portraits were engraved.

Smith was elected an associate of the Royal Hibernian Academy of Arts on 11 May 1844, a full member on 13 September following, and was elected president on 7 March 1859, holding this post until 1864. He was re-elected in 1868, but held the post for only a few months. He was appointed Director of the National Gallery of Ireland in 1868. He continued to paint up to the time of his death, which occurred suddenly in Dublin on 20 May 1872.

== Family ==
Smith married, in 1845, Anne, daughter of Robert Titus Wyke, an English artist, residing at Wexford. She was herself a miniature-painter. By her Smith left six sons and four daughters, of whom Stephen Catterson Smith (a member of the Royal Hibernian Academy and practising in Dublin) and Robert Catterson Smith (practising in London) also adopted art as a profession.
