= Frank C. Matthews =

African-American writer of urban fiction (born 1972)

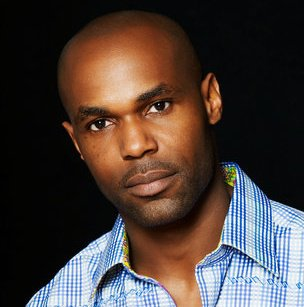
- Born: July 13, 1972 (age 54); New York City, U.S.
- Occupation: Novelist
- Writing career
- Notable work: Respect the Jux
- Literary movement: Black literature
- Website: (website)

Frank C. Matthews (born July 13, 1972) is an African-American writer of urban fiction. His works are influenced by Iceberg Slim and Donald Goines.

== Biography ==
Matthews grew up in Brooklyn and Queens, New York.

In September 2010, director F. Gary Gray (The Italian Job, Set It Off, Friday, Law Abiding Citizen) bought the TV and film rights to Respect The Jux.

== Bibliography ==
- Respect the Jux (2006)
