= Francis Matthews =

Francis or Fran Matthews may refer to:

- Francis Matthews (actor) (1927–2014), British actor
- Francis P. Matthews (1887–1952), 49th United States Secretary of the Navy and the 8th Supreme Knight of the Knights of Columbus
- Francis Matthews (British Army officer) (1903–1976), British Army general
- Fran Matthews (1916–1999), American baseball player

== See also ==
- Frank Matthews (disambiguation)
