= Matthew Francis =

Matthew Francis may refer to:

- Matthew Francis (poet) (born 1956), British poet
- Matthew Francis (footballer) (born 1970), former Australian rules footballer
- Matthew Francis (producer), British television and theatrical producer
- Matt Francis (born 1985), ice hockey player
