= Francis Mathew, 1st Earl Landaff =

Anglo-Irish politician and peer

The Right Honourable Francis Mathew
- Earl Landaff
- Coat of arms
- Tenure: 1797–1806 (Earl Landaff); 1793–1806 (Viscount Landaff); 1783–1806 (Baron Landaff)
- Predecessor: New creation
- Successor: Francis Mathew, 2nd Earl Landaff
- Other titles: Viscount Landaff; Baron Landaff
- Born: September 1738
- Died: 30 July 1806 (aged 67)
- Father: Thomas Mathew
- Mother: Mary Mathew

Francis Mathew, 1st Earl Landaff (September 1738 – 30 July 1806) was an Anglo-Irish politician and peer.

== Biography ==
Mathew was the only son and heir of Thomas and Mary Mathew. His father's family had settled in Ireland from Wales a generation before. He had one sister, Catherine, who married firstly Philip Roe, and secondly John Scott, 1st Earl of Clonmell. She died in 1771. Mathew served in the Irish House of Commons as the Member of Parliament for County Tipperary between 1768 and 1783. In 1769 he was High Sheriff of Tipperary. On 12 October 1783 he was raised to the Peerage of Ireland as Baron Landaff, of Thomastown in the County of Tipperary, and assumed his seat in the Irish House of Lords. On 4 December 1793 he was further honoured when he was made Viscount Landaff.

From 1794 to 1797, Lord Landaff was Colonel of the 14th Regiment of Foot. On 22 November 1797 he was made Earl Landaff. Following the implementation of the Acts of Union 1800, he was elected as one of the 28 original Irish representative peers and took his seat in the British House of Lords. Between 1769 and his death he also held the position of Custos Rotulorum of Tipperary.

== Marriage and issue ==
Francis married first 6 September 1764 to Ellis Smyth, daughter of James Smyth Esq. of Tinny Park, of Co. Wicklow. She died in 1781.

They had four children:

1. Francis James Mathew (1768–1833) marriage childless with Gertrude Cecilia La Touche.
2. Montague James Mathew (1773–1819) died unmarried.
3. George Mathew (1779–1832) died unmarried.
4. Elizabeth Mathew, survived all her brothers and died unmarried in 1842, bequeathing the property to her cousin the Comte de Jarnac and Vicomte de Chabot (1780–1875), whose mother was Elizabeth Smyth, sister of Ellis, Countess of Llandaff.

Francis married secondly in June 1784 to Lady Catherine Skeffington, daughter of Clotworthy Skeffington, 1st Earl of Massereene. She died in 1796. This second marriage produced no children.

Francis's third and final marriage was to the younger daughter of Jeremiah Coghlan of Co. Waterford. The marriage was childless.

Parliament of Ireland
| Preceded by Henry Prittie; Sir Thomas Maude, 2nd Bt | Member of Parliament for County Tipperary; 1768 – 1783; With: Sir Thomas Maude, 2nd Bt (1768–1776); Henry Prittie 1776–1783 | Succeeded by Daniel Toler; Henry Prittie |
Parliament of the United Kingdom
| New post | Representative peer for Ireland; 1800–1806 | Succeeded by The Earl of Charlemont |
Peerage of Ireland
| New creation | Earl Landaff; 1797–1806 | Succeeded by Francis Mathew |
| New creation | Viscount Landaff; 1793–1806 | Succeeded by Francis Mathew |
| New creation | Baron Landaff; 1783–1806 | Succeeded by Francis Mathew |
