= William Meeke =

Irish politician (1758–1830)

Member of Parliament for Penryn
- In office 1796-1800; 1801–1802 Serving with Thomas Wallace

Personal details
- Born: 3 January 1758
- Died: 15 July 1830 (aged 72)
- Spouse: Mary Kelly (m. 1807)
- Education: Emmanuel College, Cambridge; Downing College, Cambridge

William Meeke (3 January 1758 – 15 July 1830) was a Member of Parliament for Callan in the Irish Parliament from 1790 to 1797 and for Penryn, Cornwall, firstly in the House of Commons of Great Britain (1796–1800) and then in the House of Commons of the United Kingdom (1801–1802).

The son of Joseph Easton Meeke of Rotherhithe by his wife Suffina, he was educated at Charterhouse School and Emmanuel College, Cambridge. He was a Fellow of Downing College, Cambridge from 1800 to 1807, when he married Mary Kelly. His sister Elizabeth married the MP Samuel Farmer.

Parliament of Great Britain
Preceded by Sir Francis Basset; Richard Glover	Member of Parliament for Penryn; 1796–1800; With: Thomas Wallace	Succeeded by Parliament of the United Kingdom
Parliament of the United Kingdom
Preceded by Parliament of Great Britain	Member of Parliament for Penryn; 1801–1802; With: Thomas Wallace	Succeeded by Sir Stephen Lushington; Sir John Nicholl
