= Francis Saunderson =

Anglo-Irish Member of Parliament (1754–1827)

Francis Saunderson Esq., MP

Member of Parliament for County Cavan in Irish House of Commons

Member of Parliament for County Cavan in UK House of Commons

Personal details
- Born: 15 September 1754
- Died: 1827 (aged 72–73) Castle Saunderson
- Citizenship: Kingdom of Ireland, United Kingdom of Great Britain and Ireland
- Party: Whigs
- Spouse: Anne Bassett White (died 20 November 1854)
- Children: Alexander Saunderson, James Saunderson, Cecil Saunderson Slater
- Parent(s): Alexander Saunderson Snr., Rose Lloyd
- Education: Eton College

Francis Saunderson (1754–1827) was an Anglo-Irish MP in both the Parliament of Ireland and the post-Acts of Union UK Parliament. He was a member of the Saunderson family seated at Castle Saunderson.

Saunderson attend Eton College. He was High Sheriff of Cavan from 1781 to 1782.

A Whig, he was a member of the Irish House of Commons from 1790 to 1797, and again from 1798 to its dissolution in 1801 (which he had voted against). He was then co-opted onto the first UK parliament for the County Cavan constituency, and then elected in the 1802 general election.

Saunderson married Anne Bassett White of Miskin, Wales in August 1778 or 1779. Their son, Alexander, and grandson, Edward, also became MPs.
