= Henry Prittie, 4th Baron Dunalley =

Henry O'Callaghan Prittie, 4th Baron Dunalley (21 March 1851 – 5 August 1927), was an Anglo-Irish peer.

Dunalley was the son of Henry Prittie, 3rd Baron Dunalley. He was educated at Harrow School and Trinity College, Cambridge. In 1883, Prittie was appointed High Sheriff of Tipperary. He succeeded his father as fourth Baron Dunalley in 1885 but as this was an Irish peerage it did not entitle him to an automatic seat in the House of Lords. However, in 1891 he was elected an Irish representative peer, which he remained until his death. Lord Dunalley also served as Lord Lieutenant of County Tipperary from 1905 to 1922. He died in August 1927, aged 76, and was succeeded in the barony by his son Henry.

He was the owner of 'Countess' a 15-ton yacht on Lough Derg from 1893 to 1919.

He was Commodore of the Lough Derg Yacht Club from 1905 until his death in 1927.

He married Mary Frances Farmer (10 August 1857 – 18 May 1929) daughter of Reginald Onslow Farmer (1828–1904) on 22 August 1876 at Hatfield Hertfordshire. They had six children:

- Henry Cornelius O'Callaghan Prittie (19 July 1877 – 3 May 1948) the 5th Baron Dunalley
- Maura Geraldine Anne Prittie (2 September 1879 – 19 May 1880)
- Francis Reginald Dennis Prittie (15 October 1880 – 19 December 1914)
- Kathleen Everilda Prittie (13 April 1882 – 27 April 1910)
- Mary Prittie (b. 24 January 1885)
- Irene Rose Prittie (24 April 1887 – 2 November 1887)

Coat of arms of Henry Prittie, 4th Baron Dunalley
| Crest A wolf's head erased Or. Escutcheon Per pale Argent and Gules three wolves' heads erased Or. Supporters Dexter a man in armour Proper holding a tilting spear in the right hand. Sinister a stag Proper attired unguled collared and chained Or. Motto In Omnia Paratus (Prepared For All Things) |

== Notes ==
Honorary titles
| Preceded by The Earl de Montalt | Lord Lieutenant of County Tipperary; 1905–1922 | Office abolished |
Political offices
| Preceded by The Earl of Wicklow | Representative peer for Ireland; 1891–1927 | Office lapsed |
Peerage of Ireland
| Preceded by Henry Prittie | Baron Dunalley; 1885–1927 | Succeeded by Henry Prittie |
