= Francis Mathew, 2nd Earl Landaff =

Irish peer and politician

The Right Honourable The Earl Landaff KP
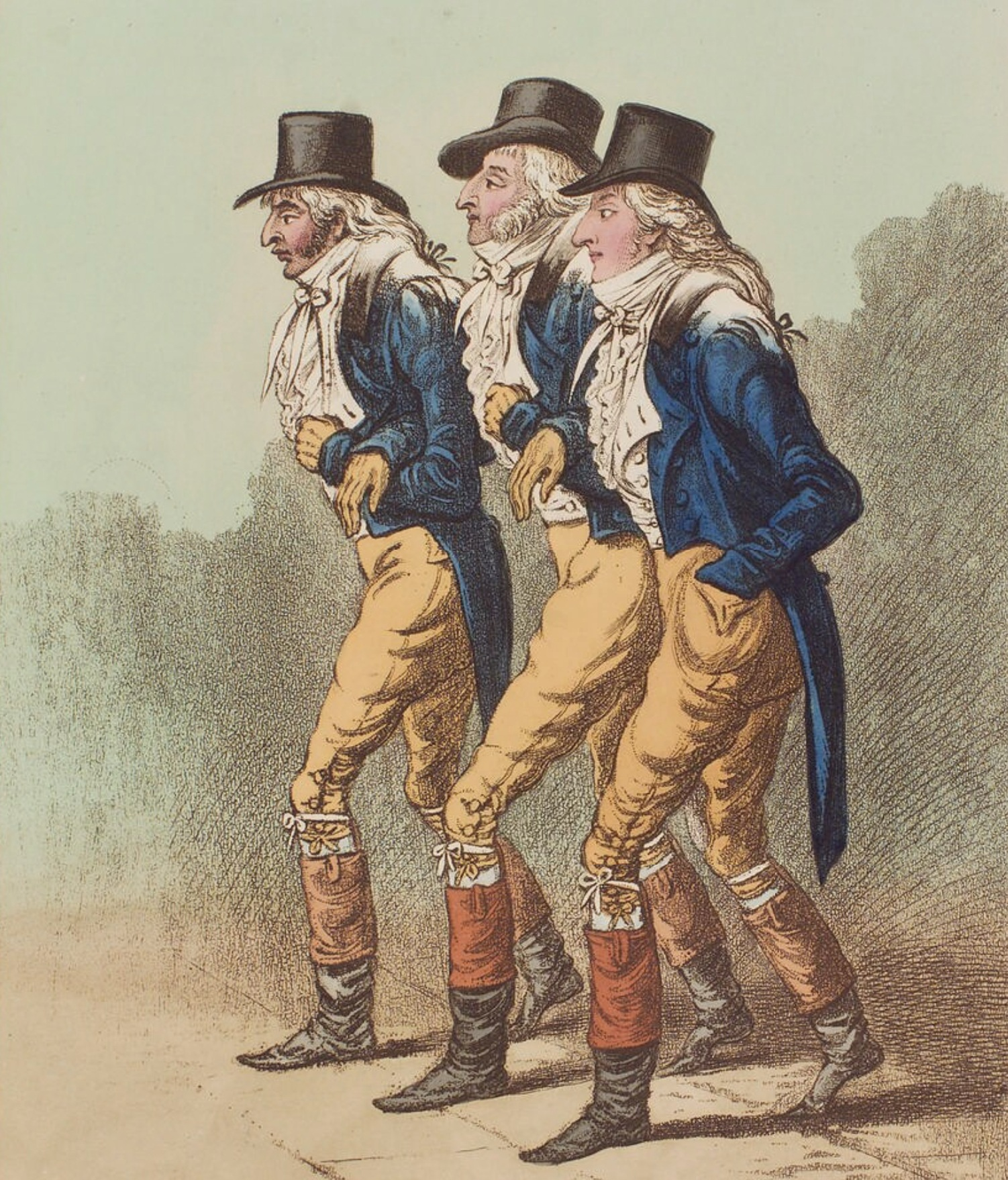
- 1803 portrait of Landaff (centre)
- Born: 20 January 1768
- Died: 12 March 1833 (aged 65); Dublin
- Style: The Honourable (1783–1797), Viscount (1797–1806)
- Title: 2nd Earl Landaff
- Predecessor: Francis Mathew
- Successor: Title became extinct
- Spouse: Gertrude Cecilia La Touche
- Children: None
- Parent: Francis Mathew
- Relatives: Montague James Mathew (brother)

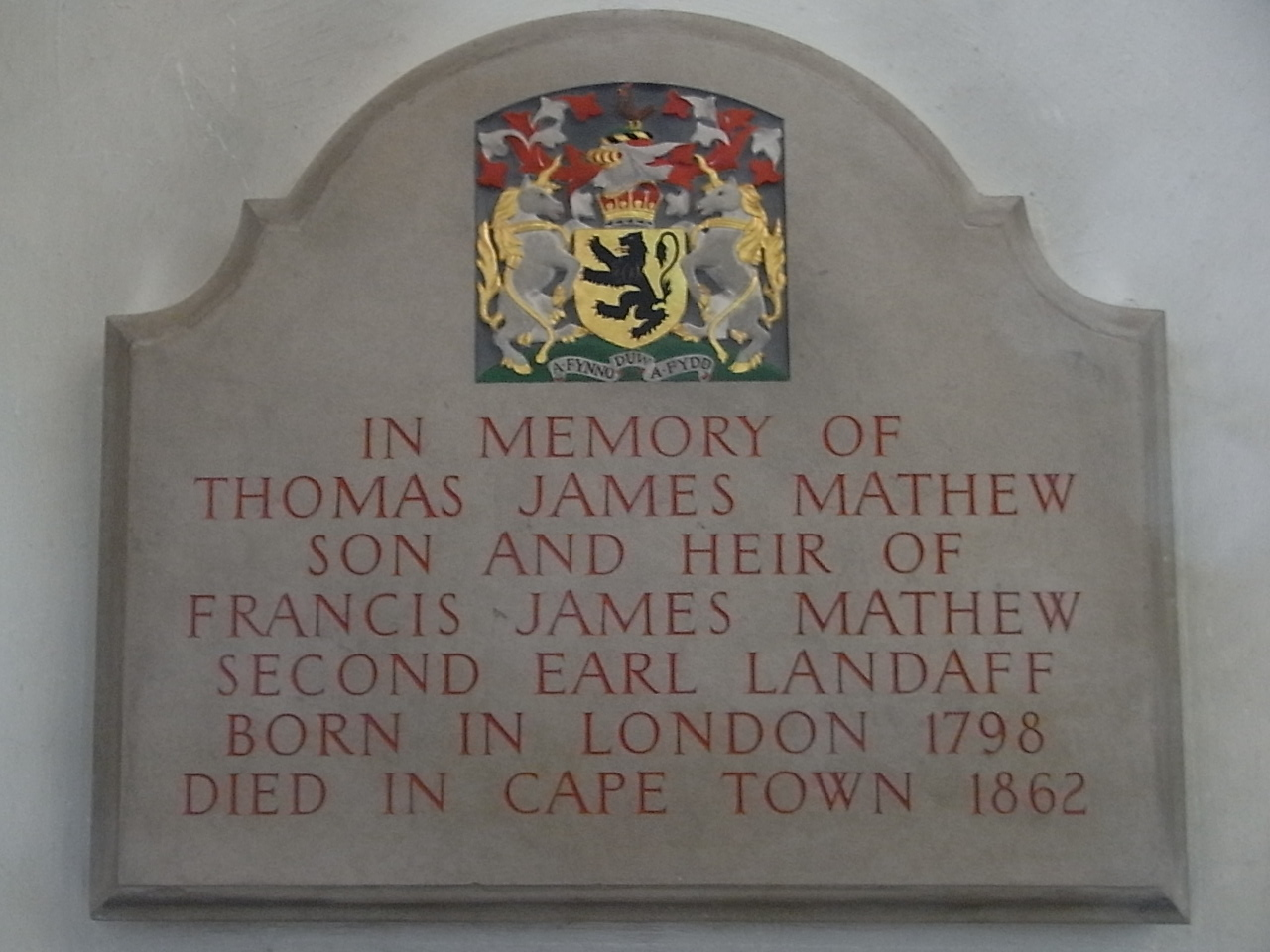
Mural memorial tablet erected 1987 in Llandaff Cathedral: "In memory of Thomas James Mathew son and heir of Francis James Mathew second Earl of Landaff born in London 1798 died in Cape Town 1862". The arms are blazoned: Or, a lion rampant sable. Crest: A heathcock proper. Supporters: Two unicorns rampant silver maned tufted hooved collared and chained or. Motto: A Fynno Duw a Fydd ("What God wills will be")

Francis James Mathew, 2nd Earl Landaff KP (20 January 1768 – 12 March 1833), styled The Honourable Francis Mathew from 1783 to 1797 and Viscount Mathew from 1797 to 1806, was an Irish peer and politician.

Mathew sat for County Tipperary in the Irish House of Commons from 1790 to 1792, when his election was declared invalid. He represented Callan between May and November 1796 and subsequently again Tipperary in the Irish House of Commons until the Act of Union in 1800 and then the United Kingdom House of Commons from 1801 until he succeeded his father in the earldom in 1806. His younger brother Montague James Mathew (1773–1819) succeeded him as one of the two members of the UK parliament for County Tipperary. He was an opponent of the Union and a supporter of Catholic Emancipation, and was also "a personal enemy of George IV" and gave evidence in favour of Queen Caroline regarding her conduct at the Court of Naples during her famous trial.

He was appointed a Knight of the Order of St Patrick on 24 November 1831.

Lord Landaff married Gertrude Cecilia, a daughter of John La Touche, of Kildare. The marriage was childless. He died of syncope in Dublin on 12 March 1833, aged 65, when the titles became extinct. Dying intestate, his estates went to his sister, Lady Elizabeth Mathew, who died in 1842 leaving the fortune to a cousin, the Vicomte de Chabot, the son of her mother's sister Elizabeth Smyth.

Parliament of Ireland
Preceded by Henry Prittie; Daniel Toler	Member of Parliament for County Tipperary; 1790–1792; With: Daniel Toler	Succeeded by Daniel Toler; John Bagwell
Preceded by Nathaniel Warren; William Meeke	Member of Parliament for Callan; 1796; Served alongside: William Meeke	Succeeded by Charles Kendal Bushe; William Meeke
Preceded by Daniel Toler; John Bagwell	Member of Parliament for County Tipperary; 1796 – 1801; With: John Bagwell	Parliament of the United Kingdom
Parliament of the United Kingdom
Parliament of Ireland	Member of Parliament for County Tipperary; 1801 – 1806; Served alongside: John Bagwell	Succeeded by Montague Mathew; Francis Aldborough Prittie
Peerage of Ireland
Preceded by Francis Mathew	Earl Landaff; 1806–1833	Extinct
