= William Bagwell (politician) =

British politician

William Bagwell (1776 – 4 November 1826) was an Irish Tory politician who served for more than twenty years as a Member of Parliament (MP) in the United Kingdom House of Commons.

He was the son of John Bagwell, M.P., and Mary, née Hare. He was the Member of Parliament for Rathcormack in the Parliament of Ireland from 1798 until the Union with Great Britain at the end of 1800, when the constituency of Rathcormack was disenfranchised.

He was elected at a by-election in 1801 as MP for constituency of Clonmel in the Parliament of the United Kingdom and held that seat until his resignation in 1819 to fight a by-election for County Tipperary when the prior member succeeded to the Irish Peerage as Earl of Glengall. He won the seat and held it until the 1826 general election

He resided at the family mansion at Marlfield, Clonmel.

== Sources ==
- A genealogical and heraldic history of the commoners of Great Britain and Ireland John Burke, 1838
- Leigh Rayment's Historical List of MPs

Parliament of the United Kingdom
Vacant	Member of Parliament for Clonmel; 1801–1819	Succeeded by John Kiely
Preceded by Montague James Mathew and Richard Butler, Viscount Caher	Member of Parliament for County Tipperary; March 1819 – 1826; With: Richard Butler, Viscount Caher, to April 1819; Francis Aldborough Prittie, from April 1819	Succeeded by Francis Aldborough Prittie and John Hely-Hutchinson
