= County Tipperary (Parliament of Ireland constituency) =

Pre-1801 Irish constituency

- Former county constituency for the Irish House of Commons
- County: County Tipperary

–1801
- Seats: 2
- Replaced by: County Tipperary (UKHC)

County Tipperary was a constituency represented in the Irish House of Commons until its abolition on 1 January 1801.

== Members of Parliament ==
- 1376: William ?Neghbore? and William Yong were elected to come to England to consult with the king and council about the government of Ireland and about an aid for the king.
- 1560: Patrick Sherlock and Oliver Grace
- 1585: Redmond Everard and James Butler
- 1613–1615 Sir John Everard and Walter Butler (inherited peerage in 1614 and replaced by John Tobyn)
- 1634–1635 Thomas Butler and Tibbett Purcell
- 1661–1666 Thomas Sadlier and Bartholomew Fowke

=== 1689–1801 ===
Election	First MP	Second MP
1689	Nicholas Purcell	James Butler
1692	Sir John Meade, 1st Baronet	Stephen Moore
1703	Sir John Meade, 1st Baronet	James Dawson
1707	James Harrison	James Dawson
1713	George Mathew	James Dawson
1715	Kingsmill Pennefather	Humphrey Minchin
1727	Kingsmill Pennefather	James Dawson
1728	Kingsmill Pennefather	George Mathew
1735	Joseph Damer	George Mathew
1737	Nehemiah Donnellan	George Mathew
1738	Nehemiah Donnellan	Stephen Moore
1761	Henry Prittie	Sir Thomas Maude, 2nd Bt
1768	Francis Mathew	Sir Thomas Maude, 2nd Bt
1776	Francis Mathew	Henry Prittie
1783	Daniel Toler	Henry Prittie
1790	Daniel Toler	Hon. Francis James Mathew
1792	Daniel Toler	John Bagwell
1796	Hon. Francis James Mathew	John Bagwell
1801	Replaced by Westminster constituency of County Tipperary	
