= Henry Prittie, 1st Baron Dunalley =

Irish peer and Member of Parliament

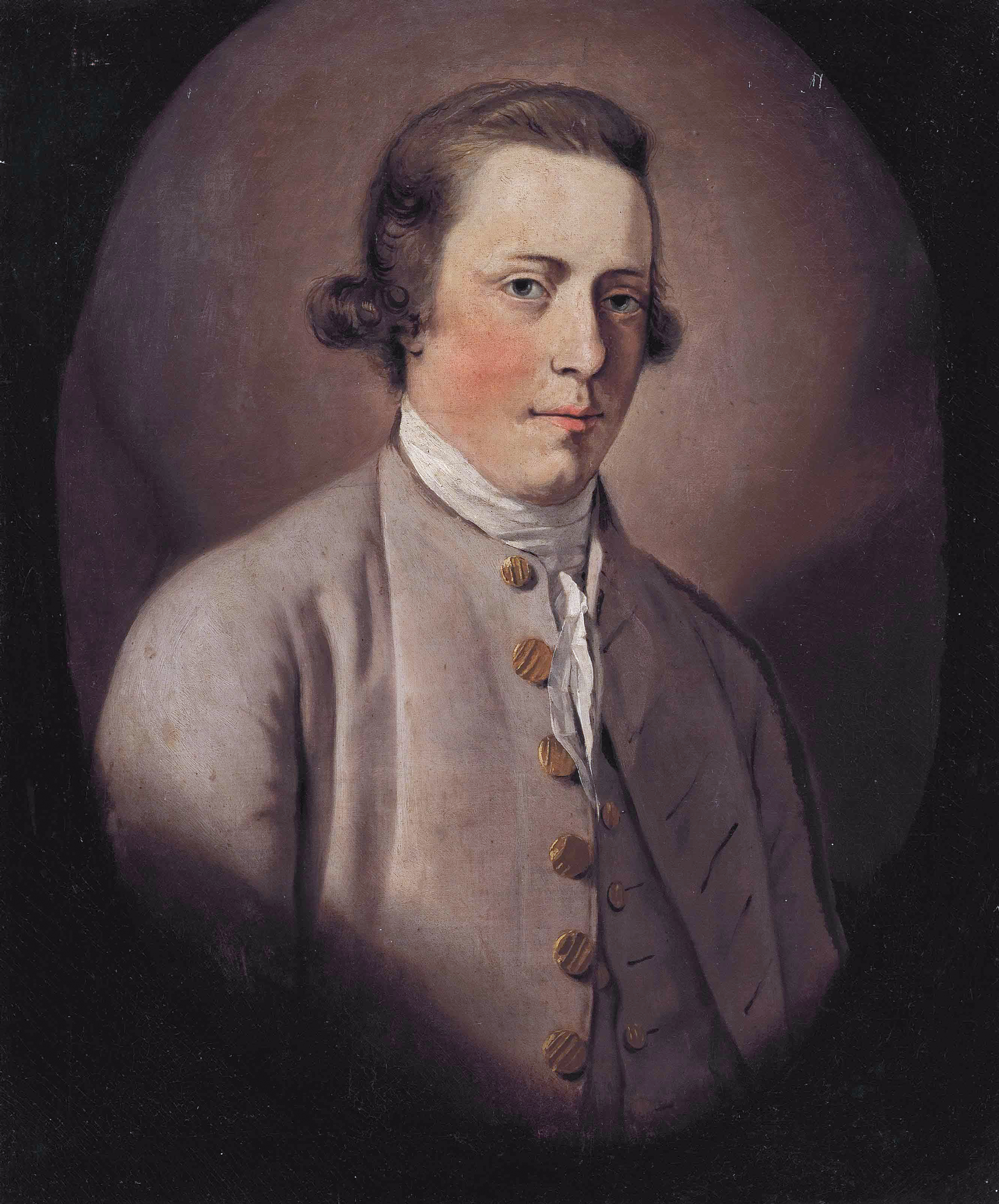
Henry Prittie, 1st Baron Dunalley (1743-1801)

Henry Prittie, 1st Baron Dunalley (3 October 1743 – 3 January 1801) was an Irish peer and Member of Parliament.

Prittie was the son of Henry Prittie of Kilboy, County Tipperary. He was elected to the Irish House of Commons for Banagher in 1767, a seat he held until 1768. He then represented Gowran from 1769 to 1776 and County Tipperary from 1776 to 1790. Prittie was appointed High Sheriff of Tipperary in 1770. He was raised to the Peerage of Ireland as Baron Dunalley, of Kilboy, in the County of Tipperary on 31 July 1800.

Lord Dunalley married Catherine Sadlier, daughter of Francis Sadlier. They had seven children:

- Henry Sadleir (3 May 1775 – 10 October 1854)
- Francis Aldborough (4 June 1779 – 8 March 1853), married firstly Martha Hartpole (d. 1802) daughter of Cook Otway, married secondly Elizabeth Ponsonby (d. 11 January 1849), they had six children including Henry Prittie (January 1807 – 10 September 1885) the 3rd Baron Dunalley.
- Catherine (d. 13 November 1855)
- Deborah (d. 8 Jun 1829)
- Mary (d. 12 February 1859)
- Martha (d. 13 January 1820)
- Elizabeth (d.20 April 1802)

Baron Dunalley died in May 1801, aged 57, and was succeeded in the barony by his son Henry. Lady Catherine died on 26 February 1821.

Coat of arms of Henry Prittie, 1st Baron Dunalley
Crest A wolf's head erased Or. Escutcheon Per pale Argent and Gules three wolves' heads erased Or. Supporters Dexter a man in armour Proper holding a tilting spear in the right hand. Sinister a stag Proper attired unguled collared and chained Or. Motto In Omnia Paratus (Prepared For All Things)

== Notes ==
Parliament of Ireland
Preceded by Peter Holmes; Sir John Meade, 4th Bt	Member of Parliament for Banagher; 1767–1768; With: Peter Holmes	Succeeded by Peter Holmes; Thomas Coghlan
Preceded by Hon. John Ponsonby; James Agar	Member of Parliament for Gowran; 1769–1776; With: Arthur Browne	Succeeded by James Agar; John Butler
Preceded by Francis Mathew	Member of Parliament for County Tipperary; 1776–1790; With: Francis Mathew 1776–1783; Daniel Toler 1783–1790	Succeeded by Daniel Toler; Hon. Francis James Mathew
Peerage of Ireland
New creation	Baron Dunalley; 1800–1801	Succeeded by Henry Sadlier Prittie
