= Richard Bagwell (priest) =

Irish Anglican priest

Richard Hare Bagwell (1777–1826) was an Anglican priest in Ireland in the first quarter of the 19th century.

Bagwell was born in County Cork and educated at Trinity College, Dublin.

Bagwell was MP for the Irish constituency of Cashel from 1799 until the Union in 1801. He then became MP for Cashel in the unified Parliament of the United Kingdom. Under the House of Commons (Clergy Disqualification) Act 1801, passed in June 1801, it was unclear if he would be able to retain his seat; it prevented those in holy orders from sitting in Parliament, but Bagwell had been elected before the Act was passed and it was not clear if it applied to him. Bagwell believed that he should be disqualified and requested his father to move a writ for a by-election; after some debate, Bagwell agreed to resign from Parliament by taking the Chiltern Hundreds. He was succeeded in the seat by his brother John Bagwell.

He was Dean of Kilmacduagh from 1804 to 1805. After that he was Dean of Clogher from 1805 and also Precentor of Cashel from 1805, holding both positions until his death on 25 December 1825.
