= John Bagwell (died 1816) =

Irish politician (1752–1816)

John Bagwell (1752 – 21 December 1816), was a Member of Parliament (MP) for the County Tipperary in the Irish House of Commons and Colonel of the Tipperary Militia which he raised in 1793.

After the Act of Union, he sat in the House of Commons of the United Kingdom for 1801 to 1806 as MP for County Tipperary.

== Family ==
He was the son of William Bagwell and Jane Harper. Bagwell built Marlfield House, Clonmel as the family residence. In 1774 he married Mary Hare, sister of William Hare (1751–1837), 1st earl of Listowel, with whom he had eight children, including William and Richard.

== Politics ==
John Bagwell ran unsuccessfully for Cork City in 1775 and in 1792 was declared a member for County Tipperary in the Irish House of Commons by a committee of the House of Commons, sitting until the Union with Great Britain in 1801. During the Act of Union debates he controversially changed his vote twice, 'to the disgust of the [then] Lord Lieutenant', Charles Cornwallis. Bagwell went on to support the government of William Pitt the Younger, but expected certain appointment for his sons in return, namely 'a deanery for Richard, full-pay employment in the army for John and succession to his colonelcy of the county militia for William.'

After the Union he was elected MP for County Tipperary in the UK Parliament. Bagwell never gained a peerage, the Chief Secretary stating that he believed it was 'because of a nickname'.

Parliament of the United Kingdom
Preceded by Parliament of Ireland	Member of Parliament for County Tipperary; 1801 – 1806; With: Viscount Mathew	Succeeded by Montague James Mathew; Francis Aldborough Prittie
