= Henry Prittie, 2nd Baron Dunalley =

British politician

Coat of arms of Henry Prittie, 2nd Baron Dunalley
Crest A wolf's head erased Or. Escutcheon Per pale Argent and Gules three wolves' heads erased Or. Supporters Dexter a man in armour Proper holding a tilting spear in the right hand. Sinister a stag Proper attired unguled collared and chained Or. Motto In Omnia Paratus (Prepared For All Things)

Henry Prittie, 2nd Baron Dunalley (3 March 1775 – 19 October 1854) was an Anglo-Irish politician.

Dunalley was the son of Henry Prittie, 1st Baron Dunalley, by Catherine Sadleir, daughter of Francis Sadleir and widow of John Bury. Charles Bury, 1st Earl of Charleville, was Dunalley's half-brother. He was elected to the Irish House of Commons for Carlow in 1798, a seat he held until the Irish Parliament was abolished in 1801. The same year he succeeded his father as second Baron Dunalley, but as this was an Irish peerage it did not entitle him to an automatic seat in the British House of Lords. In 1819 Dunalley became a Member of Parliament (MP) in the House of Commons for Okehampton, and represented this constituency until 1824. He was elected an Irish representative peer in 1828, and sat in the House of Lords until his death.

Lord Dunalley married, firstly, Maria Trant, daughter of Dominick Trant, in 1802. After his first wife's death in 1819, he married, secondly, Hon. Emily Maude, daughter of Cornwallis Maude, 1st Viscount Hawarden, in 1826. Lord Dunalley died in October 1854, aged 79. Both his marriages were childless and he was succeeded in the barony by his nephew Henry Prittie.

Parliament of Ireland
Preceded by Sir Frederick Flood, 1st Bt; John Ormsby Vandeleur	Member of Parliament for Carlow; 1798–1801; With: William Elliot 1798; John Wolfe 1798–1801	Succeeded by Parliament of the United Kingdom
Parliament of the United Kingdom
Preceded by Parliament of Ireland	Member of Parliament for Carlow; 1801	Succeeded by Francis Aldborough Prittie
Preceded by Albany Savile; Christopher Savile	Member of Parliament for Okehampton; 1819–1824; With: Albany Savile 1819–1820; Lord Glenorchy 1820–1824	Succeeded by Lord Glenorchy; William Henry Trant
Political offices
Preceded by The Earl Erne	Representative peer for Ireland; 1828–1854	Succeeded by The Viscount Bangor
Peerage of Ireland
Preceded by Henry Prittie	Baron Dunalley; 1801–1854	Succeeded by Henry Prittie
