= Francis Aldborough Prittie =

Irish politician

Francis Aldborough Prittie (4 June 1779 – 8 March 1853) was an Irish Member of Parliament in the Parliament of the United Kingdom.

He was the second son of Henry Prittie, 1st Baron Dunalley, an Irish peer and MP in the Parliament of Ireland. His elder brother was Henry Prittie, 2nd Baron Dunalley. Francis entered Trinity College Dublin in 1795.

After serving for Doneraile in the Parliament of Ireland in 1800, he was elected MP in the Parliament of the United Kingdom for Carlow shortly after the Act of Union, but resigned after three months to take the Escheator of Munster. He was later elected for County Tipperary, sitting from 1806 to 1818 and 1819 to 1831. He was appointed Custos Rotulorum of Tipperary in 1807, a sinecure normally held for life. He was appointed High Sheriff of Tipperary for 1838–39.

He died in 1853 aged 73. He had married twice; firstly to Martha, daughter of Cooke Otway of Castle Otway, Tipperary and the widow of George Hartpole of Shrule Castle, Queen's County, with whom he had a daughter and secondly to Elizabeth, the daughter of George Ponsonby of Corville, Tipperary, with whom he had 3 sons and 3 more daughters. His eldest son, Henry, inherited the family barony to become the 3rd Baron Dunalley.
