= Earl of Clanwilliam =

Title in the peerage of Ireland

Earldom of Clanwilliam
- Arms: Gules, a Chevron Ermine, between three Trefoils slipped Argent. Crest: A Double-Headed Eagle displayed Sable, armed Or. Supporters: Dexter: An Eagle wings close Sable, collared and chained Or; Sinister: A Falcon wings close proper, beaked legged collared and chained Or.
- Creation date: 20 July 1776
- Created by: King George III
- Peerage: Peerage of Ireland
- First holder: John Meade, 1st Viscount Clanwilliam
- Present holder: Patrick Meade, 8th Earl of Clanwilliam
- Heir apparent: John Meade, Lord Gillford
- Remainder to: The 1st Earl's heirs male of the body lawfully begotten
- Subsidiary titles: Viscount Clanwilliam; Baron Gillford; Baron Clanwilliam; Baronet 'of Ballintubber'
- Status: Extant
- Seat: Meade Mews
- Former seat: Montalto Estate
- Motto: TOUJOURS PREST (Always ready)

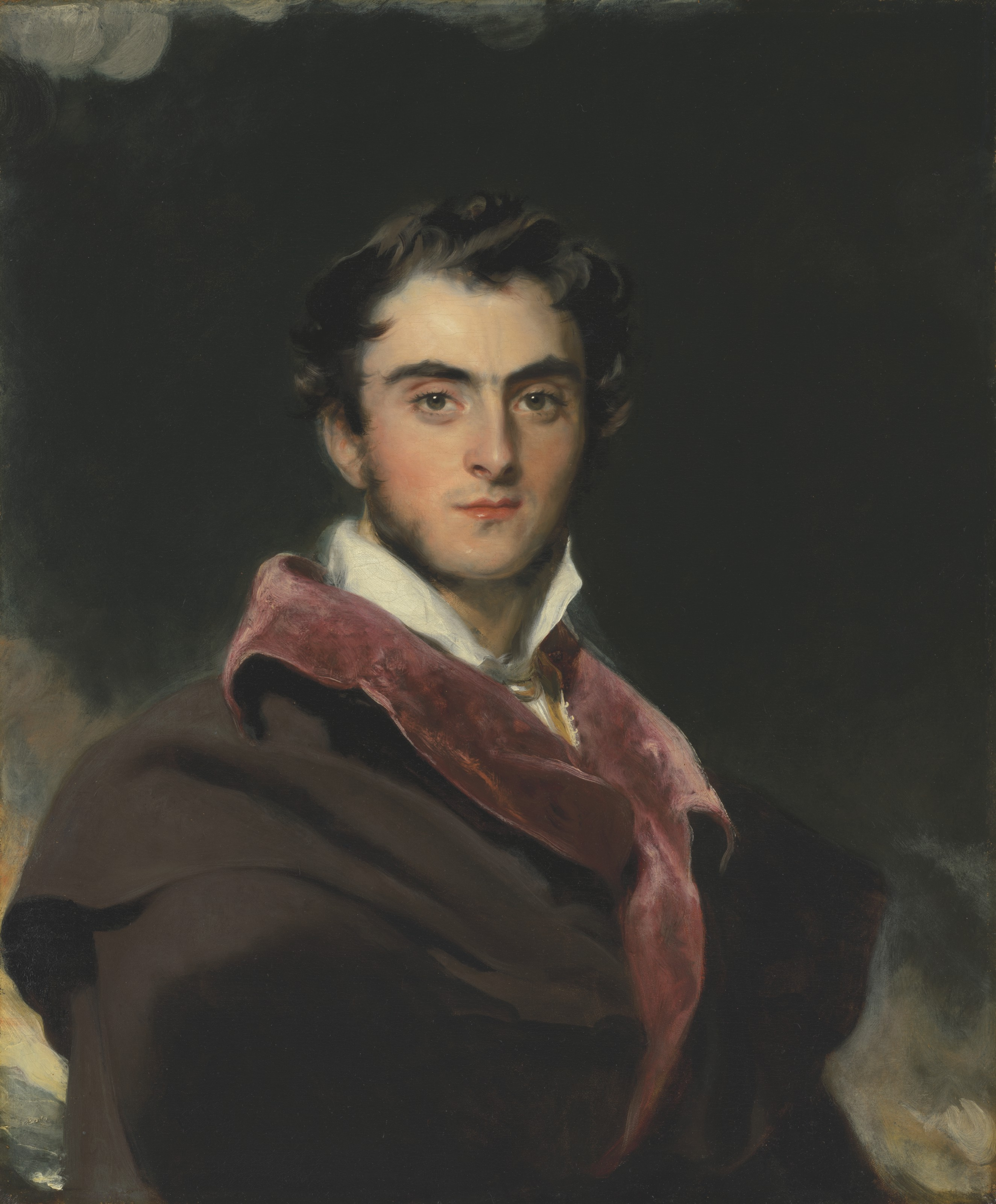
Portrait of Lord Clanwilliam by Thomas Lawrence, 1819

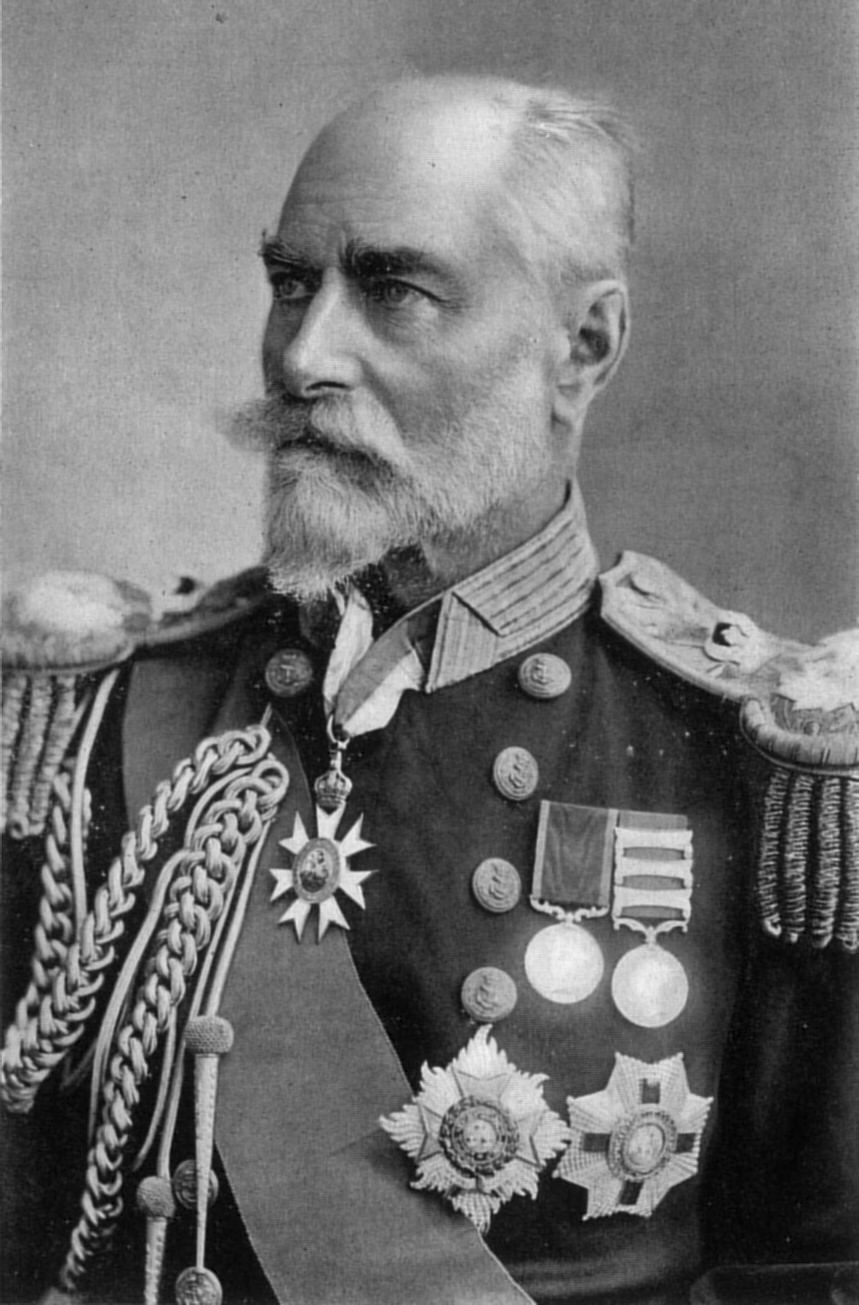
Richard Meade, 4th Earl of Clanwilliam

Earl of Clanwilliam is a title in the Peerage of Ireland. It was created in 1776 for John Meade, 1st Viscount Clanwilliam. The Meade family descends from Sir John Meade, who represented Dublin University and County Tipperary in the Irish House of Commons and served as Attorney-General to James, Duke of York. In 1703, he was created a Baronet, of Ballintubber in the County of Cork, in the Baronetage of Ireland. His eldest son, Pierce, the second Baronet, died unmarried at an early age and was succeeded by his younger brother Richard, the third Baronet. Richard represented Kinsale in the Irish Parliament.

He was succeeded by his son John, the fourth Baronet. He briefly represented Banagher in the Irish House of Commons. He married Theodosia, daughter and wealthy heiress of Robert Hawkins-Magill. Through this marriage the Gill Hall estate in Dromore in County Down came into the Meade family. However, Meade's extravagance was in time to leave the family bankrupt. In 1766 Meade was raised to the Peerage of Ireland as Baron Gillford, of the Manor of Gillford in the County of Down, and Viscount Clanwilliam, of the County of Tipperary. In 1776, he was further honoured when he was made Earl of Clanwilliam, also in the Peerage of Ireland. His grandson, the third Earl (who succeeded his father in 1805), was a prominent diplomat. Lord Clanwilliam was private secretary to and a close associate of Foreign Secretary Lord Castlereagh and also served as Permanent Under-Secretary of State for Foreign Affairs and as Ambassador to Prussia. In 1828 he was created Baron Clanwilliam, of Clanwilliam in the County of Tipperary, in the Peerage of the United Kingdom.

He was succeeded by his eldest son, the fourth Earl. He was an Admiral of the Fleet. On his death, the titles passed to his second but eldest surviving son, the fifth Earl. His only son, the sixth Earl, was Lord Lieutenant of County Down from 1962 to 1979. He had six daughters but no sons and was succeeded by his first cousin, the seventh Earl. He was the second and youngest son of Admiral the Hon. Sir Herbert Meade-Fetherstonehaugh, third son of the fourth Earl. As of 2014 the titles are held by his son, the eighth Earl, who succeeded in 2009.

Several other members of the Meade family have also gained distinction. The Hon. Robert Meade, second son of the first Earl, had reached the rank of lieutenant general in the army by 1814 at the height of the Napoleonic Wars. The Hon. John Meade, third son of the first Earl, was a lieutenant-general in the army. The Venerable the Hon. Pierce Meade, fourth son of the first Earl, was Archdeacon of Dromore. The Hon. Sir Robert Henry Meade, second son of the third Earl, was Permanent Under-Secretary of State for the Colonies from 1892 to 1897. The aforementioned Hon. Sir Herbert Meade-Fetherstonhaugh, third son of the fourth Earl, was an admiral in the Royal Navy.

Christoph Cardinal Graf von Schönborn, Archbishop of Vienna, descends from The 2nd Earl of Clanwilliam. The cardinal heads the Catholic Church in Austria.

The family seat is Meade Mews, in London, but during the tenure of the 6th Earl was at Montalto Estate, near Ballynahinch, County Down.

== Meade Baronets, of Ballintubber (1703) ==
- Sir John Meade, 1st Baronet (1642–1707)
- Sir Pierce Meade, 2nd Baronet (1693–1711)
- Sir Richard Meade, 3rd Baronet (1697–1744)
- Sir John Meade, 4th Baronet (1744–1800) (created Viscount Clanwilliam in 1766 and Earl of Clanwilliam in 1776)

== Earls of Clanwilliam (1776) ==
- John Meade, 1st Earl of Clanwilliam (1744–1800), married Theodosia Hawkins Magill
- Richard Meade, 2nd Earl of Clanwilliam (1766–1805)
- Richard Charles Francis Christian Meade, 3rd Earl of Clanwilliam (1795–1879), grandson of Maria Wilhelmine von Thun und Hohenstein
- Richard James Meade, 4th Earl of Clanwilliam (1832–1907)
- Arthur Vesey Meade, 5th Earl of Clanwilliam (1873–1953)
- John Charles Edmund Carson Meade, 6th Earl of Clanwilliam (1914–1989)
- John Herbert Meade, 7th Earl of Clanwilliam (1919–2009)
- Patrick James Meade, 8th Earl of Clanwilliam (born 1960)

As of 2023 the heir apparent is the 8th earl's son, John Maximilian Meade, Lord Gillford (born 1998).
