= Richard Meade, 2nd Earl of Clanwilliam =

Irish peer (1766–1805)

The Right Honourable The Earl of Clanwilliam
- Born: Richard Meade; 10 May 1766
- Died: 3 September 1805 (aged 39)
- Spouse: Countess Marie-Caroline von Thun (m. 1793; died 1800)
- Children: Caroline, Countess Széchenyi; Richard Meade, 3rd Earl of Clanwilliam; Selina, Countess Clam-Martinic
- Parent(s): John Meade, 1st Earl of Clanwilliam; Theodosia Magill
- Relatives: Robert Meade (brother); John Meade (brother); Pierce Meade (brother)

Richard Meade, 2nd Earl of Clanwilliam (10 May 1766 – 3 September 1805) was an Irish peer, styled Lord Gilford from 1776 to 1800.

== Early life ==
Richard was born on 10 May 1766. He was the eldest of ten children born of the heiress Theodosia Magill, and John Meade, 1st Earl of Clanwilliam. Among his siblings were Lady Anne Meade (wife of William Whaley), Lady Catherine Meade (wife of Richard Wingfield, 4th Viscount Powerscourt), Hon. Robert Meade, Lady Theodosia Sarah Frances Meade (wife of John Cradock, 1st Baron Howden), Hon. John Meade, Hon. Pierce Meade, the Archdeacon of Dromore (who married Elizabeth Percy, a daughter of Bishop Thomas Percy), Hon. Edward Meade, who was killed at the Battle of Abukir, Lady Melosina Adelaide Meade (wife of The 10th Earl of Meath), and Lady Maria Rose Arabella Sarah Meade.

His paternal grandparents were Sir Richard Meade, 3rd Baronet and Catherine Prittie (a daughter of Henry Prittie of Kilboy). His maternal grandparents were Robert Hawkins-Magill, of Gill Hall, Dromore, and, his second wife, Anne Bligh (a daughter of the 1st Earl of Darnley and the 10th Baroness Clifton).

== Career ==
In October 1793, while Gilford was abroad on the Continent, his mother announced him as a candidate for a by-election in County Down, apparently seeking an electoral pact with the Marquess of Downshire, who had just vacated the seat. Ultimately, his candidacy was withdrawn and Downshire's candidate was elected unopposed.

In October 1800, Gilford's father died and he became Earl of Clanwilliam, briefly returning to Ireland. His wife died shortly thereafter. He realized little in the way of an inheritance: he was left the Gill Hall estate in Gilford, County Down, part of his mother's inheritance, but part of her jointure was still charged on its revenues, and her more valuable estate in Rathfriland went to his younger brother Hon. Robert Meade instead.

== Personal life ==
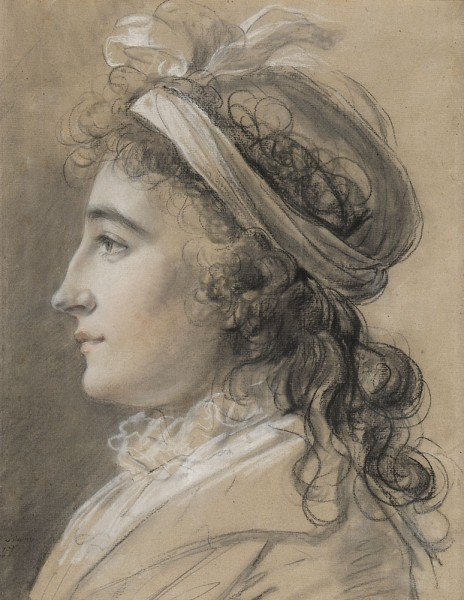
Countess Marie-Caroline von Thun by Vigée Le Brun

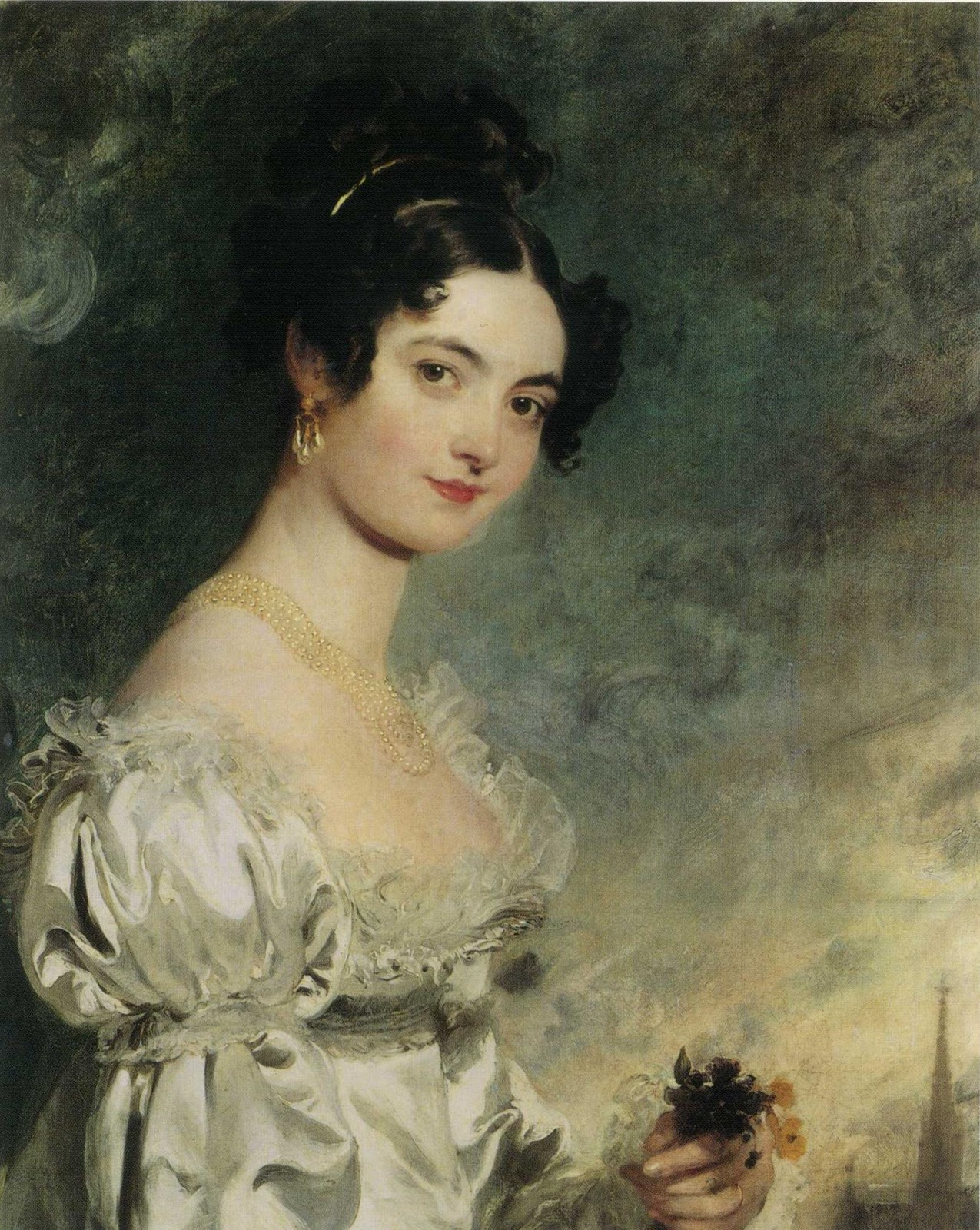
,Portrait of Selina Meade by Sir Thomas Lawrence, 1819

Meanwhile, Gilford was laying the foundations for a family rupture. He fell in love with and married Marie-Caroline, Countess of Thun (1769–1800), daughter of Count Franz Josef Anton von Thun und Hohenstein and Countess Maria Wilhelmine Uhlfeldt (the daughter of Imperial Count Anton Corfiz Ulfeldt), on 16 October 1793. Marriage to a penniless Roman Catholic noblewoman was unacceptable in his Ascendancy family, and the marriage estranged him from his parents, who, at the time, were liquidating his father's estates to pay the enormous debts they had accumulated. His consent was necessary to break the entail, but as he had his own debts and a newborn daughter to provide for, he was obliged to agree to the sale of his patrimony. The couple returned from Ireland to Vienna in 1795 or 1796, where they ultimately had three children:

- Lady Caroline Meade (1794–1820), who married Count Pál Széchenyi, a son of Count Ferenc Széchényi and Countess Julia Festetics de Tolna, in 1811. After her death, he married Countess Emilie Zichy-Ferraris.
- Richard Meade, 3rd Earl of Clanwilliam (1795–1879), who married Lady Elizabeth Herbert, daughter of George Herbert, 11th Earl of Pembroke and Catherine Vorontsov in 1830. Lady Elizabeth's maternal uncle was the Russian general Mikhail Vorontsov.
- Lady Selina Meade (1797–1872), who married Karl Johann Nepomuk, Count of Clam-Martinic.

After his wife died, he spent the rest of his life in Vienna, where he was an avid gardener; while manuring a flowerbed, he contracted an infection that killed him on 3 September 1805. After his death, his two daughters were raised by their aunt Maria Christiane and her husband Karl Alois, Prince Lichnowsky, while his son was raised in England.

=== Descendants ===
Through his son Richard, he was a grandfather of one girl and four boys, including Richard Meade, 4th Earl of Clanwilliam, Sir Robert Henry Meade, and Hon. Sidney Meade, Perpetual Curate of Christ Church in Bradford on Avon, and Canon of Salisbury Cathedral.

Through his daughter Selina, he was a grandfather of Austrian statesman Count Heinrich Jaroslaw Clam-Martinic.

Peerage of Ireland
Preceded by John Meade	Earl of Clanwilliam; 1800–1805	Succeeded by Richard Meade
