= John Meade =

John Meade may refer to:

- Sir John Meade, 1st Baronet (1642–1707), Irish barrister, judge and politician, Member of the Parliament of Ireland 1689–1707
- John Meade, 1st Earl of Clanwilliam (1744–1800), Irish peer and Member of the Parliament of Ireland for Banagher 1764–67
- John Meade (British Army officer) (c. 1775–1849), Member of the UK Parliament for County Down 1805–12
- John Meade, 7th Earl of Clanwilliam (1919–2009), Anglo-Irish nobleman

== See also ==
- John Mead (disambiguation)
