= John Meade, 1st Earl of Clanwilliam =

Anglo-Irish nobleman (1744–1800)

John Meade, 1st Earl of Clanwilliam (21 April 1744 – 19 October 1800), was an Anglo-Irish nobleman, known as Sir John Meade, 4th Baronet, until 1766. Elevated to the Peerage of Ireland, his debauchery and reckless spending led him to sell the family estate. The small town of Clanwilliam in Western Cape, South Africa is named after him.

== Early life ==
The son of Sir Richard Meade, 3rd Baronet and his wife Catherine Prittie, daughter of Henry Prittie of Kilboy, he was born a few days before his father's death.

He inherited a baronetcy and estates worth about £10,000 per year, in County Cork, County Kilkenny, and County Tipperary.

== Career ==
He was returned as Member of Parliament for Banagher in 1764, serving alongside Peter Holmes.

On 17 November 1766, he was created Viscount Clanwilliam and Baron Gilford in the Peerage of Ireland, and entered the Irish House of Lords.

== Personal life ==
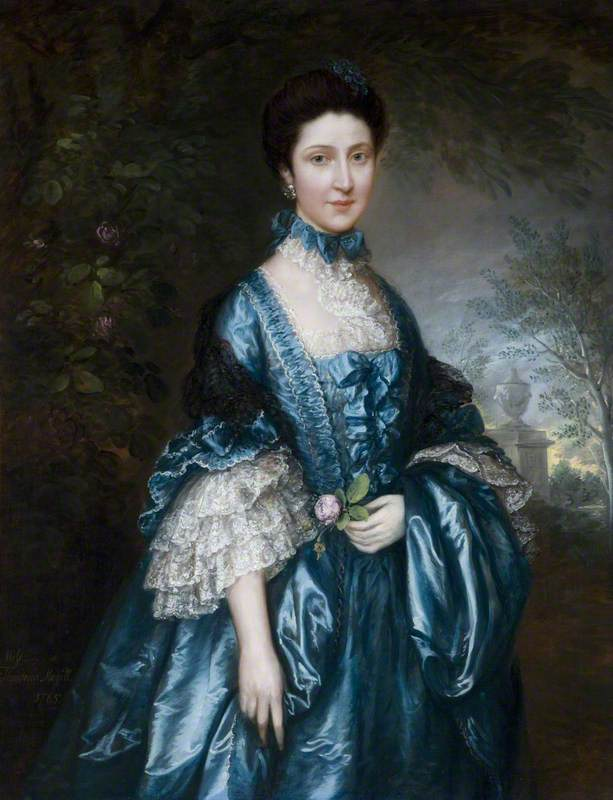
Portrait of his wife, Theodosia, by Thomas Gainsborough

In 1765, he married Theodosia Magill, a wealthy heiress with estates in Gilford and Rathfriland, County Down, worth £4,000 per year. The marriage settlement provided her with a jointure of £3,500 per year should she survive Meade, of which £2,500 was to be charged to his Tipperary estates. Together, the couple had five sons and five daughters:

- Richard Meade, 2nd Earl of Clanwilliam (1766–1805), who married Countess Marie-Caroline von Thun und Hohenstein, daughter of Count Franz Josef Anton von Thun und Hohenstein and Countess Maria Wilhelmine Uhlfeldt (the daughter of Count Anton Corfiz von Ulfeldt), in 1793.
- Lady Anne Meade (1768–1826), who married William Whaley, second son of Richard Chapell Whaley, in 1788.
- Lady Catherine Meade (1770–1793), married Richard Wingfield, 4th Viscount Powerscourt in 1789.
- Hon. Robert Meade (1772–1852), who was the acting governor of the Cape Colony; he married Anne Louise Dalling.
- Lady Theodosia Sarah Frances Meade (1773–1853), who married John Cradock, 1st Baron Howden in 1798.
- Hon. John Meade (c. 1775–1849), who married Urania Caroline Ward, the daughter of Edward Ward, in 1816.
- Hon. Pierce Meade (1776–1835), Archdeacon of Dromore, who married Elizabeth Percy, daughter of Bishop Thomas Percy.
- Hon. Edward Meade (d. 1801), who was educated at Wadham College, Oxford; he joined the 40th Regiment of Foot and was killed at the Battle of Abukir with the 23rd Regiment of Foot.
- Lady Melosina Adelaide Meade (c. 1781–1866), who married John Brabazon, 10th Earl of Meath, in 1801.
- Lady Maria Rose Arabella Sarah Meade (1782–1876)

By September 1800, Clanwilliam suffered badly from dropsy and left his wife at Gill Hall, on the Gilford estate, for his mistress and his Dublin townhouse. He died there on 19 October, having, in the words of his grandson, The 3rd Earl of Clanwilliam, "dissipated, to the last guinea, the Meade estates in Cork and Tipperary".

=== Debts ===
The Clanwilliams were extravagant spenders, the Viscount dissipating large sums on horseracing, gambling, and keeping mistresses. (In 1779, Horace Walpole repeated a rumour, almost certainly exaggerated, that Clanwilliam had arranged the murder of one of his romantic rivals.) His elevation in the peerage as Earl of Clanwilliam on 20 July 1776 probably exacerbated matters, encouraging acts of ostentation like keeping an open house at his townhouse (now part of Newman House) on St Stephen's Green, Dublin. Around 1783, the Clanwilliams' personal property was seized and auctioned; by 1787, his debts had grown to over £72,135. Lord Clanwilliam was forced to sell and mortgage his Cork and Kilkenny estates to pay off the debts; they were also charged with providing marriage portions for his daughters Anne and Catherine in 1788 and 1789. As these estates had provided maintenance for his eldest son Lord Gilford, Gilford was given £1,700 per year from the Tipperary and Down estates instead.

The debt still stood at £31,327 in 1791, and grew to £46,251 in 1795. Clanwilliam found himself obliged to begin liquidating the Tipperary estate in 1793, a process that continued until 1805, at the cost of providing portions for his remaining younger children. Gilford's consent was needed to break the entail, but as he had contracted debts of his own and married the Bohemian, Roman Catholic, noblewoman Countess Caroline Thun without the approval of his parents in October 1793, he was in no position to obstruct them. He was granted a small provision from his mother's Down estates and left to live in Vienna. In fact, the resettlement of the family estates that ensued was largely to the benefit of the Countess, at the expense of the Earl and Lord Gilford.

== Legacy ==
On 21 January 1814, his son-in-law Sir John Cradock named Clanwilliam, South Africa in honor of the 1st Earl.

== Bibliography ==
- Malcolmson, Anthony (1999). "A Woman Scorned?: Theodosia, Countess of Clanwilliam (1743-1817)". Ulster Genealogical Review.

Parliament of Ireland
Preceded by Peter Holmes; John Pigott	Member of Parliament for Banagher; 1764–1766; With: Peter Holmes	Succeeded by Peter Holmes; Henry Prittie
Peerage of Ireland
New creation	Earl of Clanwilliam; 1776–1800	Succeeded by Richard Meade
New creation	Viscount Clanwilliam; 1766–1800	Succeeded by Richard Meade
Baronetage of Ireland
Preceded by Richard Meade	Baronet (of Ballintubber); 1744–1800	Succeeded by Richard Meade
