= Admiral Meade =

Admiral Meade may refer to:

- Richard Meade, 4th Earl of Clanwilliam (1832–1907), British Royal Navy admiral
- Richard Worsam Meade III (1837–1897), U.S. Navy rear admiral

== See also ==
- Jonathan Mead (born 1964), Royal Australian Navy vice admiral
- Herbert Meade-Fetherstonhaugh (1875–1964), British Royal Navy admiral
