= James Cavendish =

James Cavendish may refer to:

- Lord James Cavendish (MP for Malton) (1701–1741), British soldier and MP
- Lord James Cavendish (MP for Derby) (died 1751), British MP
- James Cavendish (Irish MP) (died 1808), Anglo-Irish MP
