= Sir Edward Hoare, 2nd Baronet =

Anglo-Irish politician (1745–1814)

Sir Edward Hoare, 2nd Baronet (14 March 1745 – 30 April 1814) was an Anglo-Irish politician.

He was the son of Sir Joseph Hoare, 1st Baronet and Catherine Somerville and was commissioned as an officer in the service of the 13th Light Dragoons, eventually attaining the rank of captain.

He was elected to the Irish House of Commons as the Member of Parliament for Carlow, sitting between 1768 and 1776. He was later elected MP for Banagher in 1790, sitting until 1798, and was again elected for the same constituency later in the year, sitting until 1800.

He succeeded to his father's baronetcy on 24 December 1801. He married Clotilda Wallis, the daughter of William Wallis, on 14 September 1771 and together they had three children.

Parliament of Ireland
| Preceded by Robert Doyne | Carlow; 1768–1776 | Succeeded by John Prendergast |
| Preceded by Peter Holmes | Banagher; 1790–1798 | Succeeded by John Ponsonby, 1st Viscount Ponsonby |
| Preceded by John Metge | Banagher; 1798–1800 | Succeeded by John Philpot Curran |
Baronetage of Ireland
| Preceded by Joseph Hoare | Baronet (of Annabella); 1801–1814 | Succeeded by Joseph Hoare |
