= Badgemore =

Coordinates: 51.54232°N 0.92452°W

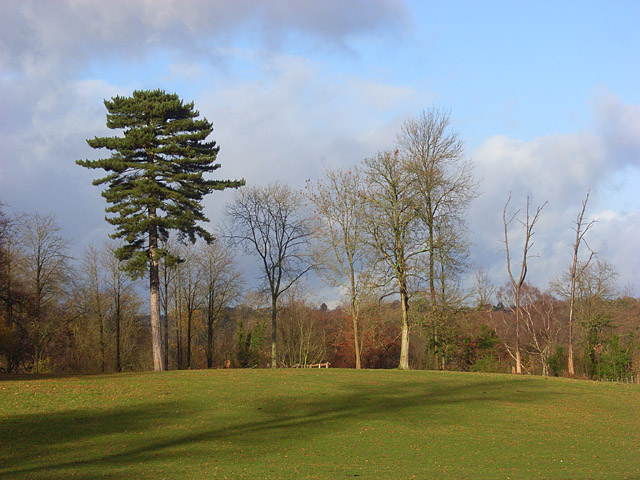
- Pastures at Badgemore

- Location within Oxfordshire
- Civil parish: Bix and Assendon; Rotherfield Greys
- District: South Oxfordshire
- Shire county: Oxfordshire
- Region: South East
- Country: England
- Sovereign state: United Kingdom

Badgemore is an area in the civil parish of Rotherfield Greys in the South Oxfordshire district of Oxfordshire, England. It is centred on the estate of Badgemore House and lies immediately west of Henley-on-Thames.

== History ==
Badgemore was anciently a manor. It was one of a considerable number of manors in Oxfordshire that were given by William the Conqueror to Henry de Ferrers. The manor of Badgemore became a modest country estate, comprising Badgemore House and the adjoining farm of Badgemore End. In the early 19th century the house passed to Charles Lane, and later that century it was acquired by Richard Ovey, who was High Sheriff of Oxfordshire. In 1884 Ovey commissioned John Norton to re-model and enlarge the house.

Ovey leased Badgemore to Admiral of the Fleet the Earl of Clanwilliam who received a visit from Carola, Queen of Saxony there in April 1905. Clanwilliam died at Badgemore in August 1907. The house is now a serviced office facility within the grounds of a golf club.

In terms of parishes, the manor of Badgemore formed part of the ancient parish of Henley-on-Thames, but lay outside the town's borough boundaries. The Local Government Act 1894 directed that civil parishes were no longer allowed to straddle borough boundaries. The parish of Henley-on-Thames was therefore reduced to match the borough, and the rural parts of the old parish outside the borough became a new civil parish, which was named Badgemore after the main estate in that area. The parish of Badgemore was abolished in 1952, when its area was split between Rotherfield Greys and Bix, with the area around Badgemore House and Badgemore End being in the part transferred to Rotherfield Greys. At the 1951 census (the last before the abolition of the civil parish), Badgemore had a population of 172.

== Sources ==
- Heathcote, Tony (2002). The British Admirals of the Fleet 1734 – 1995. Pen & Sword Ltd. ISBN 0-85052-835-6.
