= Richard Malone, 1st Baron Sunderlin =

Anglo-Irish politician and peer

Richard Malone, 1st Baron Sunderlin (c.1738 – 14 April 1816) was an Anglo-Irish politician and peer.

Sunderlin was the eldest son and heir of Edmond Malone, judge of the Court of Common Pleas (Ireland), and Catherine Collier, a cousin of the Earl of Catherlough. His uncle was the barrister and politician, Anthony Malone, from whom Sunderlin inherited extensive estates in the counties of Westmeath, Roscommon, Longford, Cavan, and Dublin. He was educated at Trinity College, Dublin, from where he graduated in 1755, before studying for an MA at Christ Church, Oxford, which he achieved in 1759. He also attended Middle Temple and became a barrister, practising in Ireland.

He served as the Member of Parliament for Granard between 1769 and 1776, and then as the MP for Banagher from 1783 to 1785. On 30 June 1785, he was created Baron Sunderlin of Lake Sunderlin in the Peerage of Ireland, thus entitling him to a seat in the Irish House of Lords. As Sunderlin had no children, a patent was created in 1797, when he was made Baron Sunderlin of Baronston, also in the Peerage of Ireland, with special remainder to his brother, the noted Shakespearean scholar and editor, Edmond Malone. However, his brother predeceased him, and both titles became extinct upon his death. There followed a protracted dispute over the Malone inheritance, which was blamed on his Uncle Anthony, who though a very eminent lawyer, failed to make sufficiently clear in his will what should happen in such a contingency.

Parliament of the United Kingdom
Preceded by Gervase Parker Bushe; Anthony Malone	Member of Parliament for Granard; 1769–1776; With: Gervase Parker Bushe	Succeeded by Thomas Maunsell; John Kilpatrick
Preceded by Peter Holmes; James Cavendish	Member of Parliament for Banagher; 1769–1776; With: Peter Holmes	Succeeded by Peter Holmes; Edward Bellingham Swan
