= John Mead =

John Mead may refer to:

- John A. Mead (1841–1920), American physician, businessman and politician
- John Mead (art director) (fl. 1930–1940), British art director and set designer
- John Mead (British Army officer) (born 1971), British general

== See also ==
- John Meade (disambiguation)
