= Patrick Meade, 8th Earl of Clanwilliam =

Patrick Meade

Patrick Meade, 8th Earl of Clanwilliam (born 28 December 1960), styled Baron Gillford from March 1989 to December 2009, is a businessman, government and financial communications specialist.

The then Lord Gillford succeeded to the Earldom of Clanwilliam following the death of his father, the 7th Earl, in December 2009.

Educated at Eton College and the Royal Military Academy, Sandhurst, the future Lord Clanwilliam started his business career with Hanson plc, and has since been the director of Eurasia Drilling Company, the largest drilling and work-over company operating in Eurasia, Polyus Gold OJSC, the largest Russian gold mining company, AFK Sistema, the largest conglomerate holding company in Russia, and NMC Health. He was the owner (with an 80% shareholding) of the lobbying firm Meade, Hall & Associates.

Lord Clanwilliam was active in the Conservative Party. Sitting as a councillor for two terms in the Royal Borough of Kensington and Chelsea, Clanwilliam was a Conservative Party donor and sponsored a table costing some £1,000 per person at the party's 2013 Summer Ball.

Peerage of Ireland
| Preceded by John Herbert Meade | Earl of Clanwilliam; 2009–present | Incumbent |
