= Peter Holmes (1731–1802) =

Irish High Sheriff and MP

Peter Holmes (1731–1802) of Peterfield was an Irish High Sheriff and MP in the Parliament of Ireland.

He was the son of Robert Holmes of Peterfield, County Tipperary.

Peter was High Sheriff of Tipperary for 1772 and served as Member of Parliament for Banagher from 1761 to 1790. He was also MP for Kilmallock from 1790 to 1797 and for Doneraile from 1798 to 1800.

He died in 1802. He had married Elizabeth, the daughter of Henry Prittie of Kilboy, County Tipperary; they had no children.

Parliament of Ireland
Preceded by Richard Trench; Henry Lestrange	Member of Parliament for Banagher; 1761–1790; With: John Pigott 1761–1764; Sir John Meade 1764–1767; Henry Prittie 1766–1768; Thomas Coghlan 1768–1776; James Cavendish 1776–1783; Richard Malone 1783–1785; Edward Bellingham Swan 1785–1790	Succeeded by Edward Hoare; John Metge
