= Arthur Meade, 5th Earl of Clanwilliam =

British army officer (1873–1953)

The Earl of Clanwilliam MC DL
- Born: Arthur Vesey Meade; 14 January 1873; County Down, Ireland
- Died: 23 January 1953 (aged 80); Bagshot, Surrey, England
- Education: Eton College
- Spouse: Muriel Stephenson (m. 1909)
- Parents: Admiral Richard Meade (father); Elizabeth Kennedy (mother)
- Military career
- Allegiance: United Kingdom
- Branch: British Army
- Rank: Major
- Unit: Royal Horse Guards
- Conflicts: Second Boer War; World War I
- Awards: Military Cross; Mentioned in despatches

Major Arthur Vesey Meade, 5th Earl of Clanwilliam, MC DL (14 January 1873 – 23 January 1953), styled Lord Dromore between 1905 and 1907, was a British Army officer and politician.

== Early life and background ==
Arthur Meade was the second, but eldest surviving, son of Admiral of the Fleet Richard Meade, 4th Earl of Clanwilliam, and Elizabeth, daughter of Sir Arthur Kennedy GCMG CB, governor of various colonies including Queensland, Hong Kong and Vancouver Island.

He was educated at Eton and joined the Royal Horse Guards.

Since the death of his elder brother in 1905 he bore the courtesy title Lord Dromore, and two years later, upon the death of his father, he became the fifth Earl of Clanwilliam.

== Military career ==
Meade was commissioned into the British Army as a second lieutenant in the Royal Horse Guards on 13 February 1895, and was promoted to lieutenant on 4 March 1896. He was appointed temporarily as adjutant in his regiment on 9 October 1899. After the outbreak of the Second Boer War, a detachment of the Royal Horse Guards were sent to South Africa in November 1899, taking part in battles in early 1900. He was mentioned in despatches (31 March 1900), and was severely wounded. Promoted to captain in 1900, he subsequently served as Assistant Provost Marshal and Staff Captain. In early 1902 he was seconded to serve with the 30th Battalion, Imperial Yeomanry, as second-in-command with the temporary rank of major. The battalion left Southampton for South Africa in early May, but arrived after the end of hostilities the following month. Meade left South Africa shortly thereafter, on the SS Sardinia, which arrived at Southampton in October 1902. He relinquished his commission with the Imperial Yeomanry in November 1902. After a short time in India as an extra ADC to the viceroy, Lord Curzon, he returned to England in 1904 and served as adjutant of the Royal Horse Guards until 1907, retiring and becoming a captain on the Reserve of Officers on his marriage in 1909.

== Later life ==
After his retirement, he divided his time between his property in Ireland (Montalto, Ballynahinch, County Down) and London. When war broke out in 1914 he returned to the Army and served in France with his regiment from 1915 to 1919 with distinction, being mentioned in dispatches and gaining the Military Cross. On returning to London he succeeded Lord Kintore as chairman of the Carlton Club.

During the 1939–45 war he was for some time an unpaid assistant Whip in the House of Lords with a seat on the Front Bench. Although not a very frequent speaker in the Upper Chamber, he was a valuable member of committees, both as chairman and member.

== Family ==
He married in 1909 Muriel, daughter of Russell Stephenson and widow of the Hon. Oliver Howard. She died in June 1952. There was one son and two daughters of the marriage, and the title devolved upon the son, Major John Meade, 6th Earl of Clanwilliam (1914–1989). Clanwilliam died on 23 January 1953 at his home in Bagshot, Surrey.

Peerage of Ireland
Preceded by Richard James Meade	Earl of Clanwilliam; 1907–1953	Succeeded by John Charles Edmund Carson Meade
