= Portrait of Selina Meade =

1819 painting by Thomas Lawrence

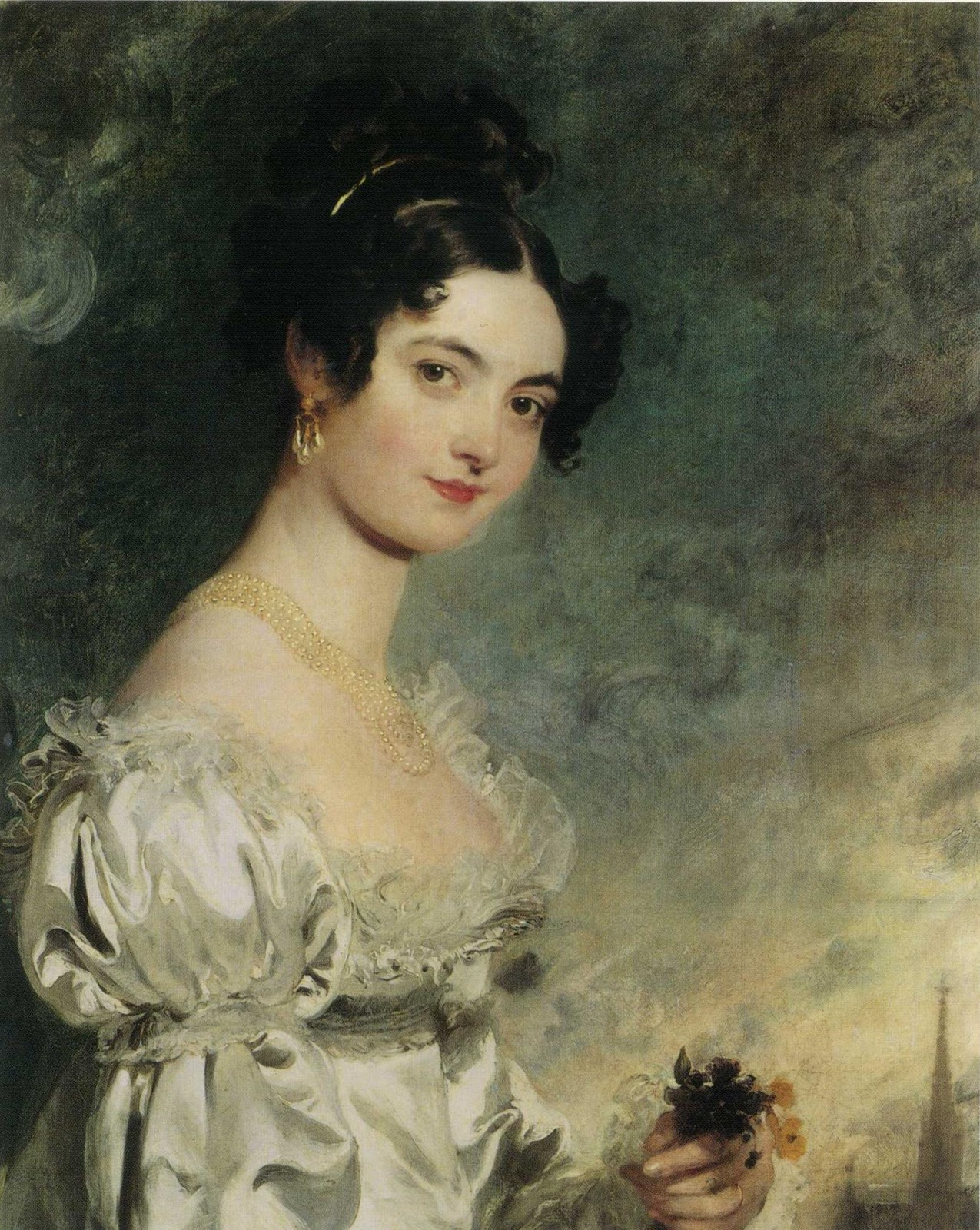
- Artist: Thomas Lawrence
- Year: 1819
- Type: Oil on canvas, portrait painting
- Dimensions: 76 cm × 62 cm (30 in × 24 in)
- Location: Private Collection

Portrait of Selina Meade is an 1819 portrait painting by the British artist Thomas Lawrence. It depicts Lady Selina Meade, who came from an Anglo-Irish background. After her father Earl of Clanwilliam fell out with his family in Ireland he settled in Austria where she grew up. Her elder brother Richard Meade, 3rd Earl of Clanwilliam was an aide to the British Foreign Secretary Lord Castlereagh.

Following his attendance at the Congress of Aix-la-Chapelle to paint notable members of the Quadruple Alliance as part of a commission from the Prince Regent, Lawrence travelled to Vienna to paint the Austrian Emperor and other notables. In the Austrian capital he painted Selina Meade in the fashionable style of the Regency era. In the bottom right is the spire of Saint Stephen's Cathedral.

The work was displayed at the Royal Academy Exhibition of 1820 at Somerset House in London. The painting was sold at the auction house Christie's for more than £2.85 million in 2019. Lawrence also produced a depiction of her brother Portrait of Lord Clanwilliam as a companion piece during the same period.

== Bibliography ==
- Albinson, Cassandra, Funnell, Peter & Peltz, Lucy. Thomas Lawrence: Regency Power and Brilliance. Yale University Press, 2010.
- Goldring, Douglas. Regency Portrait Painter: The Life of Sir Thomas Lawrence. Macdonald, 1951.
- Levey, Michael. Sir Thomas Lawrence. Yale University Press, 2005.
