= Portrait of Lord Clanwilliam =

1819 painting by Thomas Lawrence

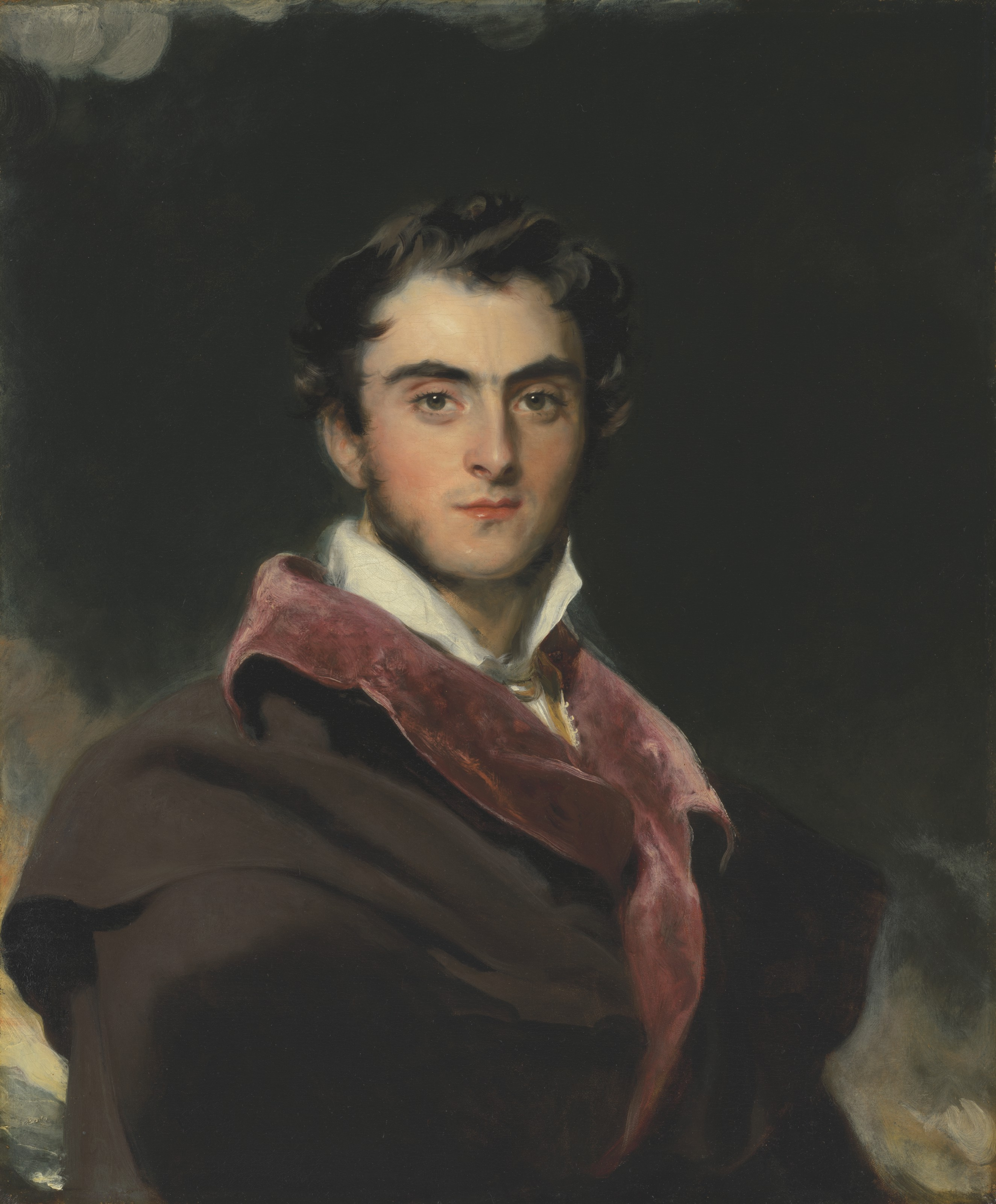
- Artist: Thomas Lawrence
- Year: 1819
- Type: Oil on canvas, portrait painting
- Dimensions: 76.2 cm × 62.5 cm (30.0 in × 24.6 in)
- Location: Private Collection

Portrait of Lord Clanwilliam is an 1819 portrait painting by the British artist Thomas Lawrence. It depicts the Irish diplomat Richard Meade, 3rd Earl of Clanwilliam, a prominent figure of the Regency era. Lawrence was a noted Romantic painter who was celebrated for his fashionable, stylish portraits. The following year he was elected President of the Royal Academy.

== Sitter ==
Clanwilliam was the son of the Anglo-Irish aristocrat Lord Clanwilliam and his Austrian wife. Along with his sister Selina, he grew up in Vienna. As a young man he became private secretary of the British Foreign Secretary Lord Castlereagh. After Castlereagh's suicide in 1822, he served as Ambassador to Prussia from 1823 until 1827.

== Painting ==
The painting was almost certainly produced in Vienna in 1819, where Lawrence went as part of his large-scale commission by the Prince Regent to paint the European leaders responsible for the defeat of Napoleon. The work's survival was unknown to scholars until it was auctioned by Christie's in 2021, selling for just under £600,000. He later sat for a full-length by Lawrence that was displayed at the Royal Academy Exhibition of 1824 at Somerset House. A companion painting of his sister Portrait of Selina Meade sold for £2.85 million in 2018.

== Bibliography ==
- Albinson, Cassandra, Funnell, Peter & Peltz, Lucy. Thomas Lawrence: Regency Power and Brilliance. Yale University Press, 2010.
- Goldring, Douglas. Regency Portrait Painter: The Life of Sir Thomas Lawrence. Macdonald, 1951.
- Jackson, Alvin. United Kingdoms: Multinational Union States in Europe and Beyond, 1800-1925. Oxford University Press, 2023.
- Levey, Michael. Sir Thomas Lawrence. Yale University Press, 2005.
