= Sir John Meade, 1st Baronet =

Irish barrister, judge and politician (1642–1707)

Sir John Meade, 1st Baronet (1642–1707) was an Irish barrister, judge and politician. He was the first of the Meade Baronets of Ballintubber, and an ancestor of the Earls of Clanwilliam. He was unusual among the lawyers of his time for his lack of ambition to become a judge of the High Court, despite being generally regarded as a barrister of "excellent parts (qualities)". In matters of religion, he seems to have been, by the standards of his time, a man of very tolerant views: although he was himself a Protestant, he damaged his career by marrying Elizabeth Butler, who was a Roman Catholic, as his third wife.

== Early life ==
He was born in Cork City, son of Colonel William Meade and Elizabeth Travers; he was a grandson of Sir John Meade senior, of Balintubber, and through his paternal grandmother, Catherine Sarsfield, a great-grandson of the notoriously corrupt judge Dominick Sarsfield, 1st Viscount Sarsfield. One great-great-grandfather, John Meagh or Meade, was appointed the first Recorder of Cork between 1570 and 1574, and also sat in the Irish House of Commons as member for Cork City in the Parliaments of 1559 and 1585. Sir John's mother Elizabeth Travers was the daughter of Sir Robert Travers (died 1647), Judge Advocate of Ireland and member of the Irish House of Commons for Clonakilty, who was killed at the Battle of Knocknanuss, and his second wife Elizabeth Boyle, daughter of Richard Boyle, Archbishop of Tuam. Meade was thus a close family connection of the "Great Earl of Cork", Richard Boyle. His younger sister Eleanor became the fourth wife of Godwin Swift, uncle and guardian of Jonathan Swift, and another sister, Joanna, is recorded as the grandmother of the writer Laetitia Pilkington. By his third marriage he also became a member of the great Butler dynasty, although this proved to be something of a mixed blessing as far as his career went, as he married into a largely Roman Catholic branch of the family.

== Career ==
He went to a local school in Kinsale. He entered Trinity College Dublin in 1658 but did not take a degree. He studied law at Gray's Inn and then proceeded to the King's Inn in 1668. He became King's Counsel in 1685. In 1682 he was employed by the Crown in the trials of a number of Catholics in Munster for conspiracy. In 1685 he sat on a controversial Commission of Oyer and Terminer in County Tipperary to try a number of people charged with spreading false rumours of an impending massacre of Protestants.

He became Attorney General to the Duke of York (the future King James II of England), and Chief Justice (Seneschal) of the Palatine court of Tipperary. The latter office was generally seen as a sinecure, although the fact that there was a second justice (sometimes called Master of the Rolls) of the Palatine Court suggests that the workload may have been heavy enough. Meade was a fine lawyer, but he seems to have had little interest in becoming a High Court judge, perhaps because his real interest was in politics. He sat in the Irish House of Commons, first for Trinity College Dublin in the Patriot Parliament of 1689, and then for County Tipperary for the rest of his life. He was somewhat reluctant to sit in the Patriot Parliament but agreed after it became clear that Trinity College would not nominate a Catholic member.

Despite his decision, apparently with some misgivings, to sit in the Jacobite Patriot Parliament, he was regarded in his later years as a staunch supporter of William III of England. After the triumph of William's cause in 1690, he received a fresh appointment as King's Counsel, and was spoken of as a likely candidate for the office of Third Irish Serjeant in 1692. However, Henry Sydney, 1st Earl of Romney, the Lord Lieutenant of Ireland objected to Meade's appointment, referring to "some exceptions (i.e. objections) against him". This was clearly a reference to Meade's third wife, Elizabeth Butler, daughter of the second Viscount Ikerrin, who was a Roman Catholic; such a marriage, after the downfall of the Catholic King James II, was an almost insuperable obstacle to high office. For the same reason, he was passed over as Lord Chancellor of Ireland in 1697. His friendship with leading Catholics like Sir Toby Butler may also have counted against him: Butler, himself a former judge of the Tipperary Palatine Court as well as Solicitor-General for Ireland under James II, is said to have had much influence over him.

Despite the handicap of his mixed marriage, Meade was after all offered the office of Serjeant, after Lord Romney and the rest of the Dublin Government became deeply dissatisfied with the behaviour of the Prime Serjeant, John Osborne, who frequently acted without instructions from the Government, and at times went directly contrary to official policy. Meade refused the office on the ground that it would interfere with his flourishing private practice (although Hart notes that contemporary serjeants like Sir Richard Stephens became extremely rich through the perquisites of the office).

Lord Romney made it clear that his previous objection to appointing Meade to office had been no reflection on his character or reputation. In contrast to the "treacherous and ungrateful" Osborne, Romney remarked that Meade "has done very well, and is a man of most excellent parts: all the exception (objection) that can be made against him is that his wife is a Papist."

He was knighted in 1678 and made a baronet in 1703. He died in January 1707. He became a substantial landowner, with his main estate at Ballintubber.

== Family ==
Sir John married firstly Mary Coppinger, daughter of James Coppinger of Barryscourt Castle, County Cork; they had no children.

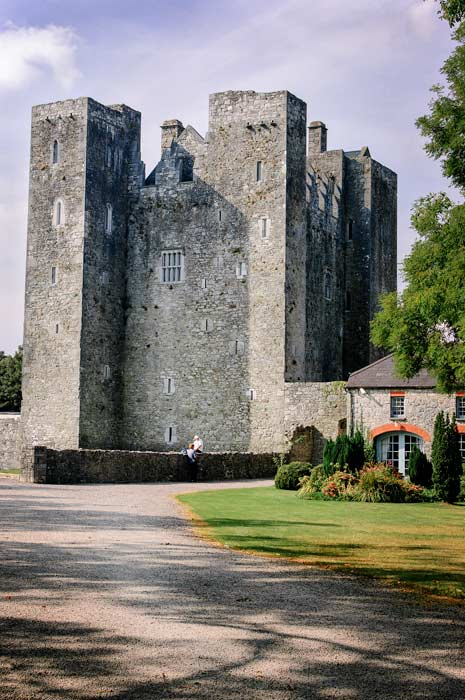
Barryscourt Castle, home of Meade's first wife Mary Coppinger

He married secondly Elizabeth Redman, daughter and co-heiress of Colonel Daniel Redman of Ballylinch, County Kilkenny and his wife Abigail Otway. Redman was a Cromwellian army officer, who had purchased substantial lands in Ireland from his brother-in-law Captain John Joyner, who had begun his career as a cook in the household of King Charles I of England, and later served as Mayor of Kilkenny. John and Elizabeth had one surviving daughter-

- Elizabeth, who married firstly Sir Ralph Freke, 1st Baronet, and secondly James King, 4th Baron Kingston and had children by both marriages. She died in 1750.

He married thirdly in 1688 Elizabeth Butler, daughter of Pierce Butler, 2nd Viscount Ikerrin and his wife Eleanor Bryan, daughter of John Bryan of Bawnmore, County Tipperary. The 2nd Lord Ikerrin was a convert to Protestantism but his son James, the 3rd Viscount (who married Eleanor Redman, sister of John Meade's second wife Elizabeth Redman) reverted to the Catholic faith, as did Elizabeth herself. Her Catholic beliefs were a barrier to her husband's career advancement. She died in 1757. They had at least eight children:

- two sons who died young
- Pierce, who succeeded his father as 2nd Baronet but died in 1711, at the age of 18;
- Richard, 3rd Baronet (1697-1744) from whom the Earls of Clanwilliam are descended;
- Helen, who married Richard Ponsonby of Crotto House, County Kerry, MP for Kinsale 1727–1760;
- Catherine, who married firstly Thomas Jones (died 1715), who was probably a grandson of Lewis Jones, Bishop of Killaloe, and secondly Nehemiah Donnellan, MP for County Tipperary, son of Nehemiah Donnellan, Chief Baron of the Irish Exchequer, by whom she had five children;
- Mary, who married Denis McCarthy of Cloghroe, County Cork, and had issue;
- Jane, who never married.

The Meade family acquired large estates in Cork and Tipperary, only to lose them all at the end of the eighteenth century through the extravagance of Sir John's grandson John Meade, 1st Earl of Clanwilliam.

== Sources ==
- Burke's Peerage 107th edition (2003)
- Cokayne Complete Peerage reissued Gloucester (2000)
- Debrett Complete Peerage 9th Edition (1814)
- Memoirs of Letitia Pilkington reissued by the University of Georgia 1999
- Gibney, John "Sir John Meade" Dictionary of Irish Biography Cambridge University Press
- Hart, A.R. History of the King's Serjeant-at-law in Ireland Four Courts Press Dublin 2000
- Norris, James Brewer History of Leinster: Embracing the Beauties of Dublin, Wicklow, Wexford, Kilkenny Taylor and Co. London 1829

== Notes ==
Parliament of Ireland
| Preceded by ??? | Member of Parliament for Dublin University; 1689–1692; With: Joseph Coghlan | Succeeded by Sir Cyril Wyche; William Molyneux |
| Preceded by ??? | Member of Parliament for County Tipperary; 1692–1707; With: Stephen Moore to 1703; James Dawson from 1703 | Succeeded by James Harrison; James Dawson |
Baronetage of Ireland
| New creation | Baronet (of Ballintubber); 1703–1707 | Succeeded by Pierce Meade |
