= Maria Wilhelmine von Thun und Hohenstein =

Viennese countess

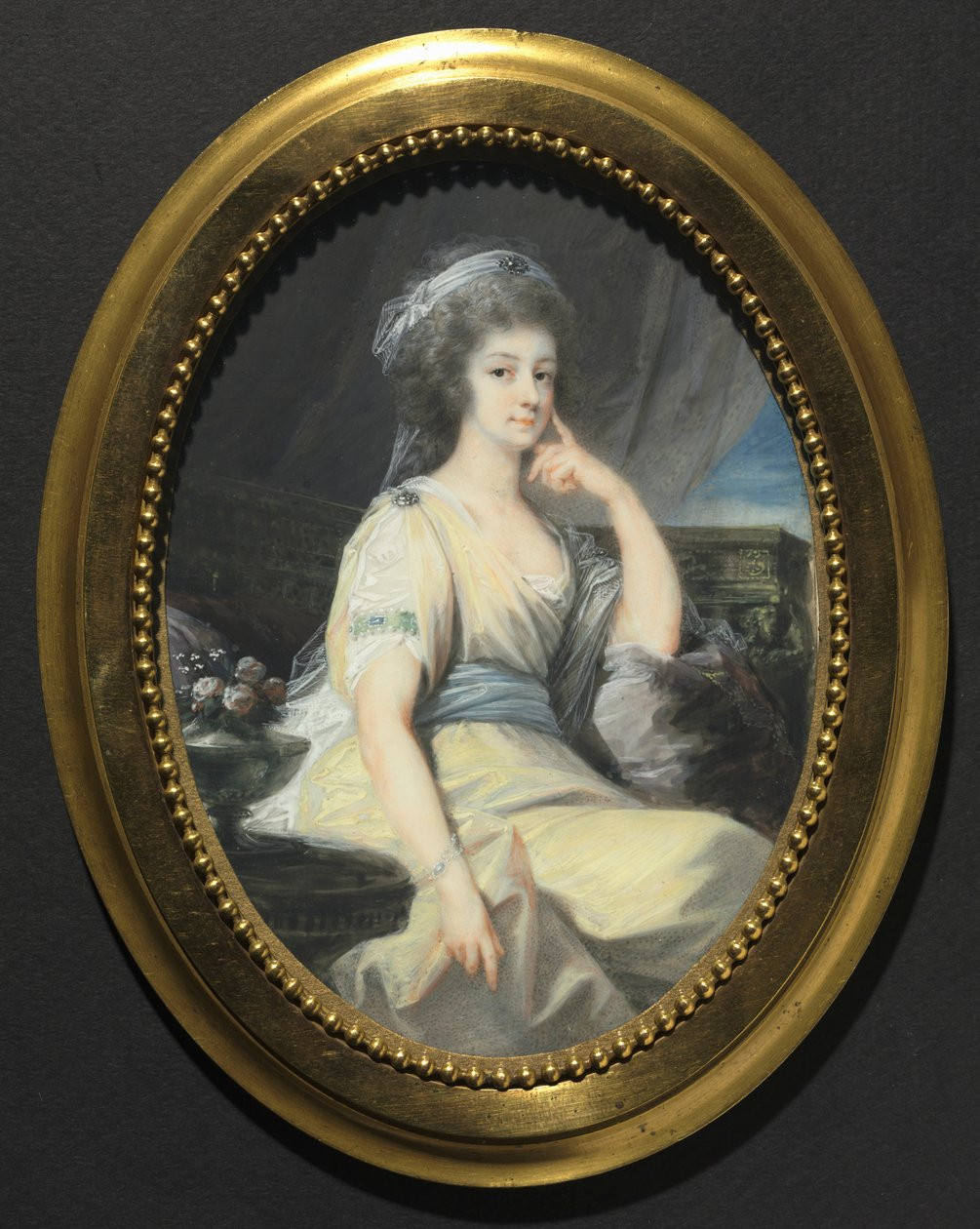
Countess Maria Wilhemine von Thun und Hohenstein, painted in 1790 by Heinrich Füger

Maria Wilhelmine von Thun und Hohenstein, born Uhlfeldt (Vienna 13 June 1744 – Vienna 18 May 1800) was a Viennese countess. She is remembered as the sponsor of a musically and intellectually outstanding salon and for her patronage of music, notably that of Mozart and Beethoven.

== Biography ==
Maria Wilhelmina Ulfeldt was the daughter of Imperial Count Anton Corfiz Ulfeldt (also spelled Uhlfeldt; 1699–1770), who "held several high political and court appointments" and his second wife, Princess Maria Elisabeth von Lobkowitz (1726–1786).

In the 1750s, the young Countess Uhlfeld studied keyboard with imperial court organist Wenzel Raimund Birck (1718–1763), a respected teacher and composer. A manuscript book of simple keyboard pieces and exercises that he prepared for her survives. Whether, as has been suggested, she also studied with Joseph Haydn is difficult to determine, since the source indicating this only gives the title "Countess Thun;" this name was also held by other women over time. The Countess evidently became a very skilled musician. The visiting English musicologist Charles Burney praised her harpsichord playing in print, saying that she "possesses as great skill in music as any person of distinction [i.e., aristocrat] I ever knew."

The salon that developed in her home is described by Clive as "a focal point of the musical and social life of the Viennese aristocracy."

She was a "fine pianist" and was a patron of both Mozart and Beethoven.

== Marriage and issue ==
On 30 July 1761, at the age 17, in Vienna, she married Count Franz Josef Anton von Thun und Hohenstein (1734–1801), who later became an Imperial Chamberlain. Together, they had six children, of whom four survived into adulthood:

- Maria Theresia (3 August 1762 – 1763)
- Maria Elisabeth (25 April 1764 – 1806) on 4 November 1788 married Prince Andrei Kyrillovich Razumovsky, member of the Razumovsky family, who became Russian ambassador in Vienna (1793–1799) and was a patron of Beethoven.
- Maria Christiane Josepha (25 July 1765 – 1841) on 24 November 1788 married Prince Karl Alois von Lichnowsky-Woschütz (Woszczyce) / (Czech) Karel Alois Lichnovský z Voštic / (polish) Książę Karol Alojzy Lichnowsky, member of the Lichnowsky family. He was as his mother-in-law Maria Wilhelmine of Thun and Hohenstein a patron of both Mozart and Beethoven.
- Ferdinand Joseph (29 August 1766 – 1768)
- Joseph Johann (5 December 1767 – 1810) succeeded his father as Count.
- Maria Carolina Anna, or Caroline, Countess Thun (19 May 1769 – 1800) married 16 October 1793 an Anglo Irish aristocrat, Lord Gillford, better known as Richard Meade, 2nd Earl of Clanwilliam (10 May 1766 – 3 September 1805), son of Theodosia Meade, Countess of Clanwilliam. The marriage caused a rift with her husband's protestant Irish Ascendancy family. She "excelled as a singer and guitarist". They had issue, one son Richard Charles Francis Christian Meade, 3rd Earl of Clanwilliam, and two daughters Caroline, Countess Széchenyi de Sárvár-Felsővidék (1794–1820) and Selina, Countess von Clam-Martinic (1797–1872) who married back into the Austrian aristocracy.

== Relations with Mozart and Beethoven ==
It is possible that Countess Thun first met Mozart in 1762, when she was 18 and he was seven; this was during an early concert tour of the Mozart family, carried out to display their children as musical prodigies; the young Mozart performed in her father's home. In 1781, when the 25-year-old Mozart moved permanently to Vienna to pursue his career, he and Thun became friends (they ate lunch together frequently). Mozart wrote of her to his father Leopold (24 March 1781), "[she is] the most charming and lovable lady I have ever met; and I am very high in her favor." He frequently performed in her home, and she lent him her excellent Stein piano when Mozart performed before the Emperor in competition with Muzio Clementi on 24 December 1781.

Thun may have played an essential role in Mozart's career when she arranged for him to perform extracts from his recent (1780) opera Idomeneo in her home before a set of guests that included Count Orsini-Rosenberg, the manager of the Imperial Theater. The Count "applauded warmly", and not long thereafter gave his agreement to the plans to commission Mozart for the opera Die Entführung aus dem Serail, which turned out (1782) to be his first great success in Vienna. As Mozart composed the work, Countess Thun listened with encouragement to each of three acts of the opera, performed on the piano by Mozart in her home, as he completed them.

According to Kenyon, "after 1782, [Thun] features less often in his activities." After Mozart's death in 1791, it is believed that she helped financially with the schooling of his two surviving sons.

She was the dedicatee of Beethoven's Piano Trio in B flat, Opus 11.
