= Richard Meade, 4th Earl of Clanwilliam =

Royal Navy Admiral of the Fleet (1832-1907)

Admiral of the Fleet The Right Honourable The Earl of Clanwilliam GCB KCMG
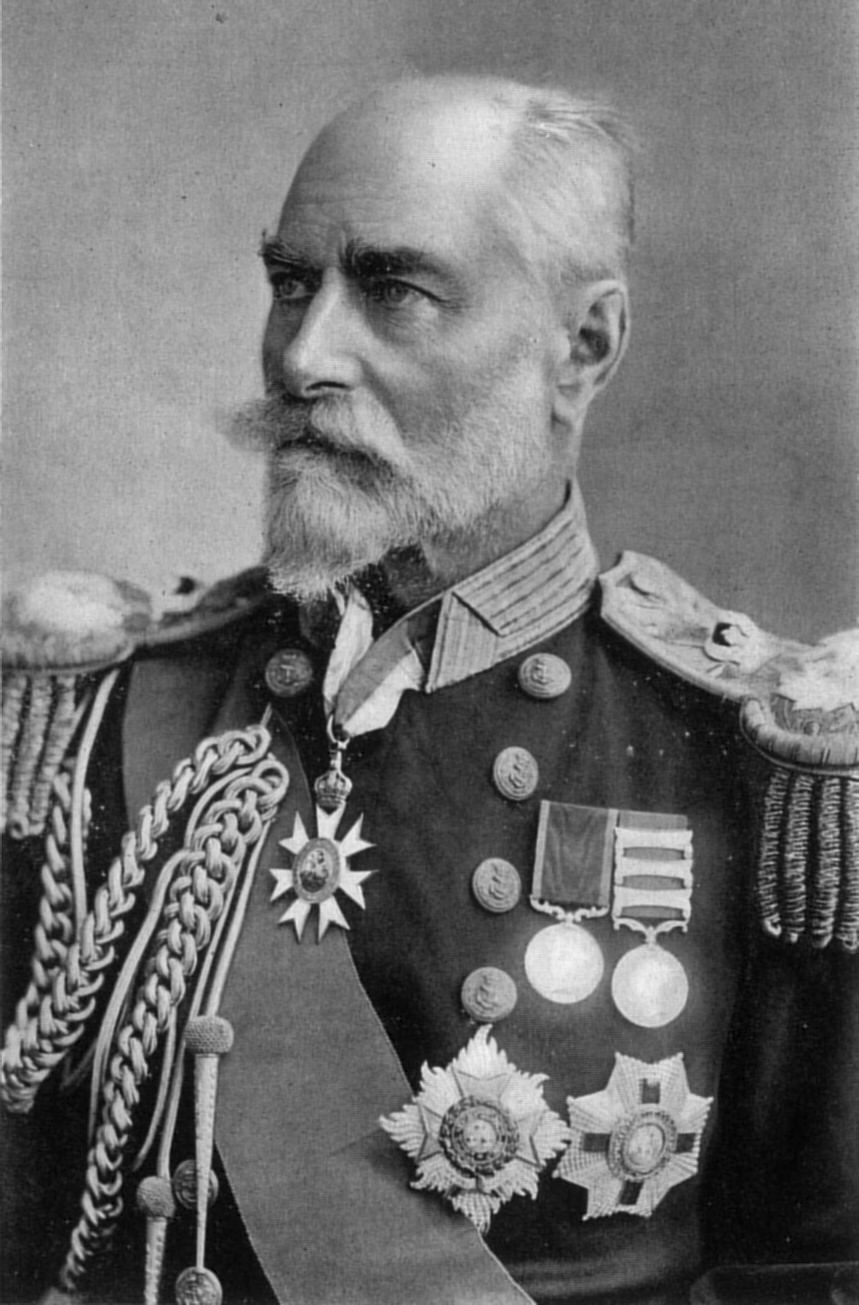
- The Earl of Clanwilliam
- Born: 3 October 1832
- Died: 4 August 1907 (aged 74); Badgemore House, Henley-on-Thames
- Burial place: Wilton, Wiltshire
- Education: Eton College
- Relatives: George Herbert (maternal grandfather); Richard Meade (Father); Lady Elizabeth Herbert (Mother)
- Military career
- Allegiance: United Kingdom
- Branch: Royal Navy
- Service years: 1845-1902
- Rank: Admiral of the Fleet
- Commands: HMS Tribune; HMS Hercules; Steamship reserve at Portsmouth; Flying Squadron; North America and West Indies Station; Portsmouth Command
- Conflicts: Crimean War; Second Opium War; Battle of Escape Creek; Battle of Fatshan Creek; Battle of Canton
- Awards: Knight Grand Cross of the Order of the Bath; Knight Commander of the Order of St Michael and St George

Admiral of the Fleet Richard James Meade, 4th Earl of Clanwilliam, GCB, KCMG (3 October 1832 – 4 August 1907), styled Lord Gillford until 1879, was a Royal Navy officer. As a junior officer, he served at the Battle of Escape Creek and at the Battle of Fatshan Creek during the campaign against Chinese pirates. He also took part in the Battle of Canton, where he was severely wounded, during the Second Opium War.

As a senior officer Meade went on to be commander of the Steamship reserve at Portsmouth, commander of the Flying Squadron and Commander-in-Chief, North America and West Indies Station. His last appointment was as Commander-in-Chief, Portsmouth.

== Early career ==
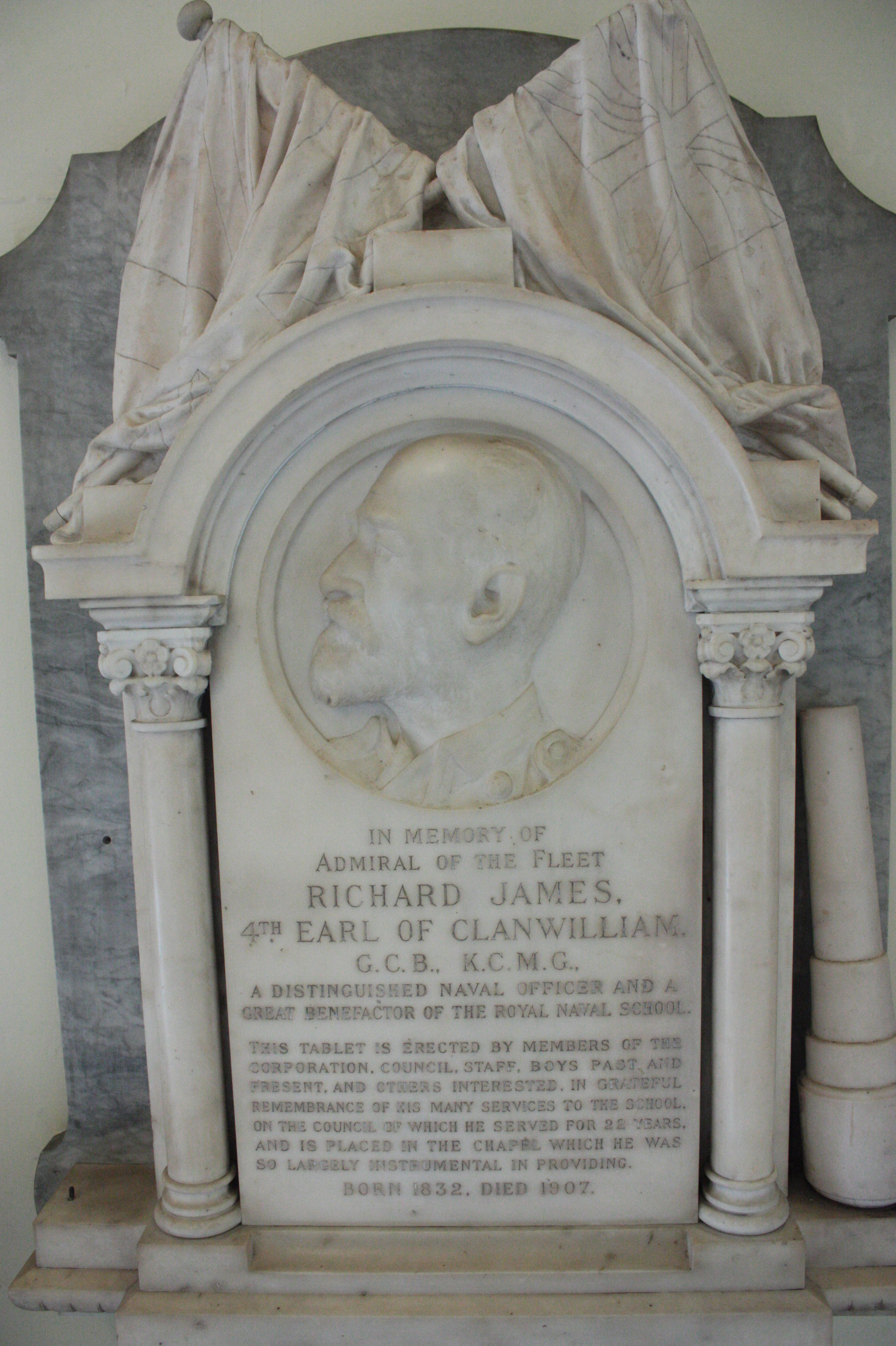
Memorial to Clanwilliam at the Chapel of the Old Naval College, Greenwich

Born the eldest son of Richard Meade, 3rd Earl of Clanwilliam and Lady Elizabeth Herbert (daughter of George Herbert, 11th Earl of Pembroke), Meade was educated at Eton College and joined the Royal Navy in November 1845. Promoted to lieutenant on 15 September 1852, Meade was appointed to the frigate HMS Impérieuse in which he served in the Baltic Sea during the Crimean War. He transferred to the frigate HMS Raleigh in September 1856 bound for China and, although the ship was wrecked near Hong Kong, all the crew survived. He served under Commodore Charles Elliot at the Battle of Escape Creek in May 1857 and under Commodore Henry Keppel at the Battle of Fatshan Creek in June 1857 during the campaign against Chinese pirates.

Meade transferred to the second-rate HMS Calcutta, flagship of the Commander-in-Chief, East Indies Station, in August 1857 and, having landed with the naval brigade, took part in the Battle of Canton in December 1857 during the Second Opium War: he was severely wounded in the left arm by a bullet fired from a gingal. He was mentioned in dispatches, promoted to commander on 26 February 1858 and transferred to the sloop HMS Hornet later that month.

Promoted to captain on 22 July 1859, Meade became commanding officer of the corvette HMS Tribune on the Pacific Station in 1862 and commanding officer of the battleship HMS Hercules in the Channel Fleet in 1868. He was appointed an aide-de-camp to the Queen and became commanding officer of the steamship reserve at Portsmouth in 1872.

== Senior command ==
Meade became Junior Naval Lord in the Second Disraeli ministry in May 1874 and, having been promoted to rear admiral on 31 December 1876, was appointed a Companion of the Order of the Bath on 2 June 1877. He succeeded to his father's titles in October 1879 and was elevated to Second Naval Lord in the same ministry in December 1879 where he sat until the Government fell in May 1880. He became commander of the Flying Squadron, with his flag in the frigate HMS Inconstant in August 1880, and was promoted to vice-admiral on 26 July 1881. However, while the squadron was in port at Sydney on 22 July, he "suffered a fainting fit, the attack resembling paralysis." The effects were severe enough to delay the departure of the squadron, planned for 24 July, to 10 August.

Meade was appointed a Knight Commander of the Order of St Michael and St George on 3 March 1882 and became Commander-in-Chief, North America and West Indies Station, with his flag in the central battery ship HMS Bellerophon, in August 1885. Promoted to full admiral on 22 June 1886, he was advanced to Knight Commander of the Order of the Bath on 21 June 1887.

Meade was appointed a commissioner of the Royal Patriotic Fund Corporation in 1888 and became Commander-in-Chief, Portsmouth in June 1891. Promoted to Admiral of the Fleet on 20 February 1895, he was advanced to Knight Grand Cross of the Order of the Bath on 25 May 1895.

He retired in October 1902 and died at his home, Badgemore House, near Henley-on-Thames from pneumonia on 4 August 1907. He was buried at the family vault at Wilton, Wiltshire and his titles passed to his eldest surviving son, Arthur.

== Memorials ==
A memorial to Meade stands in the entrance lobby of the chapel at the Old Royal Naval College in Greenwich, south-east London.

== Family ==
On 17 June 1867 Meade married Elizabeth Kennedy (the eldest daughter of Sir Arthur Kennedy); they had four sons and four daughters:

- Richard Charles Meade, Baron Gillford (1868–1905), who married 1895 Lady Mary Elizabeth Margaret Douglas-Home (1871–1951), daughter of Charles Douglas-Home, 12th Earl of Home. He died before his father, leaving a daughter:
  - Theodosia Beatrix Catherina Mary Meade (b.1898), who married Angus Julian Drummond.
- Lady Elizabeth Selina Georgiana Meade (1869–1924), who married in 1898 Captain Hon. Edward Stanley Dawson (1843–1919), younger son of Richard Dawson, 1st Earl of Dartrey. They left a daughter Kaitlin Elizabeth Anne Dawson (1900–1985), who married George Bingham, 6th Earl of Lucan.
- Lady Katharine Meade (1871−1954), a Lady-in-Waiting to the Duchess of Albany between 1910 and 1922, then to the Duchess of York between 1923 and 1926.
- Arthur Vesey Meade, 5th Earl of Clanwilliam (1873–1953).
- Lady Beatrice Meade (1874–1952).
- Admiral Hon. Sir Herbert Meade (1875–1964), a Royal Navy officer who adopted the surname Meade-Fetherstonhaugh; he married in 1911 Margaret Isabel Frances Glyn (1888–1977), daughter of Rev. Edward Carr Glyn, leaving four children including John Meade, 7th Earl of Clanwilliam.
- Lady Adelaide Jane Meade (1877–1960), who married in 1902, Admiral Hon. Sir Stanley Colville (1861–1939), son of Charles Colville, 1st Viscount Colville of Culross, and left children.
- Captain Hon. Edward Brabazon Meade (1878–1963), an officer in the 10th Royal Hussars, who married three times, leaving no children.

== Sources ==
- Heathcote, Tony (2002). The British Admirals of the Fleet 1734 – 1995. Pen & Sword Ltd. ISBN 0-85052-835-6.

Military offices
Preceded by Sir Beauchamp Seymour	Junior Naval Lord; 1874–1879	Succeeded by Sir John Commerell
Preceded by Sir Arthur Hood	Second Naval Lord; 1879–1880	Succeeded by Lord John Hay
Preceded by Sir John Commerell	Commander-in-Chief, North America and West Indies Station; 1885–1886	Succeeded by Sir Algernon Lyons
Preceded by Sir John Commerell	Commander-in-Chief, Portsmouth; 1891–1894	Succeeded by Sir Nowell Salmon
Peerage of Ireland
Preceded by Richard Meade	Earl of Clanwilliam; 1879–1909	Succeeded by Arthur Meade
