= Sir Richard Meade, 3rd Baronet =

Anglo-Irish politician (1697–1744)

Sir Richard Meade, 3rd Baronet Bt

Member of Parliament for Kinsale
- In office 1725–1744
- Preceded by: Anthony Stawell
- Succeeded by: Jonas Stawell

Personal details
- Born: 1697
- Died: 26 May 1744 (aged 46–47)
- Spouse: Catherine Prittie
- Relations: Father: Sir John Meade, 1st Baronet; Son: John Meade, 1st Earl of Clanwilliam
- Education: Trinity College Dublin

Sir Richard Meade, 3rd Baronet (1697 – 26 May 1744) was an Anglo-Irish politician.

Meade was the second eldest surviving son of Sir John Meade, 1st Baronet and Hon. Elizabeth Butler. He was a graduate of Trinity College Dublin.

He sat in the Irish House of Commons as the Member of Parliament for Kinsale from 1725 until his death in 1744.

In July 1711 he succeeded to his elder brother's baronetcy. In 1736 Meade married Catherine Prittie, daughter of Henry Prittie and Elizabeth Harrison. He was succeeded in his title by his eldest son John Meade, who was raised to the Peerage of Ireland in 1766.

Parliament of Ireland
Preceded by Anthony Stawell; Edward Southwell	Member of Parliament for Kinsale; 1725–1744; With: Edward Southwell (1725); Richard Ponsonby (1725–1744)	Succeeded by Jonas Stawell; Richard Ponsonby
Baronetage of Ireland
Preceded by Pierce Meade	Baronet (of Ballintubber); 1711–1744	Succeeded by John Meade
