= Herbert Meade-Fetherstonhaugh =

Royal Navy Admiral (1875-1964)

Admiral Sir Herbert Meade-Fetherstonhaugh GCVO CB DSO
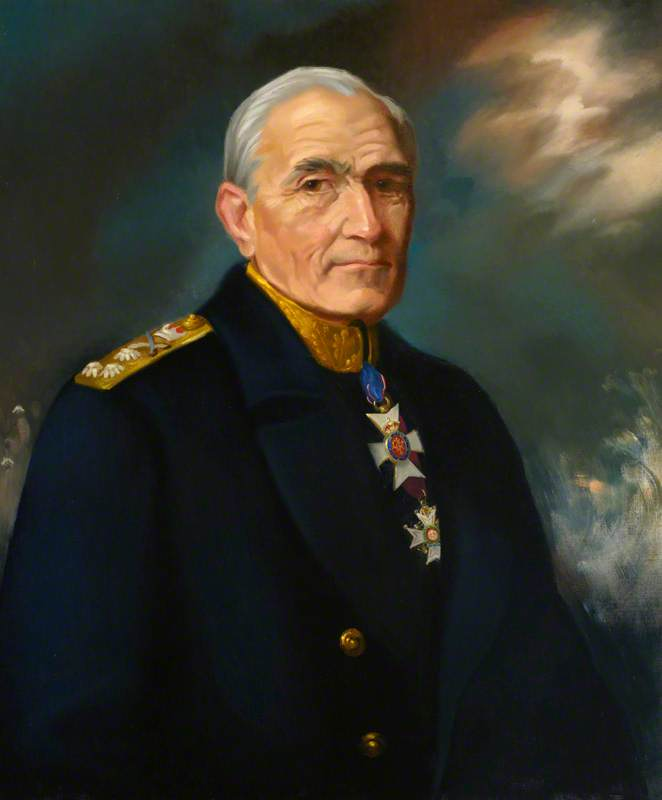
- Meade-Fetherstonhaugh in 1940, by Oswald Birley
- Born: Herbert Meade; 3 November 1875; London
- Died: 27 October 1964 (aged 88)
- Spouse: Margaret Isabel Frances Glyn (m. 1911)
- Father: Richard Meade, 4th Earl of Clanwilliam
- Relatives: John Meade, 7th Earl of Clanwilliam (son)
- Military career
- Allegiance: United Kingdom
- Branch: Royal Navy
- Service years: c.1897–1936
- Rank: Admiral
- Commands: HMS Goshawk; HMS Royalist; HMS Ceres; HMS Renown; Britannia Royal Naval College
- Conflicts: First World War; Battle of Heligoland Bight; Battle of Jutland; Second Battle of Heligoland Bight

Admiral Sir Herbert Meade-Fetherstonhaugh, GCVO, CB, DSO (né Meade; 3 November 1875 – 27 October 1964) was a British admiral in the Royal Navy.

== Biography ==
He was born in London as Herbert Meade, the third son of the then Baron Gillford, who later became, in 1879, The 4th Earl of Clanwilliam, later Admiral of the Fleet, and Elizabeth Henrietta Kennedy. He adopted the additional surname of Fetherstonhaugh by Royal Licence in 1931.

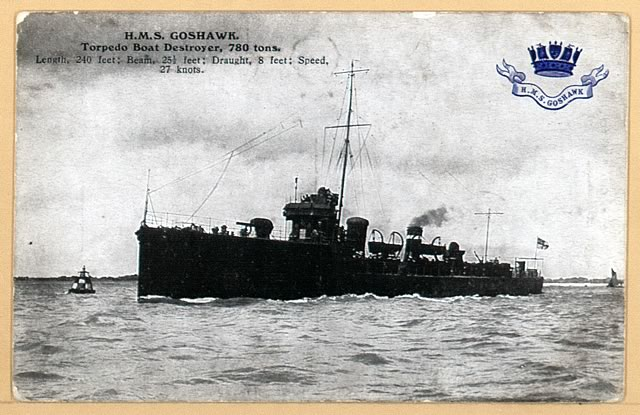
HMS Goshawk depicted on a pre-World War I postcard

He joined the Royal Navy and was promoted lieutenant in 1897. In November 1902, he was posted to the battleship HMS Venerable, as she received its first commission going to the Mediterranean Fleet. He was promoted to commander in 1908 and captain in 1914. In 1912 he was given command of HMS Goshawk which took part in the Battle of Heligoland in 1914 and was instrumental in the sinking of the German destroyer V187. He was in command of the light cruisers HMS Royalist at the Battle of Jutland in 1916 and HMS Ceres at the Second Battle of Heligoland Bight in 1917.

From April 1918 to April 1919 he was the Naval Assistant to the Second Sea Lord and then took command for a short time of the battlecruiser HMS Renown before being appointed for three years as Captain of the Royal Naval College, Dartmouth (1923–26). In 1924 he was also appointed Naval Aide-de-Camp to the king.

He was made a Commander of the Royal Victorian Order (CVO) in July 1922, a Companion of the Order of the Bath (CB) in the 1925 Birthday Honours and advanced to Knight Commander of the Royal Victorian Order (KCVO) in May 1929. He was promoted to vice-admiral on 8 May 1930 and in 1931 given the post of Vice-Admiral Commanding H.M. Yachts, a position he held until December 1934. He was promoted to the rank of admiral on 31 July 1934, advanced to Knight Grand Gross of the Royal Victorian Order (GCVO) in the 1925 New Year Honours and retired at his own request in July 1936.

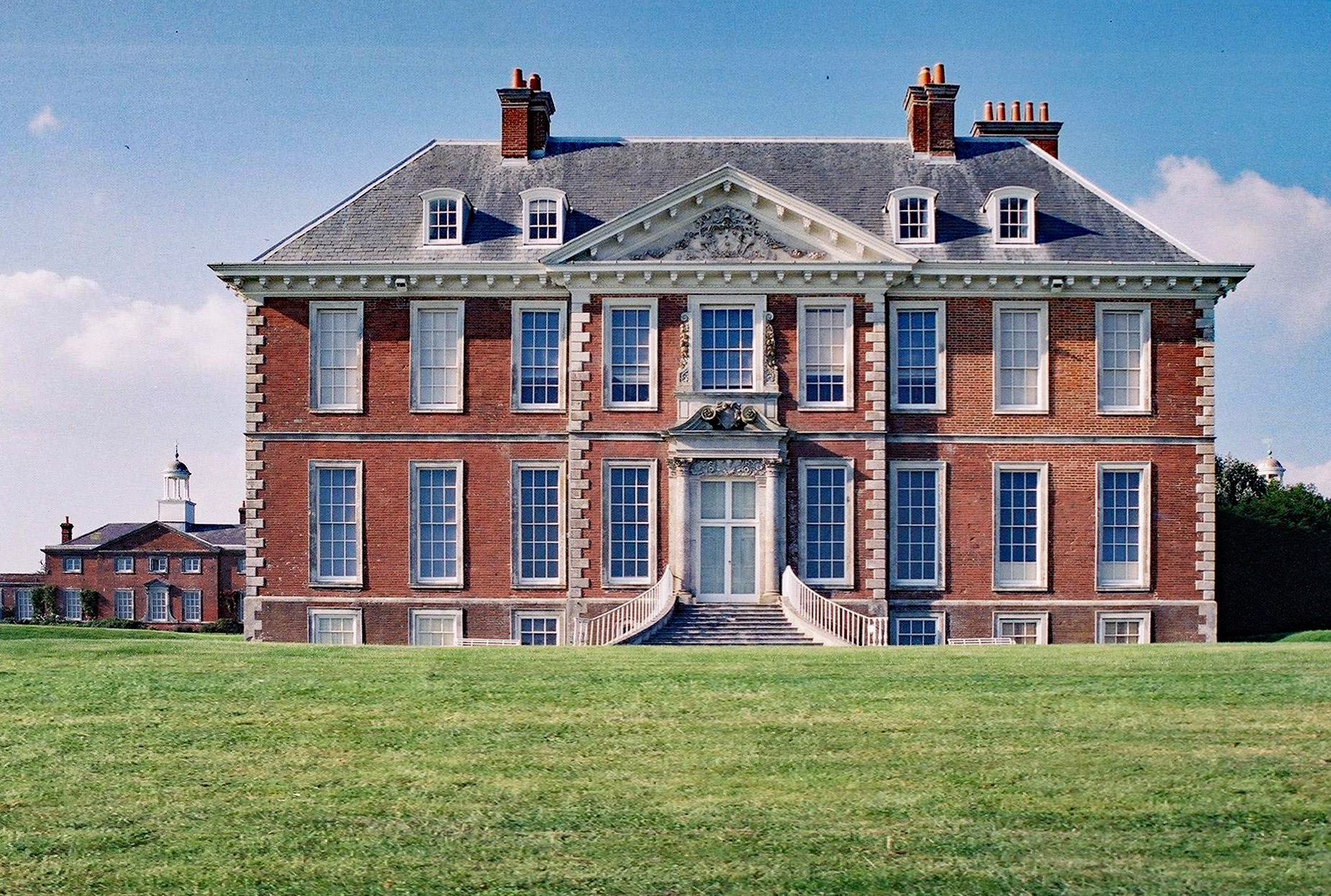
Uppark, Sussex

From 1939 to 1946 he was Serjeant-at-Arms of the House of Lords.

He died in 1964. He had married in 1911 Margaret Isabel Frances Glyn, the daughter of the Rt. Rev. Hon. Edward Carr Glyn, the Bishop of Peterborough and had 2 sons and 2 daughters. The youngest son, John Herbert Meade, succeeded his cousin as the 7th Earl Clanwilliam. The family lived at Uppark, West Sussex, a grand 17th-century house which the admiral inherited in 1930. The house is now owned by the National Trust.
