= Banagher (Parliament of Ireland constituency) =

Pre-1801 Irish constituency

- Former borough constituency for the Irish House of Commons
- County: King's County
- Borough: Banagher

1629–1801
- Seats: 2
- Replaced by: Disfranchised

Banagher was a constituency represented in the Irish House of Commons until 1800.

== History ==
Banagher had two members in the 1689 Patriot Parliament summoned by King James II.

== Members of Parliament, 1629–1801 ==
- 1634–1635 Sir Edward Bagshawe and Richard Pigott
- 1639–1649 Thomas Little (expelled and replaced by Robert Smith) and Jacob Lovell (died and replaced 1642 by James Laughlyn. Laughlyn died and was replaced 1645 by Sir Robert Dixon)
- 1661–1666 Colonel Carey Dillon, later 5th Earl of Roscommon and Sir William Gore, 3rd Baronet

=== 1689–1801 ===
Election	First MP		Second MP
1689	Terence Coghlan		Terence Coghlan
1692	Thomas Lestrange		William Sprigge
1703	Thomas Lestrange		George Eyre
1711	Thomas Lestrange		Charles Patrick Plunket
1713	Peter Holmes		Charles Patrick Plunket
1715	Thomas Lestrange		Charles Patrick Plunket
1727	George Holmes		Charles Patrick Plunket
1729	George Holmes		William Sprigge
1734	Galbraith Holmes (Note: Declared not duly elected in 1735)		William Sprigge
November 1735	Galbraith Holmes		Robert Holmes
December 1735	Richard Trench		Henry Lestrange
1761	Peter Holmes		John Pigott
1764	Peter Holmes		Sir John Meade, 4th Bt
1767	Peter Holmes		Henry Prittie
1768	Peter Holmes		Thomas Coghlan
1776	Peter Holmes		James Cavendish
1783	Peter Holmes		Richard Malone
1785	Peter Holmes		Edward Bellingham Swan
1790	Edward Hoare		John Metge
January 1798	John Brabazon Ponsonby (Note: Also elected for Dungarvan in 1798, for which he chose to sit)		John Metge
1798	John Brabazon Ponsonby		Arthur Dawson
1798	John Metge (Note: Also elected for Tallow in 1798, for which he chose to sit)		Arthur Dawson
1798	Edward Hoare		Arthur Dawson
1800	John Philpot Curran	Patriot	Arthur Dawson
1801	Disenfranchised		

== Bibliography ==
- O'Hart, John (2007). The Irish and Anglo-Irish Landed Gentry: When Cromwell came to Ireland. Vol. II. Heritage Books. ISBN 0-7884-1927-7.
- Leigh Rayment's historical List of Members of the Irish House of Commons. Cites: Johnston-Liik, Edith Mary (2002). The History of the Irish Parliament 1692-1800 (6 volumes). Ulster Historical Foundation.
