= James Cavendish (Irish MP) =

Anglo-Irish politician

James Cavendish (circa 1749 – January 1808) was an Anglo-Irish politician.

Cavendish sat in the Irish House of Commons as the Member of Parliament for Lifford between 1773 and 1776, before sitting for Banagher from 1776 to 1783.

Parliament of Ireland
Preceded by Abraham Creighton; John Creighton	Member of Parliament for Lifford; 1773–1776; With: Abraham Creighton	Succeeded by Abraham Creighton; Sir Nicholas Lawless, Bt
Preceded by Peter Holmes; Thomas Coghlan	Member of Parliament for Banagher; 1776–1783; With: Peter Holmes	Succeeded by Peter Holmes; Richard Malone
