= Theodosia Meade, Countess of Clanwilliam =

English heiress and landowner (1743–1817)

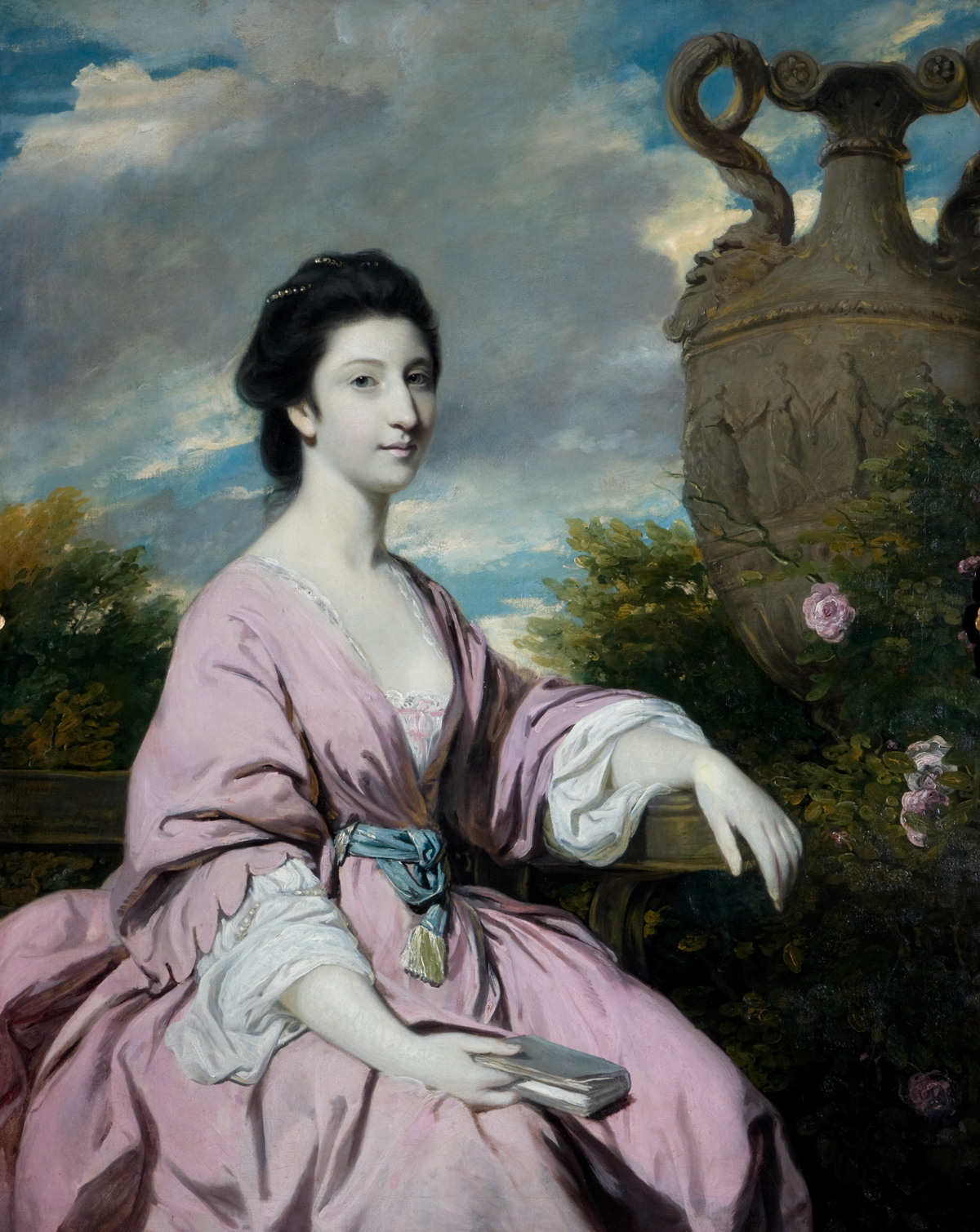
Theodosia Meade, Countess of Clanwilliam (Miss Hawkins-Magill) by Joshua Reynolds

Theodosia Hawkins-Magill (5 September 1743 in Brighton – 2 March 1817 in Brighton), later Countess of Clanwilliam, was a great heiress and landowner in County Down, Ireland.

== Early life ==
Theodosia Hawkins-Magill was born on 5 September 1743 in Brighton. She was the daughter and heir of Robert Hawkins-Magill (d. 10 April 1745), of Gill Hall, Dromore, County Down, by his second wife, Anne Bligh, daughter of John Bligh, 1st Earl of Darnley and Theodosia Bligh, 10th Baroness Clifton. Her father died on 10 April 1745, when she was less than two years old and she inherited his fortune. Her mother remarried in December 1747, to Bernard Ward, and had a number of further children. Mrs Pendarves wrote of Bernard Ward and the former Lady Anne Hawkins-Magill: 'He wants taste and Lady Anne is so whimsical that I doubt her judgement'.

Theodosia may have been called "Titty" by her family, as this was a pet name used for Theodosia's aunt, Lady Theodosia Bligh, who married William, 2nd Lord Brandon, in 1745.

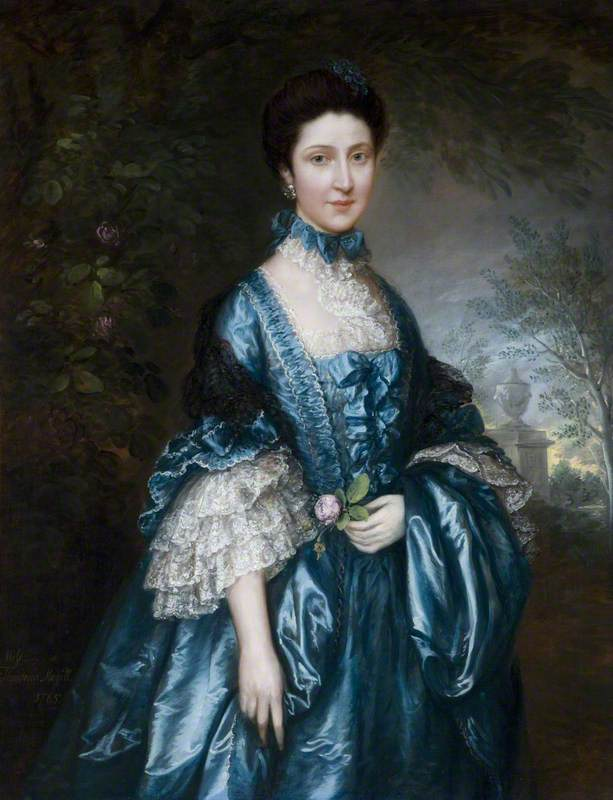
Theodosia Clanwilliam by Thomas Gainsborough, 50 x 40 inches

When young, Theodosia Hawkins-Magill was painted by both Reynolds and Gainsborough, both paintings are now held by the Ulster Museum.

== Marriage and family ==
On 29 August 1765 Theodosia Hawkins-Magill married John Meade (21 April 1744 – 19 October 1800, St. Stephen's Green, Dublin), son and heir of Sir Richard Meade, 3rd Baronet, of Ballintober, Co. Cork, by Catherine, daughter of Henry Prittie, of Kilboy, Co. Tipperary. She was then known as Theodosia Meade.

Her husband was Member of Parliament for Banagher between 1764–66. On 17 November 1766 as Sir John Meade, 4th Baronet, he was created Baron Gillford, of the manor of Gillford, Co. Down, and Viscount Clanwilliam, of Co. Tipperary. Nearly a decade later, on 20 July 1776 he became Earl of Clanwilliam; all in the peerage of Ireland. This gave Theodosia the title of Countess of Clanwilliam, and was called Lady Clanwilliam.

Between them (hers being the far greater share) their estates in 1799 were said to be worth £14,000 per annum, which made them approximately the eleventh largest landowners in Ireland. Theodosia had strong terms to her marriage settlement that prevented her husband from accessing and selling her estates. He was profligate and built up significant debts despite his wealth, owing £72,135 by 1787, and by his death in 1800 his estate had reduced considerably to service these debts.

Between 1766 and 1782, the couple had ten children.

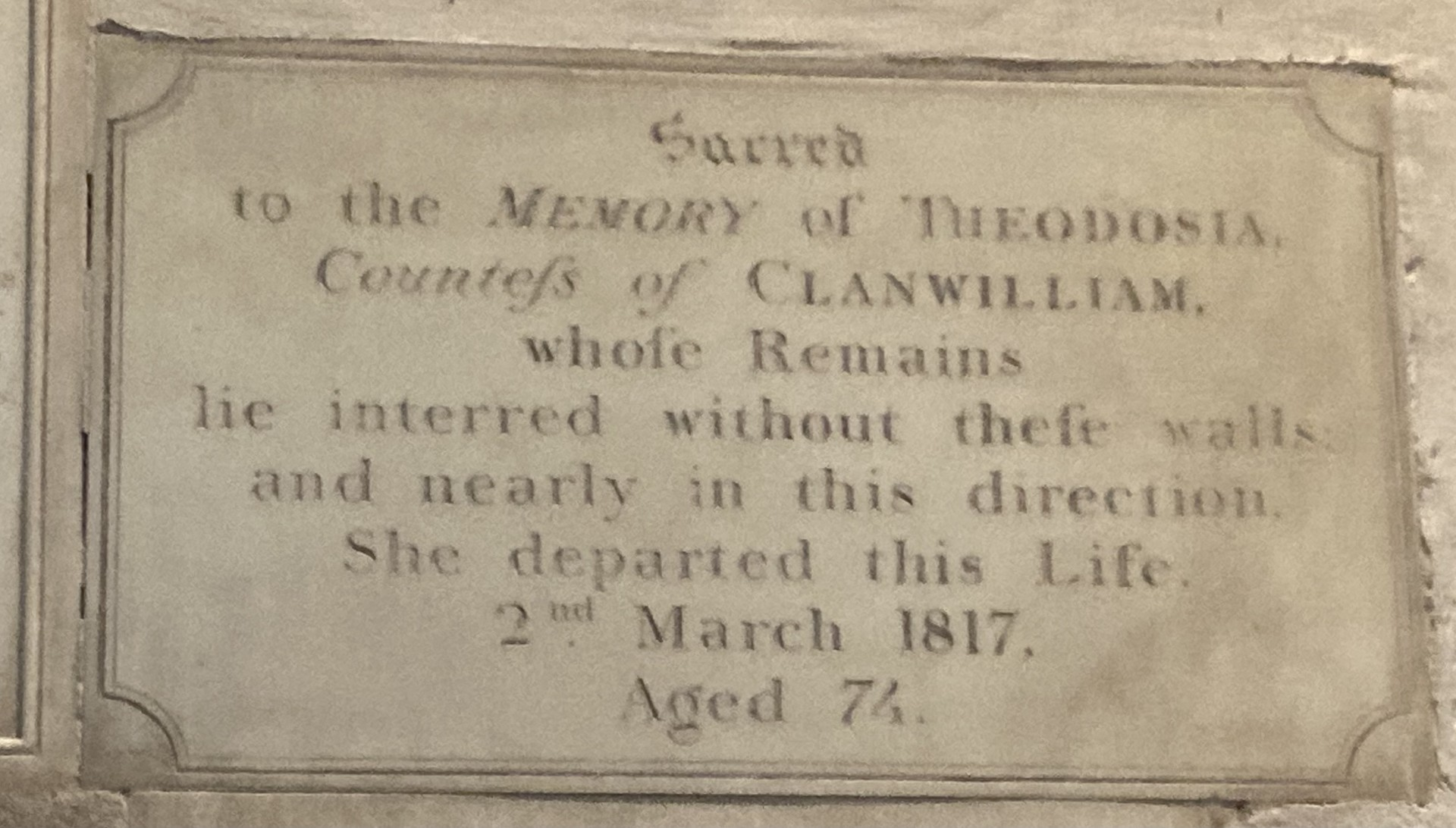
Theodosia, Countess of Clanwilliam's memorial stone at St Peter's Church, Preston Village, Brighton

Theodosia Meade, Countess of Clanwilliam died on 2 March 1817 and was buried in the cemetery of St Peter's Church, Preston Village.

== Politics ==
Despite the fact that women would not have the vote for another two centuries, rich and influential women could have significant political influence. Lady Clanwilliam's family, the Magills, had a long history of representing Co. Down in parliament in the late 1600s and early 1700, and she promoted her sons' political careers to continue the tradition. In October 1793 she announced that her absent eldest son Lord Gilford would stand for the Down by-election, but he was not elected and soon fell out with his mother after he married Countess Caroline Thun, daughter of Maria Wilhelmine von Thun und Hohenstein, of a Catholic Austrian aristocratic family. The Clanwilliams were a prominent protestant Ascendancy family, strongly opposed to Catholic emancipation in Ireland, and the marriage caused a rift.

== Heraldic note ==
- Hawkins of Rathfriland (Alderman Hawkins (d.1680): per chevron argent and vert three hinds trippant proper.

crest: a falcon rising proper, belled or, perched on a lure gold.
motto: providence with adventure (also for Hawkins' in Scotland).

- Magill (for John Mac Gill, died 1677): azure three doves argent.

(cf. Makgill/M'Gill/Mac Gill (of Kembach/Rankeillour, Fife): gules three martlets argent.

motto: In Domino confido. crest: a martlet argent).

- Hawkins Magill (for John (formerly Hawkins) Magill 1701): quarterly 1st and 4th, azure three pewits argent (for Magill), 2nd and 3rd per chevron argent and vert three hinds trippant (for Hawkins).

crest: a falcon standing on a hawk's lure both proper argent and vert.

- Meade (of Ballintobber): gules, a chevron ermine between three trefoils slipped argent;

crest: an eagle displayed with two heads sable, armed or.

motto: Toujours prest.

- Meade (of Earsham and Burrenwood):

quarterly, 1st and 4th, grand quarters, gules, a chevron ermine between three trefoils slipped argent (Meade); 2nd and 3rd, grand quarters, quarterly 1st and 4th, azure, three peewits argent (Magill); 2nd and 3rd, per chevron and vert, three hinds trippant proper (Hawkins) a crest for difference.
Mantling: gules and argent.

== Ancestry ==
Some of Theodosia's ancestors
| Theodosia Hawkins Magill | Robert Hawkins-Magill (1704–1745). MP. (married 1st (1728) Rachael (d.1739), widow (married 1699) of Randal Mac Donnell, 4th Earl of Antrim (1680-1721); daughter of Clotworthy Skeffington, 3rd Viscount Massereene; and granddaughter of Sir Edward Hungerford, KB.) | Paternal Grandfather: John Hawkins Magill (1675-5 Sept. 1713) MP County Down 1703–13. | John Hawkins, of Rathfriland. High Sheriff 1675. Son of Alderman (William) Hawkins (d.1680) of London, Dublin and Rathfriland Castle. |
| Theodosia Hawkins Magill | Robert Hawkins-Magill (1704–1745). MP. (married 1st (1728) Rachael (d.1739), widow (married 1699) of Randal Mac Donnell, 4th Earl of Antrim (1680-1721); daughter of Clotworthy Skeffington, 3rd Viscount Massereene; and granddaughter of Sir Edward Hungerford, KB.) | Paternal Grandfather: John Hawkins Magill (1675-5 Sept. 1713) MP County Down 1703–13. | Mary, daughter of Lt. William Johnston, (by his wife Susanna only child of Captain John Mac Gill of Gill Hall (d.1677)), & sister of Sir John Magill, Bt. (d.1700) |
| Theodosia Hawkins Magill | Robert Hawkins-Magill (1704–1745). MP. (married 1st (1728) Rachael (d.1739), widow (married 1699) of Randal Mac Donnell, 4th Earl of Antrim (1680-1721); daughter of Clotworthy Skeffington, 3rd Viscount Massereene; and granddaughter of Sir Edward Hungerford, KB.) | Paternal Grandmother: Rose Colville. They married 17 August 1697. | Sir Robert Colville (1625–1697), of Newtown, Co. Down and Mount Colvill (Galgorm Parks), Ballymena, co. Antrim. He bought the Abbey of Kells. MP. Rose Leslie was the third of his four wives. |
| Theodosia Hawkins Magill | Robert Hawkins-Magill (1704–1745). MP. (married 1st (1728) Rachael (d.1739), widow (married 1699) of Randal Mac Donnell, 4th Earl of Antrim (1680-1721); daughter of Clotworthy Skeffington, 3rd Viscount Massereene; and granddaughter of Sir Edward Hungerford, KB.) | Paternal Grandmother: Rose Colville. They married 17 August 1697. | Rose, daughter of William Leslie, of Coleraine, and of Prospect, Co. Antrim. MP & a Deputy-Governor. He was third son of Bishop Henry Leslie. |
| Theodosia Hawkins Magill | Lady Anne Bligh. (aka Viscountess Ward). | Maternal Grandfather: John Bligh, 1st Earl of Darnley (1687–1728) | Thomas Bligh (1654–1710), of Rathmore, Co. Meath. |
| Theodosia Hawkins Magill | Lady Anne Bligh. (aka Viscountess Ward). | Maternal Grandfather: John Bligh, 1st Earl of Darnley (1687–1728) | Elizabeth Naper, of Loughcrew, Co. Meath |
| Theodosia Hawkins Magill | Lady Anne Bligh. (aka Viscountess Ward). | Maternal Grandmother: Lady Theodosia Hyde, suo jure Baroness Clifton of Leighton Bromswold | Edward Hyde, Viscount Cornbury, 3rd Earl of Clarendon (1661–1723) |
| Theodosia Hawkins Magill | Lady Anne Bligh. (aka Viscountess Ward). | Maternal Grandmother: Lady Theodosia Hyde, suo jure Baroness Clifton of Leighton Bromswold | Catherine O'Brien, suo jure Baroness Clifton of Leighton Bromswold (1673–1706). Of Cobham Hall, Kent. Granddaughter of George, 9th Seigneur d'Aubigny (k. 1642), and niece of Charles, 6th Duke of Lennox (d.1672). |
