= Pierce Meade =

Irish Anglican priest (1776–1834)

Pierce Meade (21 November 1776 - 22 November 1834) was an Anglican priest in Ireland in the early 19th century.

The fifth son of John Meade, 1st Earl of Clanwilliam he was Archdeacon of Dromore from 1810 until 1832.
