= Richard Meade, 3rd Earl of Clanwilliam =

British diplomat and politician (1795–1879)

The Right Honorable The Earl of Clanwilliam
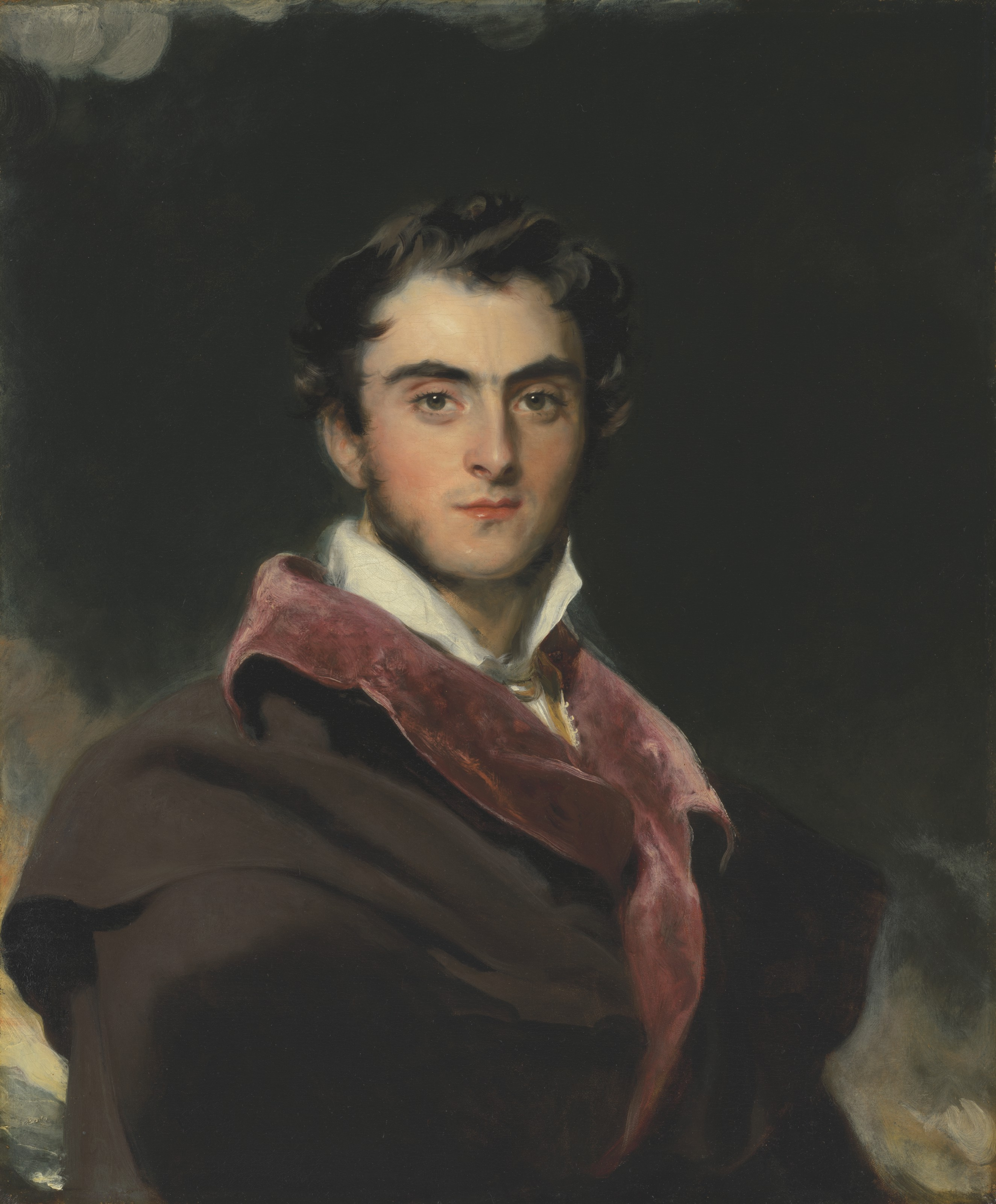
- Portrait of Lord Clanwilliam by Thomas Lawrence, 1819

Under-Secretary of State for Foreign Affairs
- In office 1822–1823

Envoy to Berlin
- In office February 1823 – December 1827

Earl of Clanwilliam
- In office 1805 – 7 October 1879
- Preceded by: Richard Meade, 2nd Earl of Clanwilliam
- Succeeded by: Richard Meade, 4th Earl of Clanwilliam

Baron Clanwilliam
- In office 28 January 1828 – 7 October 1879

Personal details
- Born: 15 August 1795 Dublin, Ireland
- Died: 7 October 1879 (aged 84) London, United Kingdom
- Spouse: Lady Elizabeth Herbert (m. 1830; died 1858)
- Children: 5, including Richard and Robert
- Parents: Richard Meade, 2nd Earl of Clanwilliam; Caroline, Countess Thun
- Occupation: diplomatist

Richard Charles Francis Christian Meade, 3rd Earl of Clanwilliam GCH (15 August 1795 – 7 October 1879), styled Lord Gillford between 1800 and 1805, was a British diplomat and politician of Anglo-Irish background. A protégée of the British Foreign Secretary Lord Castlereagh he played an active role in the Concert of Europe in the post-Napoleonic era.

== Background and education ==
Meade was the only son of Richard Meade, 2nd Earl of Clanwilliam, and his Austrian wife, Countess Caroline von Thun und Hohenstein, and succeeded in the earldom at the age of ten. His early years were spent in Vienna, where his father had moved after a series of bitter quarrels with his own parents about his marriage and about their enormous debts, which deprived him of what should have been a great inheritance. After his father's death Richard was raised by relatives in England. He was educated at Eton.

In his 1848 memoirs, François-René de Chateaubriand writes of Meade that "at the head of the younger [London dandies of the 1820s] . . . Lord Clanwilliam was prominent, the son, it was said, of the Duc de Richelieu. He did wonderful things: he rode his horse to Richmond and returned to Almack's having fallen off twice. He had a certain trick of speaking in the manner of Alcibiades, which delighted."

== Diplomatic and political career ==
Lord Clanwilliam joined the Diplomatic Service. He attended Lord Castlereagh's suite at the Congress of Vienna in 1814 and was his private secretary from January 1817 to July 1819 in the latter's capacity as Foreign Secretary. He was one of the first people to see Castlereagh's widow after his suicide. It was he who was largely responsible for the decision to give Lord Castlereagh an official funeral in Westminster Abbey. He was one of many witnesses who later testified to Castlereagh's increasingly strange mental condition in the days before his suicide.

He was formally appointed Under-Secretary of State for Foreign Affairs in 1822 after having acted in this role for a year and a half. However, he shortly thereafter resigned this role to become chef de chancellerie to the Duke of Wellington's mission at the Congress of Verona. He served as Envoy to Berlin from February 1823 to December 1827. In 1826 he was created grand cross of the Royal Guelphic Order and in 1828 Baron Clanwilliam, of Clanwilliam in the County of Tipperary, in the Peerage of the United Kingdom.

He was conferred a Doctor of Civil Law from Oxford University in 1834. In 1847 he was awarded the honorary position of Captain of Deal Castle, which he held until his death. He died at 32 Belgrave Square in London on 7 October 1879. His papers are held by the Public Record Office of Northern Ireland.

== Family ==
Lord Clanwilliam married Lady Elizabeth Herbert (1809–1858), daughter of George Herbert, 11th Earl of Pembroke and his Russian wife Catherine Vorontsov on 3 July 1830; the couple had one daughter and four sons. He was brother in law of the Russian general Mikhail Vorontsov.

He was succeeded by his eldest son, Richard. His second son, Sir Robert Henry Meade, later achieved distinction as Permanent Under-Secretary of the Colonial Office. His second youngest son Sidney Meade (1839-1917) was Perpetual Curate of Christ Church in Bradford on Avon from 1882, Canon of Salisbury Cathedral and Justice of the Peace for Wiltshire.

== Lawrence Painting ==
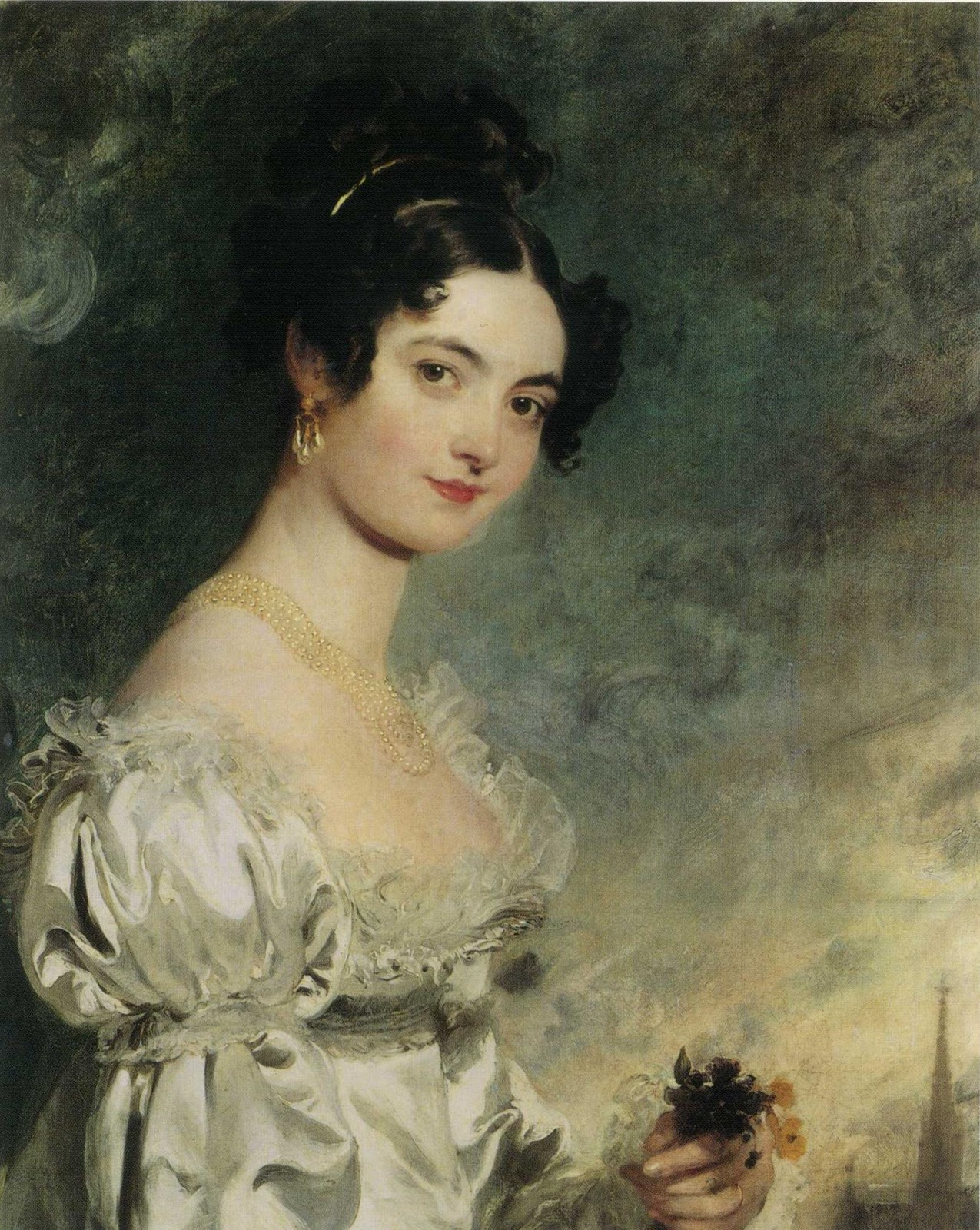
Portrait of Selina Meade by Thomas Lawrence, 1819.

His sister, Lady Selina Meade (later Countess of Clam-Martinic) was also famously painted by Sir Thomas Lawrence. In 1823, Lawrence wrote to Clanwilliam, begging his friend to ‘let me have a fine line Engraving taken of Lady Selina’s Portrait..popular wherever she has appeared..I shall have it engraved by the most skilful artist, who will be but too happy to begin it’. Clanwilliam initially didn't like the idea about his sister being ‘in the window of the printshop’. In a letter to Lawrence in 1824 by Lord Leveson-Gower, Selina’s previous suitor, mentioned Clanwilliam’s reluctance to part with the picture for this purpose, and remarks of him needed to be ‘tranquilized’ over the prospect of his sister appearing on the print market. The print was published in 1828, entitled ‘Selina’ and showing the sitter without the spire of the Stefansdom in the distance, when it appeared as the frontispiece of the first edition of the journal, The Keepsake.

Political offices
Preceded by Joseph Planta	Under-Secretary of State for Foreign Affairs; 1822–1823	Succeeded by Lord Francis Conyngham
Diplomatic posts
Preceded by ?	British Minister to Prussia; 1823–1827	Succeeded by Sir Brook Taylor
Peerage of Ireland
Preceded by Richard Meade	Earl of Clanwilliam; 1805–1879	Succeeded by Richard Meade
