= Anton Corfiz Ulfeldt =

Austrian politician and diplomat

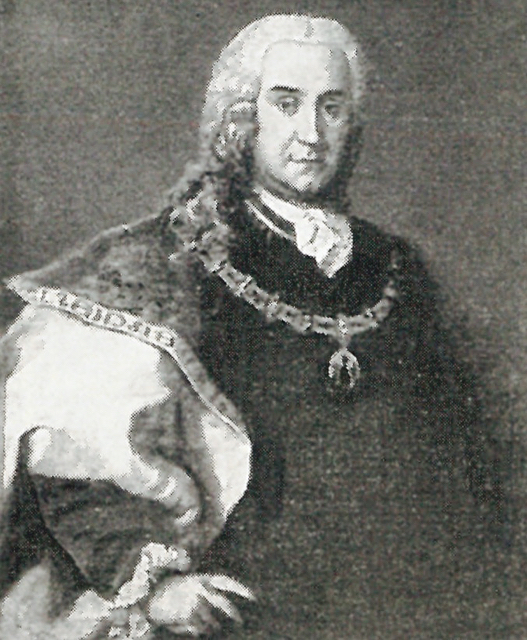
- Corfitz Anton Ulfeldt with the Order of the Golden Fleece

State Chancellor of the Habsburg monarchy
- In office 14 February 1742 – 13 May 1753
- Monarch: Maria Theresa
- Preceded by: Philipp Ludwig von Sinzendorf
- Succeeded by: Wenzel Anton

Personal details
- Born: 15 June 1699 Vienna, Austria, Holy Roman Empire
- Died: 31 December 1769 (aged 70)

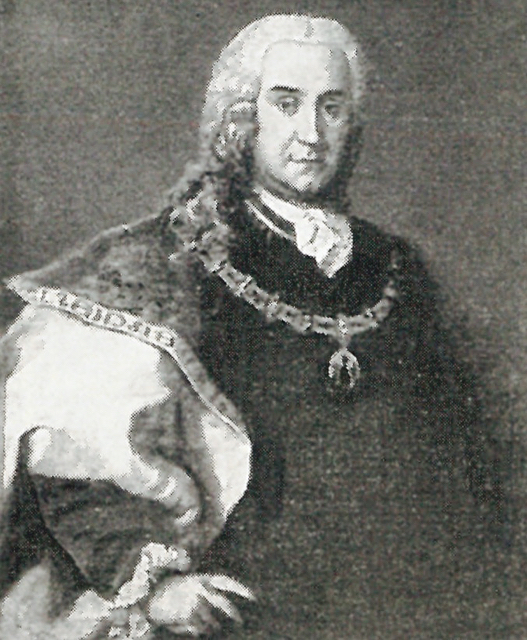
Corfitz Anton Ulfeldt with the Order of the Golden Fleece

Count Anton Corfiz von Ulfeldt (Brașov, 15 June 1699 – Vienna, 31 December 1769) was an Austrian politician and diplomat of Danish descent.

== Biography ==
He was the son of Count Leo Ulfeldt, who came from a Danish noble family and his wife, Anna Maria Sinzendorf, whose family came from Austrian nobility. After his grandfather, Corfitz Ulfeldt, was sentenced to death for high treason in Denmark, his father Count Leo Ulfeldt had fled to Austria, where he joined the Imperial Army and became a Field Marshal.

Anton Corfiz Ulfeldt also initially embarked on a military career, but was transferred to the Reichshofrat in 1724. From 1738 he was ambassador to The Hague and Constantinople. In 1742, at the instigation of Johann Christoph von Bartenstein, he became State Chancellor and responsible for Austria's foreign policy. He held this post until 1753, when Wenzel Anton Kaunitz became his successor. As foreign minister, Ulfeldt had almost no influence, Bartenstein was the one who directed Austria's course.

From 1753 until his death, Ulfelt served as Obersthofmeister to Emperess Maria Theresa.
On 5 January 1744 he was accepted into the Order of the Golden Fleece.

== Marriage and offspring ==
In his first marriage, Ulfeldt was married to Maria Anna von Virmont, heir of Count Damian Hugo von Virmont zu Neersen, but she died after a short marriage on 19 December 1731 without children.

In his second marriage, on 16 April 1743, he married Maria Elisabeth von Lobkowitz (1726–1786), daughter of Prince Philipp von Lobkowitz (died 1737).
The couple had a son, Johann Baptist, who died early, and two daughters:

- Maria Elisabeth Johanna Michaela Januaria (19 September 1747 – 27 January 1791), married in 1765 Count Georg Christian von Waldstein-Wartenberg (1743–1791). Ancestors of several European monarchs through Princess Maria Antonia Koháry.
- Maria Wilhelmine Anna Josepha (13 May 1744 – 8 May 1800), married Count Josef von Thun und Hohenstein (1734–1800), known for her patronage of Mozart and Beethoven.

== Sources ==
- ADB
- BLKÖ
- Family tree
