= John Meade, 7th Earl of Clanwilliam =

Anglo-Irish nobleman

John Herbert Meade, 7th Earl of Clanwilliam (27 September 1919 – 24 December 2009), was an Anglo-Irish nobleman.

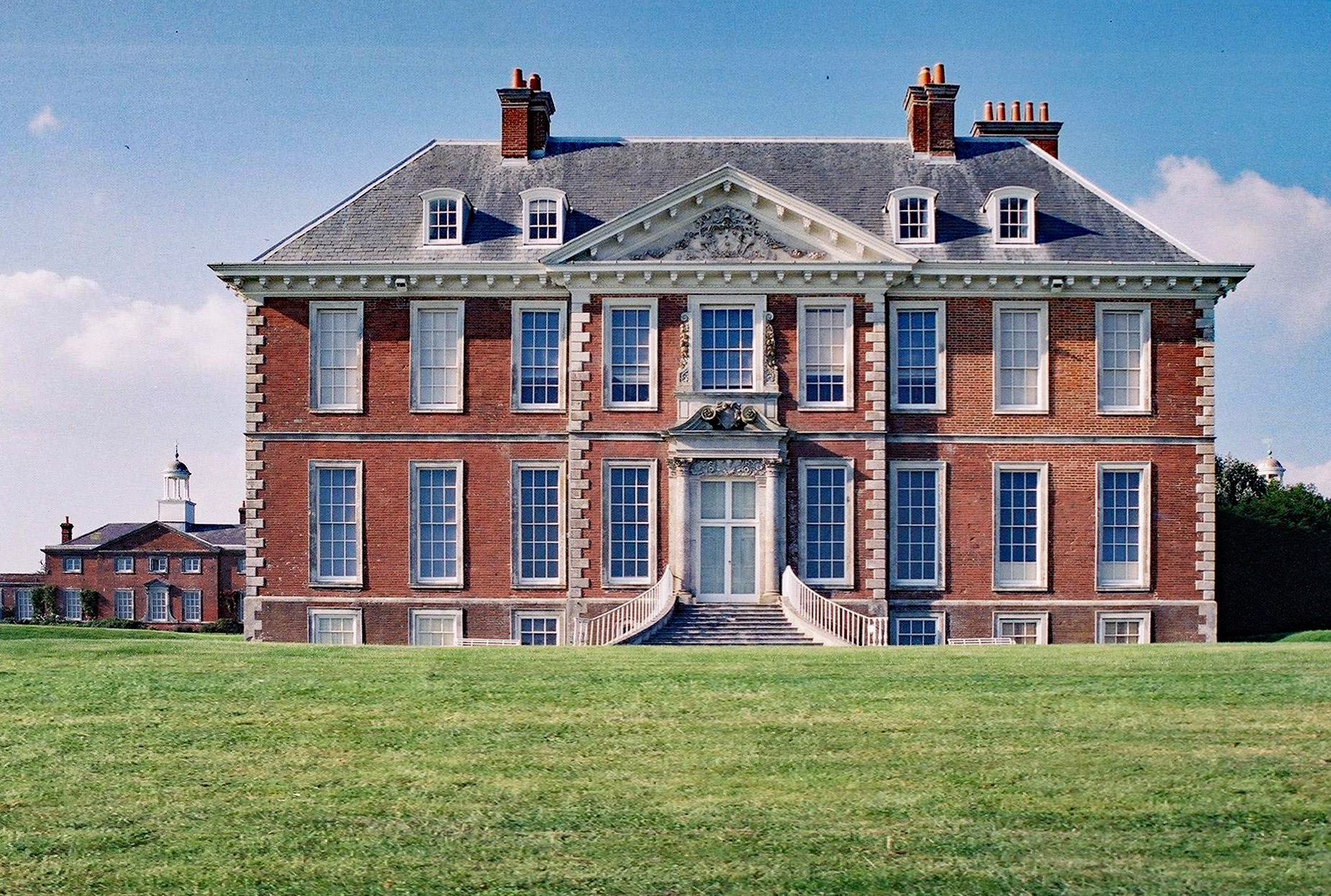
Uppark, Sussex

Meade was the second son of Admiral Sir Herbert Meade and his wife Margaret Glyn. His father inherited Uppark, Sussex in 1930 and adapted the additional surname of Fetherstonhaugh, and it was this estate that John considered home.

Following in the naval tradition of his father and grandfather, he was educated at the Royal Naval College, Dartmouth, and sailed as a midshipman in 1934. In 1940, he was promoted from acting sub-lieutenant to sub-lieutenant in the Royal Navy, but his naval career ended abruptly when he was placed on the retired list on 8 March 1942. He spent the rest of World War II working in a munitions factory in Birmingham.

On 24 August 1946, he was gazetted a second lieutenant in the King's Royal Rifle Corps. However, his time in the Army was unhappy, and after World War II, he moved to South Africa and ran an abalone canning company. He reportedly sighted some of the treasure of the Grosvenor while diving for abalone. Meade returned to England for the Coronation of Queen Elizabeth II, where he served as an usher.

He resigned his Army commission on 14 November 1953, retiring with the honorary rank of captain.

In 1956, Meade married Maxine (died 2004), daughter of James Adrian Hayden-Scott and former wife of Michael Levien, by whom he had three children:

- Lady Rowena Katherine Meade (born 1957), married Patrick James Crichton-Stuart in 1991
- Patrick Meade, 8th Earl of Clanwilliam (born 1960)
- Lady Tania Frances Meade (born 1963), married James Alwyn Compton in 1989

He lived in Tisbury, Wiltshire. On 30 March 1989, he succeeded his first cousin as Earl of Clanwilliam, and took his seat in the British House of Lords (as Baron Clanwilliam). He spoke on a variety of subjects, including soil conservation, a topic in which he took great interest, as a gardener. Lord Clanwilliam was a political conservative. In 2000, he helped organise the Tisbus minibus service for Tisbury. After the death of the Countess, he helped complete a recipe book on which she had collaborated with Graham Rust.

The Earl died on Christmas Eve, 2009, and was succeeded by his son Patrick, theretofore styled Lord Gillford.

Peerage of Ireland
Preceded by John Meade	Earl of Clanwilliam; 1989–2009	Succeeded by Patrick Meade
