= Robert Henry Meade =

British civil servant

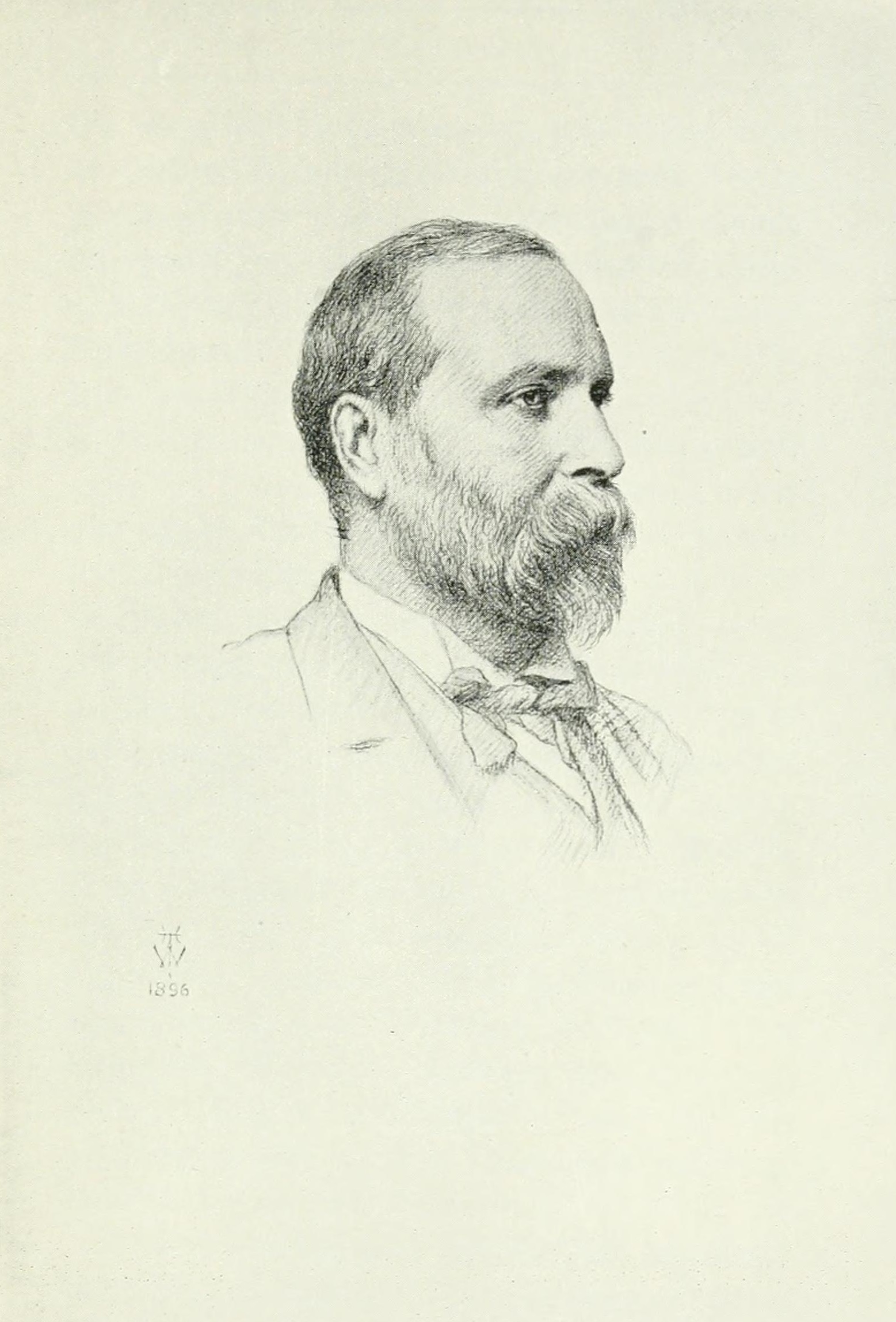
Sir Robert Henry Meade.

Sir Robert Henry Meade GCB (16 December 1835 – 8 January 1898) was a British civil servant and the Head of the Colonial Office between 1892 and 1897.

== Life ==
Meade was the second son of the 3rd Earl of Clanwilliam and Lady Elizabeth Herbert. Clanwilliam, an Irish peer, had served as Private Secretary to Lord Castlereagh and subsequently as Parliamentary Under-Secretary of State for Foreign Affairs.

Meade was educated at Harrow School and matriculated at Exeter College, Oxford in 1854, graduating B.A. in 1859 and M.A. in 1860. He formed a close and affectionate relationship with his mother’s brother, Sidney Herbert. In 1859, he sat the examination for the Foreign Office, which he entered as a third class clerk. The work of a junior clerk in the Foreign Office at the time was tedious, consisting mostly of the copying of confidential documents, but the hours were short (11.00 am to 5.00 pm) and the holidays long. Meade escaped this routine in 1860, when he was chosen to accompany Lord Dufferin on his mission to Syria as Commissioner, and again in 1861-1862, when he accompanied the Prince of Wales on an Eastern tour.

Following his return, Meade was in attendance on the Queen during her visit to Coburg later in 1862. In June 1864, he was appointed as Private Secretary to Granville Leveson-Gower, 2nd Earl Granville.

In 1868, Meade followed Lord Granville to the Colonial Office, then briefly to the Foreign Office when Granville became Foreign Secretary in 1870; but Meade returned to the Colonial Office in 1871 as Assistant Under-Secretary, becoming Permanent Under-Secretary in 1892. In December 1896, he fell and broke his leg, an injury from which he never recovered: it forced his retirement in March 1897 and he died soon after, in January 1898.

== Reputation ==
Lord Ripon, the Liberal Colonial Secretary between 1892 and 1895, wrote to him in 1895:

Experience of forty years of public service in many departments under varying circumstances enables me to say with perhaps some claim to authority that I have never known a public servant so loyal, so trusty, so indefatigable in work, so prudent in counsel as you have proved yourself to be.

Edward Walter Hamilton wrote in his diary on the occasion of Meade's death: "He had great personal charm and throughout his extraordinary fateful life his pluck never failed him."

== Family ==
Meade married, first, Lady Mary Elizabeth Lascelles (the daughter of the 3rd Earl of Harewood), who died in 1866. Their daughter, Mary, died in 1897. He married, secondly, Caroline Georgiana Grenfell (the daughter of Charles William Grenfell MP), who died in 1881. They had one son, Charles Francis Meade (1881–1975).

== Sources ==
- http://www.proni.gov.uk/records/private/clanwm.htm
- "Death Of Sir Robert Meade", The Times, London, 10 January 1898, page 9

Government offices
Preceded by Robert Herbert	Permanent Under-Secretary of State for the Colonies; 1892–1897	Succeeded by Edward Wingfield
