= Maude (surname) =

Maude is a surname, and may refer to:

- Ado Maude (born 1967), Nigerian middle-distance runner
- Alice Maude-Roxby (born 1963), English multidisciplinary artist
- Alicia Maude (born 2002), English rugby union player
- Angus Maude (born 1953), British politician
- Arthur Maude (1880–1950), English actor, screenwriter and film director
- Aylmer and Louise Maude, duo of British Tolstoyans
- Beatrice Maude (1892–1984), American actress and theatrical director
- Caitlín Maude (1941–1982), Irish poet and traditional singer
- Charles Maude (1848–1927), Anglican priest
- Clementina Maude, Viscountess Hawarden (1822–1865), Scottish photographer
- Cornwallis Maude, 1st Earl de Montalt (1817–1905), British politician
- Cornwallis Maude, 1st Viscount Hawarden (1729–1803), Anglo-Irish politician
- Cornwallis Maude, 3rd Viscount Hawarden (1780–1856), British politician
- Cyril Maude (1862–1951), English actor-manager
- David Howard Maude-Roxby-Montalto di Fragnito (born 1934), British artist
- Doris Boulton-Maude (1892–1961), British engraver
- Dorothea Maude (1879–1959), British physician and surgeon
- Edmund Maude (1839–1876), English cricketer
- Eustace Maude, 7th Viscount Hawarden (1877–1958), British Army officer and colonial official
- Francis Maude, British politician, son of Angus Maude
- Francis Cornwallis Maude (1828–1900), British soldier, recipient of the Victoria Cross
- Frederick Maude (cricketer) (1857–1923), English cricketer
- Frederick Francis Maude (1821–1897), Irish soldier, recipient of the Victoria Cross
- George Ashley Maude (1817–1894), British Army officer and courtier
- Henry Evans Maude (1906–2006), British colonial administrator, historian and anthropologist
- Honor Maude (1905–2001), British-Australian authority on Oceanic string figures, wife of Henry Evans Maude
- James Ashley Maude (1786–1841), Royal Navy officer
- Joan Maude (1908–1998), English actress
- John Maude (1901–1986), British barrister and politician
- John Maude (civil servant) (1883–1963), British civil servant
- John Maude (cricketer) (1850–1934), English solicitor and cricketer
- Jonathan Gyet Maude (born 1938), paramount ruler of Ham Chiefdom, Nigeria
- Margery Maude (1889–1979), English actress
- Mary Maude, British film and television actress
- Mary Fawler Maude (1819–1913), English religious writer and hymnist
- Nesta Gervaise Maude, later Nesta Maude Ashworth (1893–1982), British scouting notable
- Sir Robert Maude, 1st Baronet (1677–1750), Anglo-Irish politician
- Roddy Maude-Roxby (born 1930), English actor
- Sibylla Emily Maude, known as Nurse Maude (1862–1935), founder of district nursing in New Zealand
- Sophie Dora Spicer Maude (1854–1937), British writer
- Stanley Maude (1864–1917), British Army officer
- Thomas Maude (clergyman) (1801–1865), English cleric, writer and poet
- Thomas Maude (estate manager) (1718–1798), English physician, estate steward, and poet and essayist
- Thomas Maude, 1st Baron de Montalt (c.1727–1777), Anglo-Irish politician
- Timothy Maude (1947–2001), United States Army lieutenant general
- Walter Maude (1862–1943), British colonial administrator in India
