= Maude (name) =

Maude is a surname, and also a feminine given name, and may refer to:

== People ==
=== Surname ===
- Maude (surname)

=== Given name ===
- Empress Matilda (1101–1167), also called Empress Maud or Maude, first female ruler of England, mother of Henry II
- Maude Adams (1872–1953), American actress
- Maude Allen (1879–1956), American character actress
- Maude Andrews Ohl (1862–1943), American journalist, poet, novelist
- Maude Annesley (1871–1930), English novelist
- Maude Apatow (born 1997), American actress
- Maude Ballou (1925–2019), American civil rights activist
- Maude Barlow (born 1947), Canadian author and activist
- Maude Brown Dawson (1874–1946), wife of former governor of West Virginia William M. O. Dawson and served as that state's first lady, 1909–1913
- Maude Cary (1878–1967), Christian American missionary to North Africa, specifically Morocco
- Maude Dickinson (1868 or 1869–1933) claimed to have discovered organic radium crystals, known as "A High Priestess of Hygiene".
- Maude Davey (born 1963 or 1964), Australian stage, television, and film actress
- Maude Duncan, an American newspaperwoman and a former mayor of Winslow, Arkansas
- Maude Eburne (1875–1960), Canadian character actress of stage and screen, known for playing eccentric roles
- Maude Fay (1878–1964), American operatic soprano who was known for singing dramatic roles
- Maude Fealy (1883–1971), American stage and film actress
- Maude Frazier (1881–1963), American politician from Nevada
- Maude Fulton (1881–1950), Broadway stage actress who later became a Hollywood screenwriter
- Maude Garrett (born 1986), Australian broadcaster
- Maude George (1888–1963), American actress of the silent era
- Maude Harcheb, French singer and reality television contestant in Les Anges de la téléréalité, known by her mononym Maude
- Maude Kaufman Eggemeyer (1877–1959), early 20th-century painter associated with the Richmond Group of artists in Richmond, Indiana
- Maude Kegg (1904–1996), Ojibwa writer, folk artist and cultural interpreter
- Maude Kerns (1876–1965), American artist
- Maude Lloyd (1908–2004), South African ballerina and dance critic
- Maude Maggart, American singer
- Maude Meagher (1895–1977), novelist, author of Fantastic Traveller
- Maude Nugent (1877–1958), American songwriter
- Maude Odell (1870–1937), American actress
- Maude B. Perkins (1874–1932), American educator and temperance reformer
- Maude Gillette Phillips (1860–?), American author and educator
- Maude Robinson (1859–1950), Quaker writer of short stories
- Maude Royden (1876–1956), British preacher and suffragist
- Maude Storey (1930–2003), British nurse, nursing administrator and writer, as well as president of the Royal College of Nursing from 1988 to 1990
- Maude Turner Gordon (1868–1940), American actress
- Maude C. Waitt, American politician, former member of the Ohio Senate
- Maude Valérie White (1855–1937), French-born English composer

== Fictional Characters ==
- Maude Findlay, a character on the 1970s sitcom Maude
- Maude Flanders, a character from The Simpsons

== See also ==
- Viscount Hawarden, family name Maude
- Maud (given name)
