= Thomas Maude =

Thomas Maude may refer to:

- Thomas Maude (estate manager) (1718–1798), English physician, estate steward, and minor poet and essayist
- Thomas Maude, 1st Baron de Montalt (c. 1727 – 1777), Anglo-Irish politician
- Thomas Maude (clergyman) (1801–1865), English clergyman, writer and poet
