= Henry Sandford =

Henry Sandford may refer to:

- Henry Sandford (bishop) (died 1235), bishop of Rochester
- Henry Sandford (1671–1733), Irish MP for the borough of Roscommon
- Henry Sandford (1719–1796), Irish MP for County Roscommon and the boroughs of Kildare and Carrick
- Henry Sandford, 1st Baron Mount Sandford (1751–1814), Irish MP for the borough of Roscommon
- Henry Sandford, 2nd Baron Mount Sandford (1805–1828), of the Barons Mount Sandford
