= Winslow, Arkansas =

- City
- Location of Winslow in Washington County, Arkansas.
- Coordinates: 35°48′03″N 94°07′50″W
- Country: United States
- State: Arkansas
- County: Washington
- Incorporated: February 27, 1905
- Named after: Edward Francis Winslow

Area
  - Total: 1.83 sq mi (4.73 km^{2})
  - Land: 1.82 sq mi (4.72 km^{2})
  - Water: 0.0039 sq mi (0.01 km^{2})
- Elevation: 1,867 ft (569 m)

Population (2020)
  - Total: 365
  - Estimate (2025): 362 ▼
  - Density: 200.3/sq mi (77.33/km^{2})
- Time zone: UTC-6 (Central (CST))
  - Summer (DST): UTC-5 (CDT)
- ZIP code: 72959
- Area code: 479
- FIPS code: 05-76190
- GNIS feature ID: 2405770
- Website: http://www.winslowar.com

Winslow (formerly Summit Home) is a city in southern Washington County, Arkansas, United States. The population was 365 as of the 2020 census. It is part of the Northwest Arkansas region.

== History ==
A stagecoach stop for many years, the community now known as Winslow first received a post office on December 11, 1876, known as Summit Home. The town grew significantly upon completion of the Winslow Tunnel, which allowed the St. Louis – San Francisco Railway (Frisco) to run through the steep Boston Mountains of south Washington County. The town was renamed to Winslow on August 3, 1881, in honor of Edward F. Winslow, president of the Frisco Railroad. The town became a somewhat resort town for its picturesque peaks at the end of the 19th century, drawing many wealthy from the Fort Smith area to summer there. It was incorporated on February 17, 1905.

== Geography ==
According to the United States Census Bureau, the city has a total area of 1.9 square miles (4.9 km^{2}), all land. Winslow is 12 miles (19 km) east of Devil's Den State Park, along AR 74.

== Demographics ==
Historical population
Census	Pop.	Note	%±
1910	289		—
1920	264		−8.7%
1930	363		37.5%
1940	248		−31.7%
1950	248		0.0%
1960	183		−26.2%
1970	227		24.0%
1980	247		8.8%
1990	342		38.5%
2000	399		16.7%
2010	391		−2.0%
2020	365		−6.6%
2025 (est.)	362	▼	−0.8%
U.S. Decennial Census

As of the census of 2010, there were 391 people, 146 households, and 105 families residing in the city. The population density was 205.8 inhabitants per square mile (79.5/km^{2}). There were 180 housing units at an average density of 94.7 per square mile (36.6/km^{2}). The racial makeup of the city was 95.9% White, 0.3% Black or African American, 0.5% Native American, 0.8% from other races, and 2.6% from two or more races. 2.0% of the population were Hispanic or Latino of any race.

There were 146 households, out of which 24.7% had children under the age of 18 living with them, 56.2% were married couples living together, 12.3% had a female householder with no husband present, 3.4% had a male householder with no wife present, and 28.1% were non-families. 24.0% of all households were made up of individuals, and 7.5% had someone living alone who was 65 years of age or older. The average household size was 2.68 and the average family size was 3.15.

The distribution of age in Winslow reflects a change in the population that has occurred between 2000 and 2010 as the percentage of individuals under the age of 18 has dropped from 28.6% to 21.5% and individuals 24–44 dropped from 23.3% to 20.2%. All other age categories have in turn risen, those 18 to 24 have risen from 8.0% to 9.7%, those age 45 to 64 rose 25.8 to 33.5%, and those who were 65 years of age or older rose from 14.3% to 22.4%. This population shift is likely a result of the closure of the Winslow Public School district, as families with children left the area and new families have not replaced them. The median age was 43.6 years. For every 100 females, there were 109.1 males.

The median income for a household in the city was $32,692, and the median income for a family was $45,000. Males had a median income of $31,389 versus $41,719 for females. The per capita income for the city was $15,415. About 11.5% of families and 23.6% of the population were below the poverty line, including 30.9% of those under age 18 and 13.7% of those age 65 or over.

== Education ==
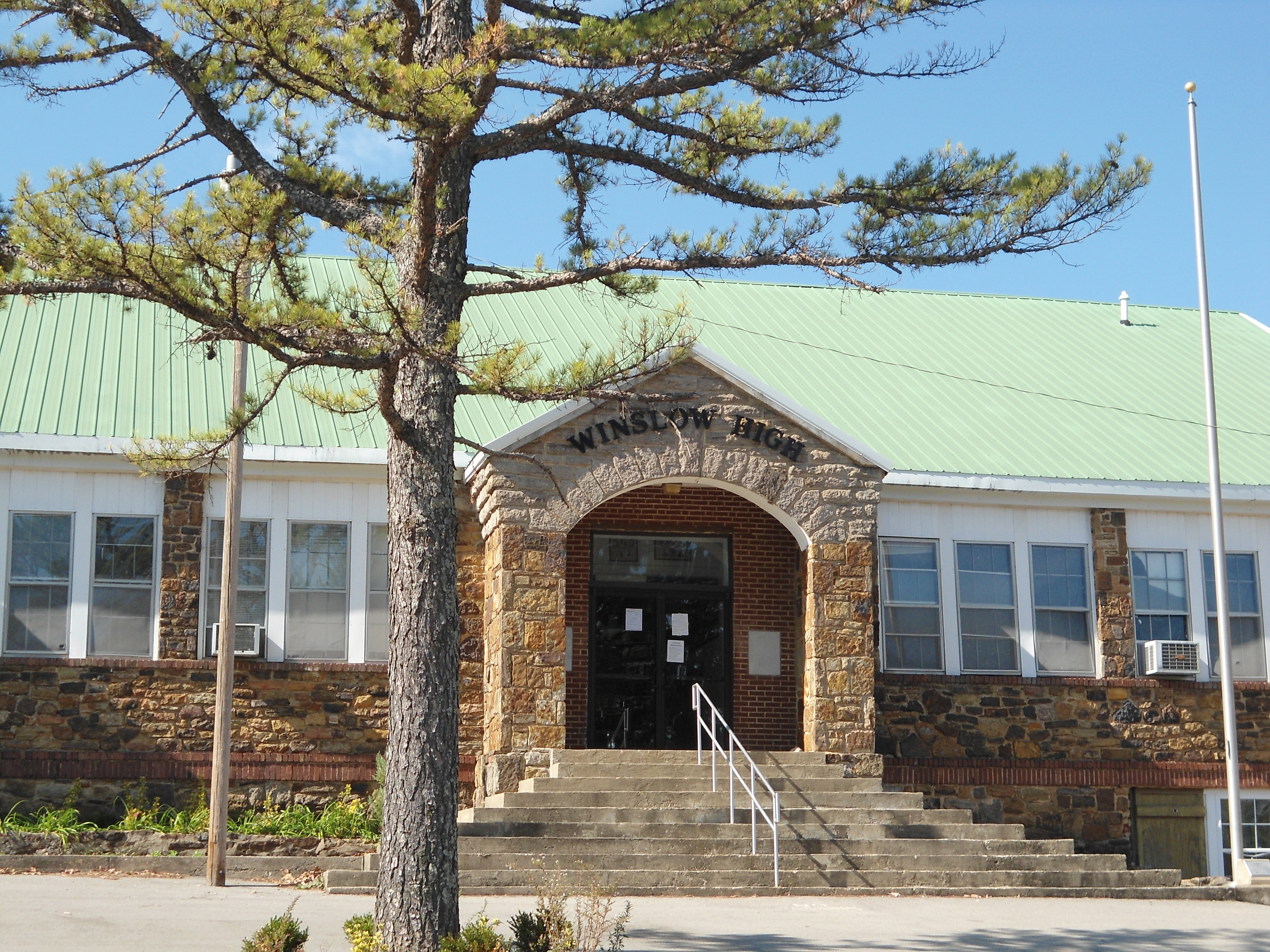
This 1930 building formerly housed Winslow High School. It now contains the Winslow Public Library.

It is within the Greenland School District, and served by Greenland High School in Greenland.

For many years, Winslow had its own school system, the Winslow School District. It served the city and nearby rural areas in the southern portion of Washington County. By most counts, enrollment for grades K–12 was usually in the mid-20s per grade.

The district became part of the Greenland school district on July 1, 2004, after the Arkansas Legislature passed a state law that mandated districts with less than 350 students consolidate (Winslow had 273 students). The high school, which actually served grades 7–12, closed at the end of the 2004–2005 school year. The graduating class at the 2005 spring ceremony had 14 seniors. Winslow Elementary for grades K–6 was retained for a time following the high school closure. However, in November 2006, the Greenland School Board voted to close that school at the end of the 2006–2007 school year after two years with an enrollment of about 90 students. The mascot of Winslow Public Schools was the Fighting Squirrels.

The majority of the student body did not go to Greenland. They instead opted to transfer to the West Fork school district. The voters of Winslow are currently petitioning the Arkansas Department of Education and Arkansas Legislature to change Winslow's former district from Greenland to West Fork.

The Winslow campus now houses the Winslow Public Library, Friends of the Library Bookstore, and Internet Cafe in the old High school building.

== Transportation ==
As of 2023, there is no fixed route transit service in Winslow. Ozark Regional Transit operates demand-response service in the city. The nearest intercity bus service is provided by Jefferson Lines in Fayetteville.

== Notable people ==
- Kevin Carson, research associate and author
- Maude Duncan, American newspaperwoman and a former mayor of Winslow
- Douglas C. Jones, Western historical writer, born in Winslow
- John Joshua Webb, Old West gunman died in Winslow in 1882

== See also ==
- Devil's Den State Park
