= Lord Maude =

Lord Maude may refer to:

- Francis Maude, Baron Maude of Horsham (born 1953), British Conservative politician, son of Angus Maude
- Angus Maude, Baron Maude of Stratford-upon-Avon (1912–1993), British Conservative politician, father of Francis Maude

== See also ==
- Viscount Hawarden, surnamed Maude
