= General Maude =

General Maude may refer to:

- Frederick Francis Maude (1821–1897), British Army general
- Stanley Maude (1864–1917), British Army lieutenant general in the Mesopotamian campaign and fall of Baghdad in 1917
- Timothy Maude (1947–2001), U.S. Army lieutenant general killed in the September 11, 2001 attacks
