= Jane M. Blocker =

American art historian

Jane M. Blocker is a Professor of Contemporary Art and Theory and the Chair of the Department of Art History at the University of Minnesota, Twin Cities, where she is affiliated with the Moving Image Studies at the Department of Cultural Studies and Comparative Literature. In a note on the back cover of Blocker's What the Body Cost Lucy R. Lippard writes of her: "Jane Blocker is as good a writer, scholar, and original thinker as feminists could hope for."

Blocker received her Master of Arts from the School of the Art Institute of Chicago (SAIC) and her Ph.D. from the University of North Carolina at Chapel Hill where she studied with Carol Mavor. Blocker's research has focused primarily on performance art as it developed concurrently with postmodern, feminist, and constructionist theories. Blocker teaches courses on contemporary art, alternative media: Video, Performance, and Digital Art, historiography of Art History, and gender and sexuality in Modern and Contemporary Art.

== Selected publications ==
- Becoming Past: History in Contemporary Art, (Minneapolis: University of Minnesota Press, 2015) ISBN 1-4529-4494-6
- Seeing Witness: Visuality and the Ethics of Testimony, (Minneapolis: University of Minnesota Press, 2009) ISBN 0-8166-5476-X
- What the Body Cost: Desire, History, and Performance, (Minneapolis: University of Minnesota Press, 2004) ISBN 0-8166-4318-0
- Where is Ana Mendieta?: identity, performativity, and exile, (Durham: Duke University Press, 1999), ISBN 0-8223-2324-9
- "This Being You Must Create: Transgenic Art and Seeing the Invisible," Cultural Studies 17, no. 2 (2003)
- "A Cemetery of Images: Meditations on the Burial of Photographs," Visual Resources XX, no. 2 (May 2004)
- "Binding to Another's Wound: Of Weddings and Witness," in After Criticism: New Responses to Contemporary Art, edited by Gavin Butt. (London: Blackwell, 2005) ISBN 0-631-23284-2
- "Failures of Self-Seeing: James Luna Remembers Dino," Performing Arts Journal XXIII, no. 1 (January 2001)
- "Woman-House: Architecture, Gender and Hybridity in What's Eating Gilbert Grape?," in Camera Obscura 39 (November 1998), ISSN 0270-5346
- "The Bed Took Up Most of the Room," in Peggy Phelan and Jill Lane, eds., The End(s) of Performance (New York: NYU Press, 1997), ISBN 0-8147-6647-1
