= George Sandford, 3rd Baron Mount Sandford =

Irish politician

George Sandford, 3rd Baron Mount Sandford (10 May 1756 – 25 September 1846), was an Irish politician.

Sandford was the third son of Henry Sandford by the Honourable Sarah Moore, daughter of The 1st Viscount Mountcashell. He was returned to the Irish House of Commons for both Carrick and Roscommon in 1783, but chose to sit for the latter. He continued to represent this constituency until 1797 and again between 1798 and 1799. In 1800 his elder brother Henry was elevated to the Peerage of Ireland as Baron Mount Sandford, with a special remainder to his younger brothers William and George. George's nephew Henry succeeded to the barony in 1814 but was killed at a brawl at Windsor on his way to the Ascot races in 1828, when the title devolved on George. As this was an Irish peerage it did not entitle him to a seat in the House of Lords and he was never elected an Irish representative peer.

Lord Mount Sandford died in September 1846, aged 90, when the barony became extinct.

Parliament of Ireland
| Preceded by Robert Sandford; Henry Sandford | Member of Parliament for Roscommon; 1783–1797; With: Sir Cornwallis Maude, Bt 1783–1785; Maurice Copinger 1785–1790; Hon. Nathaniel Clements 1790–1791; Henry Sandford 1791–1797 | Succeeded by Henry Sandford; Silver Oliver |
| Preceded by Henry Sandford; Silver Oliver | Member of Parliament for Roscommon; 1798–1799; With: Henry Sandford | Succeeded by Henry Sandford; William Johnson |
Peerage of Ireland
| Preceded by Henry Sandford | Baron Mount Sandford; 1828–1846 | Extinct |
