= Edward Ives (naval surgeon) =

British naval surgeon (1719–1786)

Edward Ives (1719–1786) was a British naval surgeon who served in Charles Watson's fleet up to 1757. He is notable for writing From England To India In The Year 1754, an account of his journey to India and overland return, published in 1773.

== Biography ==
Edward Ives was a British physician and traveller, who served in the navy as surgeon of the Namur in the Mediterranean from 1744 to 1746, and returned to England in the Yarmouth. He was afterwards for some time employed by the commissioners for sick and wounded, and from 1753 to 1757 was surgeon of the Kent, bearing the flag of Vice-admiral Charles Watson as commander-in-chief in the East Indies.

On the admiral's death in August 1757, Ives's own health being somewhat impaired, he resigned his appointment, and travelled home overland from Basra, through Baghdad, Mosul, and Aleppo, thence by Cyprus, to Livorno and Venice, and so home through Germany and Holland, arriving in England in March 1759.

He had no further service in the navy, but continued on the half-pay list till 1777, when he was superannuated. During his later years he resided at Titchfield in Hampshire, dividing his time, apparently, between literature and farming. He died at Bath, Somerset on 25 September 1786.

In 1773 he published A Voyage from England to India in the year 1754, and an Historical Narrative of the Operations of the Squadron and Army in India, under the command of Vice-admiral Watson and Colonel Clive, in the years 1755–1756–7; … also a Journey from Persia to England by an unusual Route. According to John Knox Laughton in the Dictionary of National Biography, Ives's presence at many of the transactions which he describes and his personal intimacy with Watson give his historical narrative an unusual importance, and his accounts of the manners and customs of the inhabitants, and of the products of the countries he visited, are those of an enlightened and acute observer.

Ives married, firstly, Rebecca Mary Otto Bayer in February 1745, at Rowner, Hampshire. Bayer died in childbirth in 1747 leaving a daughter, Rebecca Maria. Ives next married about 1751 Ann, daughter of Richard Roy of Titchfield, by whom he had issue a daughter, Eliza, and three sons, the eldest of whom, Edward Otto, was in Bengal at the time of his father's death; the second, Robert Thomas, had just been appointed to a writership; the third, John Richard, seems to have been still a child. Mention is also made of a sister, Gatty Ives.

Ives is noted as an acquaintance of Thomas Maude, a fellow naval surgeon.

== Works ==
- A Voyage from England to India in the year 1754 (1773)
