= Greenland High School =

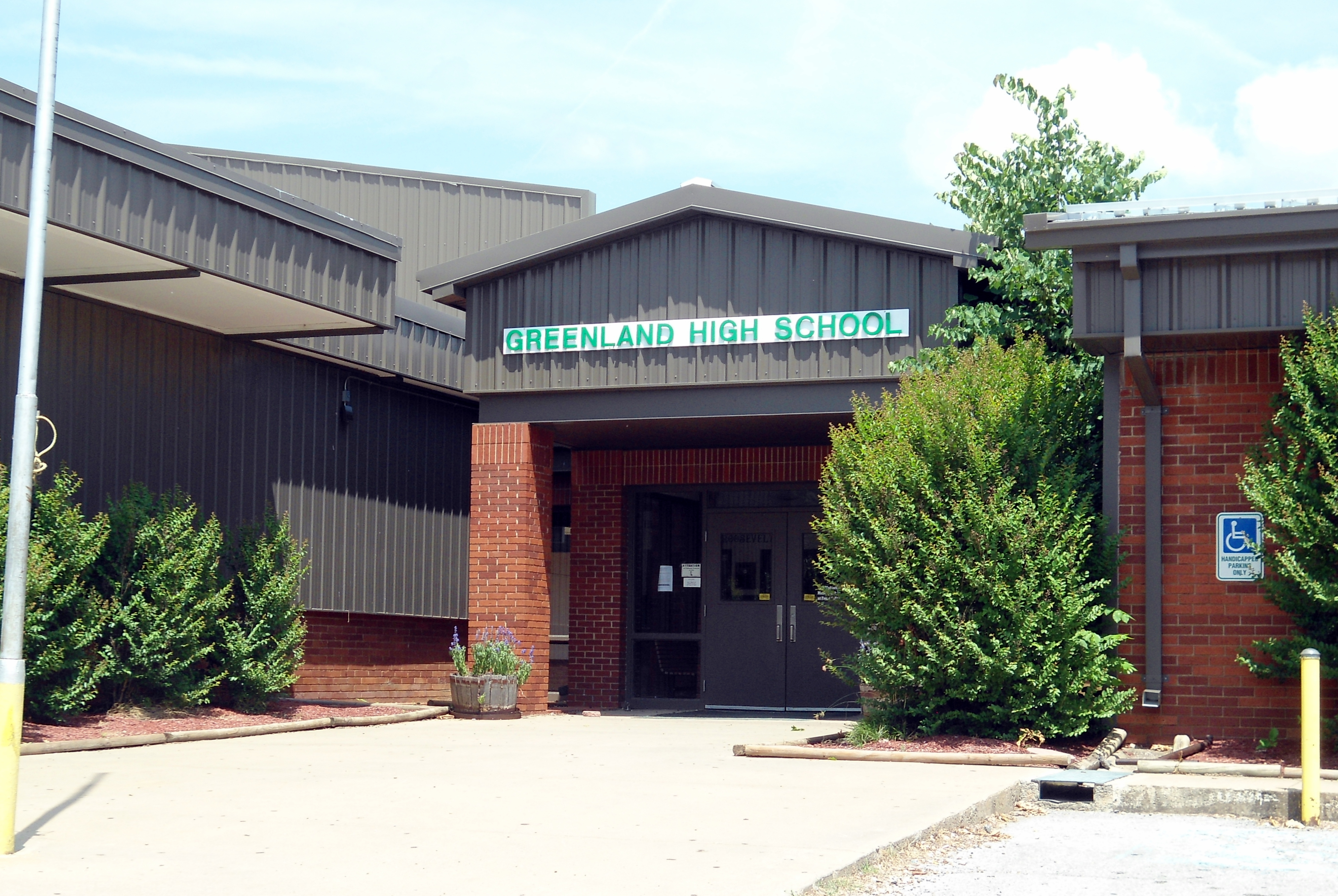

Location
- 30 North Sandy Avenue; Greenland, Arkansas 72737; United States; 35°55′17″N 94°11′28″W

Information
- Type: Public secondary
- School district: Greenland School District
- NCES District ID: 0506930
- CEEB code: 040945
- NCES School ID: 050693000420
- Faculty: 32.34 (on FTE basis)
- Grades: 9–12
- Student to teacher ratio: 7.70
- Colors: Green and white
- Athletics conference: 3A Region 1 (2014-16)
- Mascot: Pirate
- Website: www.greenlandschools.k12.ar.us/page/high-school

Greenland High School is a comprehensive four-year public secondary school in Greenland, Arkansas, United States. It is one of ten public high schools in Washington County and the sole high school administered by the Greenland School District.

In addition to Greenland, the school district boundary (and therefore that of the high school) included Winslow and portions of Fayetteville and West Fork.

== Academics ==
The assumed course of study follows the Smart Core curriculum developed by the Arkansas Department of Education, which requires students to complete at least 22 units to graduate. Students complete regular (core and career focus) courses and exams and may select Advanced Placement coursework and exams that provide an opportunity for college credit. The school is accredited by the Arkansas Department of Education and has been accredited by AdvancED since 1994.

== Extracurricular activities ==
The Greenland High School mascot and athletic emblem is the Pirate with green and white serving as its school colors.

=== Athletics ===
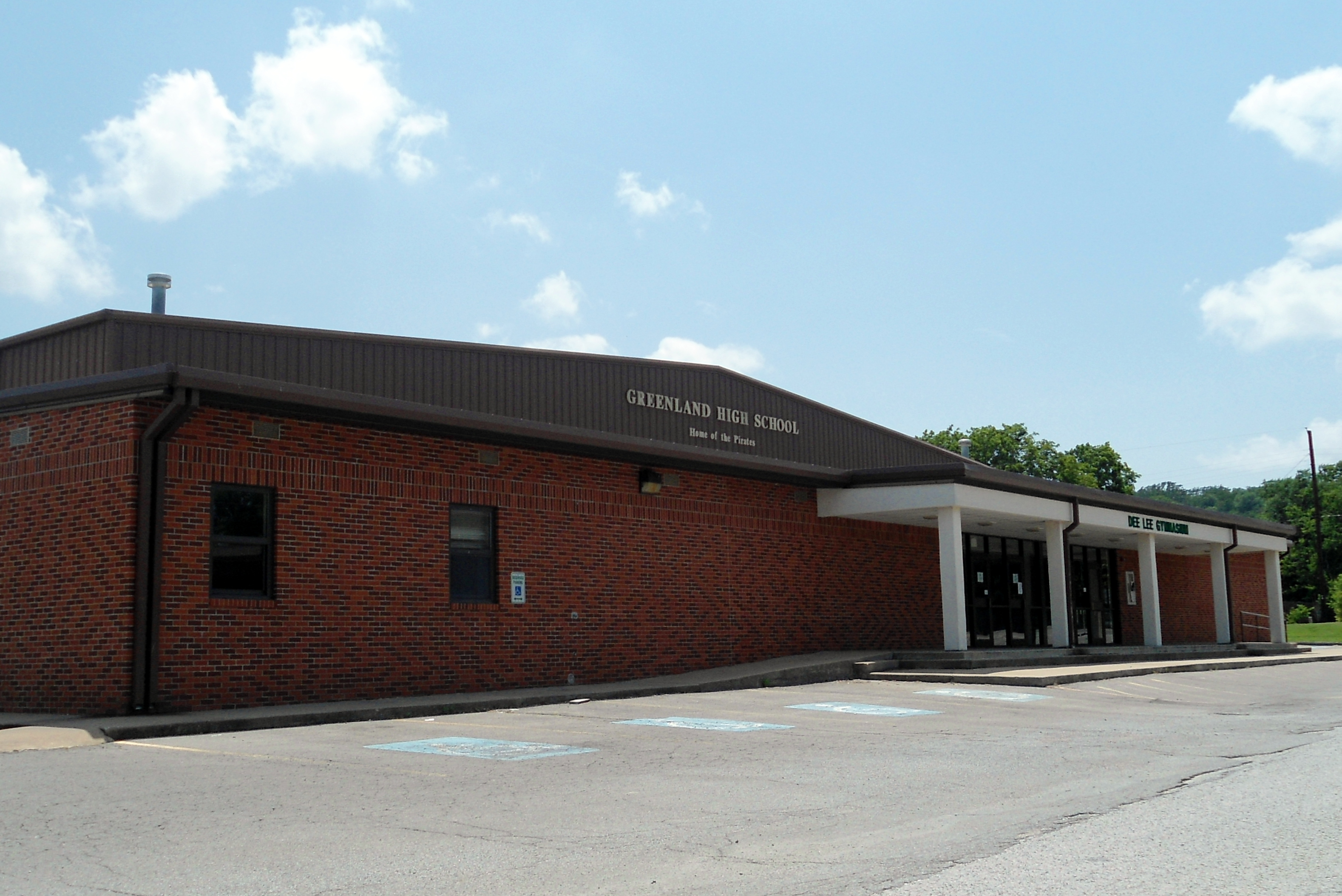
Dee Lee Gymnasium

For 2014–16, the Greenland Pirates compete in the 3A Classification within the 3A Region 1 Conference as sanctioned by the Arkansas Activities Association. Interscholastic activities include football, basketball, baseball, cheer, cross country (boys/girls), golf (boys/girls), softball, and track (boys/girls). Under the direction of Clay Reeves and Alan Barton, the girls basketball team has won six state championships (1999, 2000, 2002, 2012, 2013, 2015).
