= Cornwallis Maude, 3rd Viscount Hawarden =

British politician

Cornwallis Maude, 3rd Viscount Hawarden (28 March 1780 – 12 October 1856) was a British Conservative politician.

Hawarden was the son of Cornwallis Maude, 1st Viscount Hawarden, by his second wife Anne Isabella (née Monck), and succeeded his half-brother in the viscountcy in 1807. In 1836 he was elected an Irish representative peer and took his seat on the Conservative benches in the House of Lords. He served as a Lord-in-waiting (government whip in the House of Lords) under Sir Robert Peel from 1841 to 1846 and under the Earl of Derby in 1852.

Lord Hawarden married Jane, daughter of Patrick Crawford Bruce, in 1811. She died in 1852. Hawarden survived her by four years and died in October 1856, aged 76. He was succeeded in the viscountcy by his only son Cornwallis, who was created Earl de Montalt in 1886.

== Notes ==
Peerage of Ireland
Preceded by Thomas Ralph Maude	Viscount Hawarden; 1807–1856	Succeeded by Cornwallis Maude
Political offices
Preceded by The Lord Dufferin and Claneboye	Representative peer for Ireland; 1836–1856	Succeeded by The Viscount de Vesci
