= Winslow School District =

Defunct school district in Arkansas, United States

Winslow School District No. 20 was a school district headquartered in Winslow, Arkansas. The mascot was the squirrel.

On July 1, 2004, it merged into the Greenland School District.
