= Baron Mount Sandford =

Baron Mount Sandford, of Castlerea in the County of Roscommon, was a title in the Peerage of Ireland. It was created on 31 July 1800 for Henry Sandford, with remainder in default of male issue of his own, to his brothers William Sandford and George Sandford, and the heirs male of their bodies. He had previously represented Roscommon in the Irish House of Commons. He was succeeded according to the special remainder by his nephew, the second Baron. He was the son of William Sandford. Lord Mount Sandford was kicked to death during a brawl at Windsor on his way to the Ascot races in 1828. He was succeeded by his uncle, the third Baron. He had previously represented County Roscommon and the borough of Roscommon in the Irish Parliament. The barony became extinct on his death on 25 September 1846. The Sandford family descended from Theophilus Sandford, who was granted lands at Castlerea in County Roscommon in reward for his services during the English Civil War. His grandson Robert Sandford was a member of the Irish Parliament for County Roscommon. The latter's eldest son, Henry Sandford, also represented this constituency in the Irish Parliament. Henry Sandford eldest son was the first Baron Mount Sandford.

== Barons Mount Sandford (1800) ==
- Henry Moore Sandford, 1st Baron Mount Sandford (1751–1814)
- Henry Sandford, 2nd Baron Mount Sandford (1805–1828)
- George Sandford, 3rd Baron Mount Sandford (1756–1846)
