= Henry Sandford, 1st Baron Mount Sandford =

Irish peer and politician

The Right Honourable The Lord Mount Sandford

Member of the Irish House of Commons for Roscommon
- In office 1791–1800 Serving with George Sandford, Silver Oliver, William Johnson
- Preceded by: George Sandford; Hon. Nathaniel Clements
- Succeeded by: Parliament of the United Kingdom
- In office 1776–1783 Serving with Robert Sandford
- Preceded by: Robert Sandford; Robert Tighe
- Succeeded by: Sir Cornwallis Maude, Bt; George Sandford

Personal details
- Born: Henry Moore Sandford; 28 July 1751
- Died: 29 December 1814 (aged 63)
- Spouse: Katherine Oliver (m. 1780)
- Relations: Stephen Moore, 1st Viscount Mountcashell (grandfather); George Sandford, 3rd Baron Mount Sandford (brother)
- Parent(s): Henry Sandford; Hon. Sarah Moore

Henry Moore Sandford, 1st Baron Mount Sandford (28 July 1751 – 29 December 1814), was an Irish landowner and politician.

== Early life ==
Sandford was the son of Henry Sandford by the Honourable Sarah Moore, daughter of Stephen Moore, 1st Viscount Mountcashell.

== Career ==
He was returned to the Irish House of Commons for Roscommon in 1776, a seat he held until 1783 and again between 1791 and 1800. The latter year he was elevated to the Peerage of Ireland as Baron Mount Sandford, of Castlerea in the County of Roscommon, with remainder in default of male issue of his own, to his brothers William and George, and the heirs male of their bodies.

== Personal life ==
Lord Mount Sandford married Katherine Oliver, daughter of Silver Oliver, in 1780. They had no surviving children.

Lord Mount Sandford died in December 1814, aged 63, and was succeeded in the barony according to the special remainder by his nephew Henry Sandford, the son of William Sandford. Lady Mount Sandford died in October 1818.

Parliament of Ireland
Preceded by Robert Sandford; Robert Tighe	Member of Parliament for Roscommon; 1776–1783; With: Robert Sandford	Succeeded by Sir Cornwallis Maude, Bt; George Sandford
Preceded by George Sandford; Hon. Nathaniel Clements	Member of Parliament for Roscommon; 1791–1800; With: George Sandford 1791–1798, 1798–1799; Silver Oliver 1798; William Johnson 1799–1800	Parliament of the United Kingdom
Peerage of Ireland
New creation	Baron Mount Sandford; 1800–1814	Succeeded by Henry Sandford
