= Greenland School District =

School district in Arkansas, United States

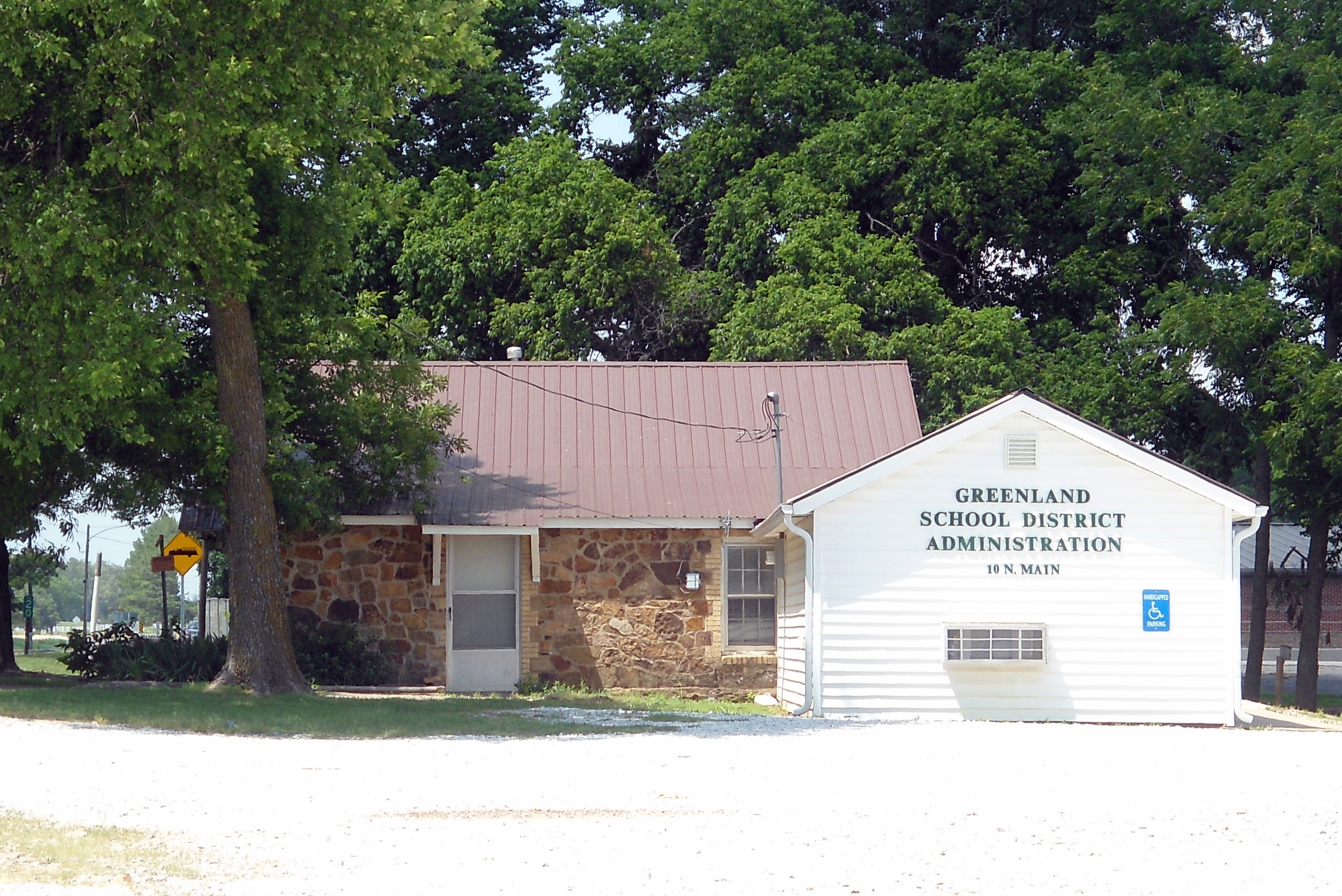

Location
- 10 North Main Street; Greenland, Arkansas 72737 Northwest Arkansas United States

District information
- Motto: "Connecting with each child"
- Grades: K–12
- Accreditation: Arkansas Department of Education
- Schools: 3
- NCES District ID: 0506930

Students and staff
- Students: 792
- Teachers: 75.52 (on FTE basis)
- Staff: 143.52 (on FTE basis)
- Student–teacher ratio: 10.49
- Athletic conference: 2A 8 (Football); 2A 7 West (Basketball)
- District mascot: Pirates
- Colors: Green; White

Other information
- Website: greenlandschools.k12.ar.us {Main district only}

Greenland School District is a public school district headquartered in Greenland, Arkansas, United States. The school district provides early childhood, elementary and secondary education from kindergarten through grade 12. Greenland School District encompasses 135.58 square miles (351.2 km^{2}) of land of Washington County. Communities in its attendance boundary include Greenland, Winslow, portions of West Fork, and portions of Fayetteville.

== History ==
On July 1, 2004, the Winslow School District merged into the Greenland School District. In the mid-2000s about 178 students from the Winslow area enrolled in schools outside of the Greenland school district after the Greenland district closed the Winslow schools. The loans needed to acquire the Winslow district buildings and the loss of funding from Winslow students put a strain on the Greenland district's finances.

Circa 2008 the Arkansas Board of Education considered forcing Greenland school district to merge with another district due to low performance, but instead the ABE took control of the district for a one-year period.

== List of schools ==
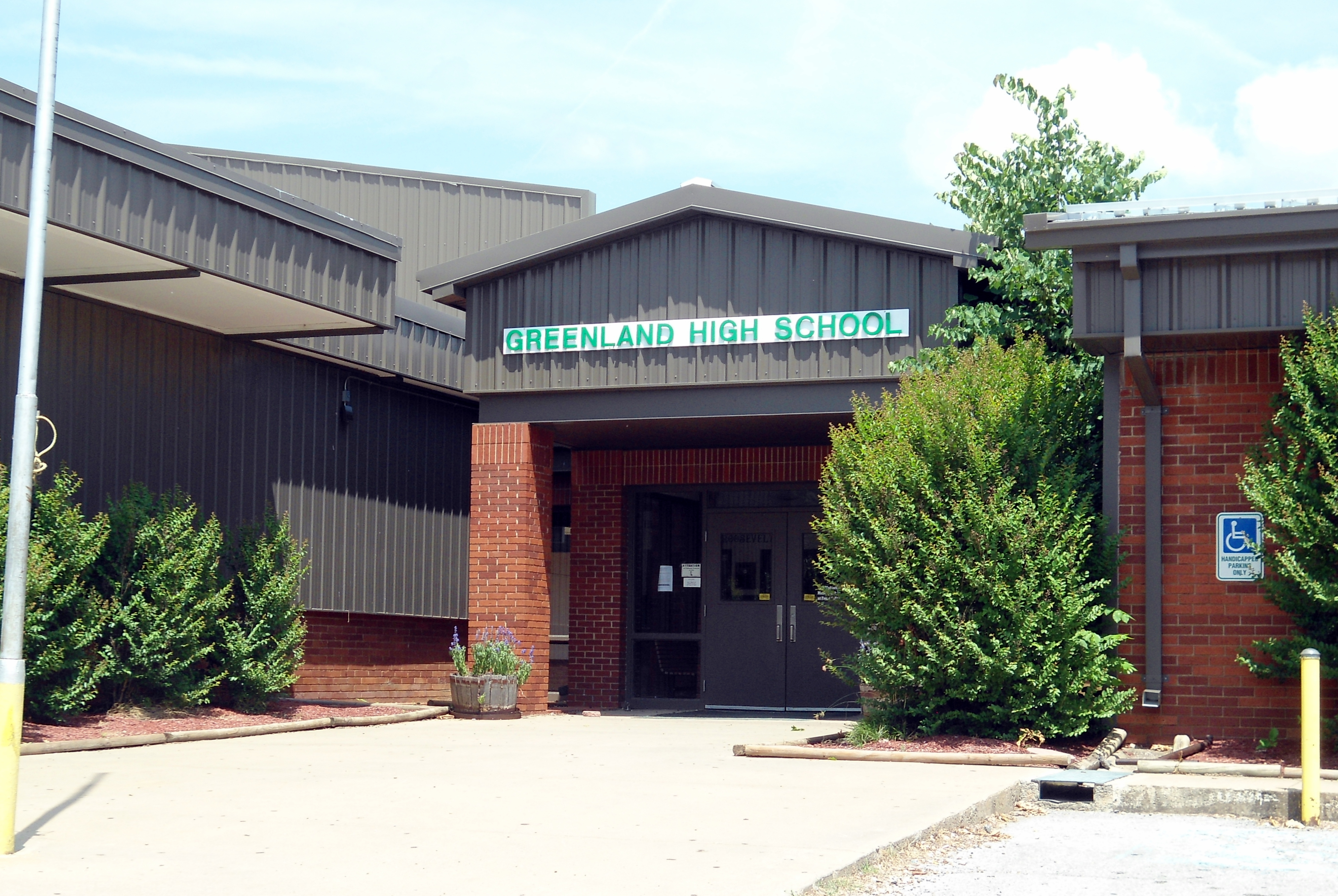
Greenland High School

The school district supports more than 757 students at its three schools:

- Greenland High School, serving more than 255 students in grades 9 through 12.
- Greenland Middle School, serving more than 260 students in grades 5 through 8.
- Greenland Elementary School, serving more than 250 students in kindergarten through grade 4.

The district initially operated elementary and high schools in Winslow but they were later closed.
