= James Laing (doctor) =

Scottish doctor (c. 1749–1831)

James Laing (c.1749–1831) was a Scottish medical doctor and slave plantation owner in Dominica.

== Life ==
He was born in the parish of Crimond, c. 1748, the son of Alexander Laing and Jane Henderson. According to later testimony, he was resident as a young man in Dominica, by the later 1760s. There were other Scots of the same name in the Caribbean at this period, including Dr James Laing in Tobago, from Elgin, Moray.

Laing acquired lands in Scotland, at Haddo-Rattray, Buchan, in 1789. According to the Topographical Dictionary of Scotland (London, 1846), writing about Crimond, "There is an ancient seat called Haddo, and an elegant modern mansion has been built on the estate of Rattray." In that year Laing had given evidence on plantation life in Dominica to the Privy Council, later commented on by John Ranby, James Stephen and Eric Williams.

In 1793 Laing was provost marshal in Dominica. When a gift of £700 of plate was made to Henry Hamilton as Governor, for his efforts in repelling a French invasion of Dominica, Laing with Thomas Daniell was chosen for the formal presentation on 14 June 1796. In 1798 Laing was acting as Collector for the island.

In 1804 a parliamentary report recorded Laing as the owner of 51 enslaved people. During the 1805 French attack on Roseau, the island's capital, Laing was an eye-witness, and later gave testimony on it. In 1806, as Collector and member of the Dominica Council, he gave evidence to a committee of the House of Commons.

At the beginning of 1814, George Robert Ainslie was Governor of Dominica, and involved in a campaign against the island's Maroons. Laing was still holder of the position of provost marshal, but was in the United Kingdom on sick leave. Ainslie considered him old, and asked to have him replaced, by his own brother. He was rebuffed in March 1814 by Lord Bathurst, the Secretary of State for War and the Colonies, who considered Laing fit for his duties. During trials of Maroons of that summer, Thomas Laing was acting provost marshal. In 1815 Sir Robert Heron, 2nd Baronet, whose wife was a relation of the dismissed Ainslie, spoke in defence of his conduct on Dominica, and incidentally mentioned Laing's 48 years of residence on the island.

In England, Laing was High Sheriff of Surrey in 1815, as James Laing of Streatham. He lived at Moor Park, Farnham; William Cobbett commented in the 1820s on the change of ownership as recent.

Laing died on 24 April 1831, at age 82.

== Macoucherie estate ==
A land grant was made in 1804 in the parish of St Joseph, Dominica to James Laing, John Lucas and Robert Reid. By 1804, Laing was an owner of the Macoucherie sugar estate (there are different spellings), with Robert Reid. A legal agreement of 1811 shows that there was a previous owner of this estate in St Joseph parish, John Mair. At that time there were three owners, with one of them, Thomas Lucas, disposing of his one-third share to Laing and Robert Reid. Laing is described as of Streatham. In his will, Laing left his one-half share to his younger son.

In 1822–3 Laing with George Henry Rose supported a Wesleyan Methodist mission to the slaves of the estates in Dominica; and he is mentioned in Rose's 1823 book on the conversion to Christianity of slaves. The missionary James Catts mentioned in 1823 that his colleague Thomas Harrison was visiting Laing's estates. The anonymous work Sketches and Recollections of the West Indies of 1828, by "a Resident", was dedicated to Laing. As well as being a personal account, it discussed slavery and its abolition, in terms of measures of amelioration and the need for compensation. The authorship was attributed by John Malcolm Bulloch to Hugh Gordon, a soldier involved in the defence of Roseau.

Some years after Laing's death, compensation was paid on the Macouchorie estate (tentative identification of claim), when slavery was abolished in the British Empire. Some of it went to the trustees for Laing, an amount that may have been equal going to Abraham Wildey Robarts. Elizabeth Stewart Hay, Laing's niece, was a counter-claimant. The daughter of David Stewart Hay of Perth, Scotland, she married the Rev. Thomas Maude, the poet.

The estate was sold by the government in 1938, and it was bought in 1943 by Howell Donald Shillingford, with a cane mill and rum distillery. In 1953 it was owned by H. Shillingford. It is still active and producing rum, the last such estate on Dominica.

== Other estates and associations ==
Details of the compensation claim for the Springfield estate on Dominica show two-thirds going to Allan Stewart Laing, and one-third to Robarts & Kendall. James Laing came to own or part own also the Union and York Valley estates on Dominica.

Laing was the uncle of William Bremner of the Aberdeen Estate coffee plantation, who married Jane Mary Laing. Bremner was a Scottish physician and sailed for Dominica in 1794, leaving in 1815 and leaving a memoir in manuscript. He bought the Dawn plantation in 1805, with Dr Johnstone, another physician with whom he was in practice; that partnership was dissolved in 1807. He then went into business with Thomas Laing & Co.

On 29 August 1808 John Laing died, at age 28, as acting provost marshal, a position he held when George Metcalfe was acting Governor (period 1805–8). James Laing was involved in land deals with Metcalfe. John Laing was the eldest son of Thomas Laing (Thomas Laing Esq. of Haddo).

Thomas Henderson (died 1816), an assembly member, was another nephew of Laing.

== Will and legacy ==
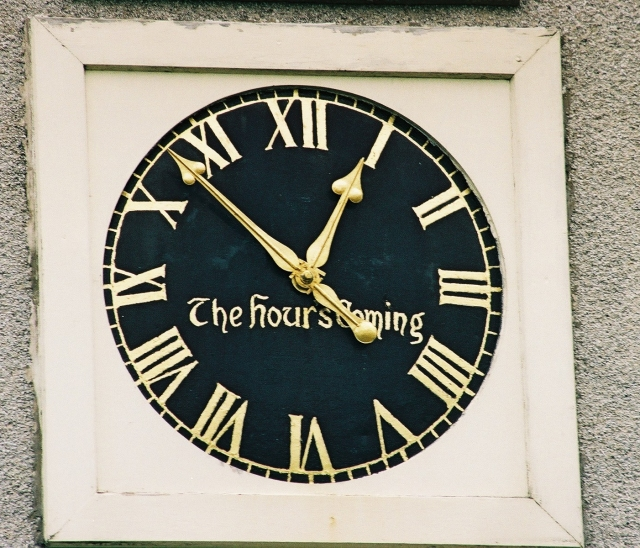
Clock with 61 minutes presented by James Laing to Crimond Church

Under Laing's will, his estate at Haddo went to William John Laing, and the Union Estate on Dominica to Allan Stewart Laing. Laing's trustees were the solicitor Abel Jenkins, and Allan Stewart Laing.

== Family ==
Laing's wife Eliza (or Elizabeth) died in 1816, at age 61 (or 63). Their children included:

- James Bruce Laing, the eldest son, of the Bengal Civil Service, died 15 October 1823 at Purnia at age 45.
- William John Laing, the elder surviving son in 1831.
- Allan Stewart Laing, a police court magistrate in London, until removed by the Home Secretary for bad temper, in 1837.
