= Francis Cornwallis Maude =

Recipient of the Victoria Cross

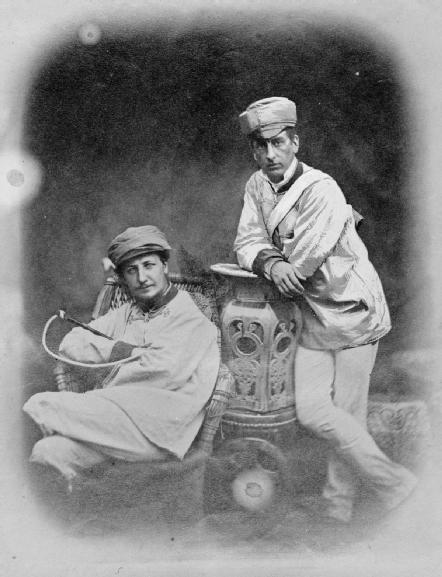
- Francis Maude VC (right)
- Born: 28 October 1828; London, England
- Died: 19 October 1900 (aged 71); Windsor, Berkshire
- Burial place: Windsor Borough Cemetery
- Relatives: F. F. Maude VC (cousin)
- Military career
- Allegiance: United Kingdom
- Branch: British Army
- Rank: Colonel
- Unit: Royal Artillery
- Conflicts: Indian Mutiny
- Awards: Victoria Cross; Order of the Bath
- Other work: Consul-General at Warsaw

Colonel Francis Cornwallis Maude VC CB (28 October 1828 – 19 October 1900) was an English recipient of the Victoria Cross (VC), the highest and most prestigious award for gallantry in the face of the enemy that can be awarded to British and Commonwealth forces.

== Early life ==
Maude was born in London, the son of a Royal Naval captain and grandson of Cornwallis Maude, 1st Viscount Hawarden. After attending Blackheath Proprietary School and the Royal Military Academy, Woolwich, he was commissioned in October 1847 as a second lieutenant in the Royal Artillery. After home service, in 1855 he went to Ceylon to command a battery. On the outbreak of the Indian Mutiny in June 1857, Maude's battery shipped to Calcutta and joined Henry Havelock's force, occupying Cawnpore in July. The force then advanced on Lucknow where, on 25 September 1857, they successfully fought through to reinforce the besieged British forces.

== VC action ==
Maude was a 28 years old captain in the Royal Artillery, British Army during the Indian Mutiny when the following deed took place on 25 September 1857 at Lucknow, India for which he was awarded the VC:

This officer steadily and cheerily pushed on with his men, and bore down the desperate opposition of the enemy, though with the loss of one-third of his Artillerymen. Sir James Outram adds, that this attack appeared to him to indicate no reckless or foolhardy daring, but the calm heroism of a true soldier, who fully appreciates the difficulties and dangers of the task he has undertaken and that, but for Captain Maude's nerve and coolness on this trying occasion, the Army could not have advanced. (Extract from Field Force Orders of the late Major-General Havelock, dated 17th October, 1857.)

== Later life ==
Maude spent much of the remainder of the Indian Mutiny at Lucknow, including the British withdrawal in November 1857 and the city's recapture in March 1858. In this period he was promoted in the army to major (January 1858) and lieutenant colonel (July 1858), and was appointed a Companion of the Order of the Bath (CB) in March 1858. Returning to England in 1860, Maude was appointed to a garrison artillery battery at Plymouth, before service in the Mediterranean. Promoted to colonel in July 1866, he retired a month later.

After leaving the army, Maude was involved in various business enterprises in Britain and overseas, but in December 1867 he was reported bankrupt. From 1870 he farmed in Canada, then England, before moving abroad in 1875, first to France, then to Warsaw, where he served as British Consul-General from 1876 to 1886. In February 1888 he went to Madagascar where he was involved in timber-felling and farming. He promoted Madagascar as a destination for British emigration and enterprise, later writing a book of his experiences entitled Five years in Madagascar, with notes on the military situation, published in 1895. Maude returned to England in 1893, and published his Memories of the Mutiny in 1894.

In 1895 Maude was appointed a Military Knight of Windsor by Queen Victoria, a body reserved for retired officers who received a pension and accommodation at Windsor Castle. Maude died at Windsor on 19 October 1900, and was buried in Windsor Borough Cemetery.

== Legacy ==
On 24 January 1860 Maude married Paulina Susannah Sterling, they had one son and three daughters. He was the cousin of Lieutenant Colonel F. F. Maude VC.

76 (Maude's) Battery Royal Artillery, the current name for Maude's unit, was awarded his name as their title in honour of both his and the units deeds at Lucknow. The battery celebrates Maude's Day every 25 September, in his honour.

Maude's medals are not publicly held.

== Works ==
- Memories of the mutiny. London: Remington. 1894. OCLC 1001899552.
- Five years in Madagascar, with notes on the military situation. London: Chapman and Hall. 1895. OCLC 457475434.
- Bacon or Shakspere? : enquiries as to the authorship of the plays of Shakespeare. London: Robert Banks & Sons. 1895. OCLC 934892502.
