= Frederick Francis Maude =

Recipient of the Victoria Cross

General Sir Frederick Francis Maude VC GCB
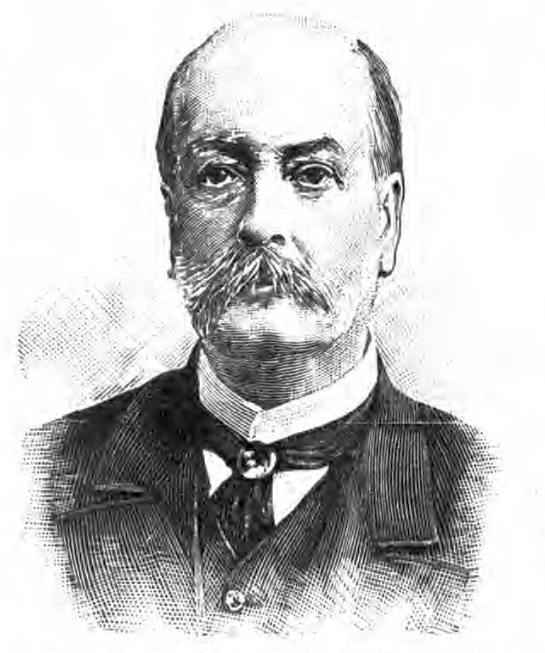
- Born: 20 December 1821; Lisnadill, County Armagh, Ireland
- Died: 20 June 1897 (aged 75); Torquay, Devon
- Burial place: Brompton Cemetery, London
- Relatives: Francis Cornwallis Maude (cousin)
- Military career
- Allegiance: United Kingdom
- Branch: British Army
- Service years: Retired 5 November 1885
- Rank: General
- Unit: 3rd Regiment of Foot
- Conflicts: Crimean War; Second Anglo-Afghan War
- Awards: Victoria Cross; Knight Grand Cross of the Order of the Bath

General Sir Frederick Francis Maude VC GCB (20 December 1821 – 20 June 1897) was a British Army officer and a recipient of the Victoria Cross, the highest and most prestigious award for gallantry in the face of the enemy that can be awarded to British and Commonwealth forces.

== Personal life ==
He was born in Lisnadill, County Armagh, the son of the Reverend the Honourable John Charles Maude, son of Cornwallis Maude, 1st Viscount Hawarden. He married Catherine Mary Bisshopp, daughter of the Very Reverend Sir George Bisshopp, 9th Baronet, on 22 February 1853. The couple had five children

- Ada Cecil Maude d. 16 Jul 1886
- Alice Emily Maude b. 7 Jun 1855, d. 8 Feb 1936
- Frederick Eustace Cecil Maude b. 2 May 1859, d. 17 Feb 1862
- Amy Kathleen Maude b. 3 Mar 1863, d. 30 Jul 1937
- Lt.-Gen. Sir Stanley Maude KCB CMG DSO b. 24 Jun 1864, d. 18 Nov 1917

He was also the cousin of Colonel F. C. Maude, VC

== Victoria Cross ==
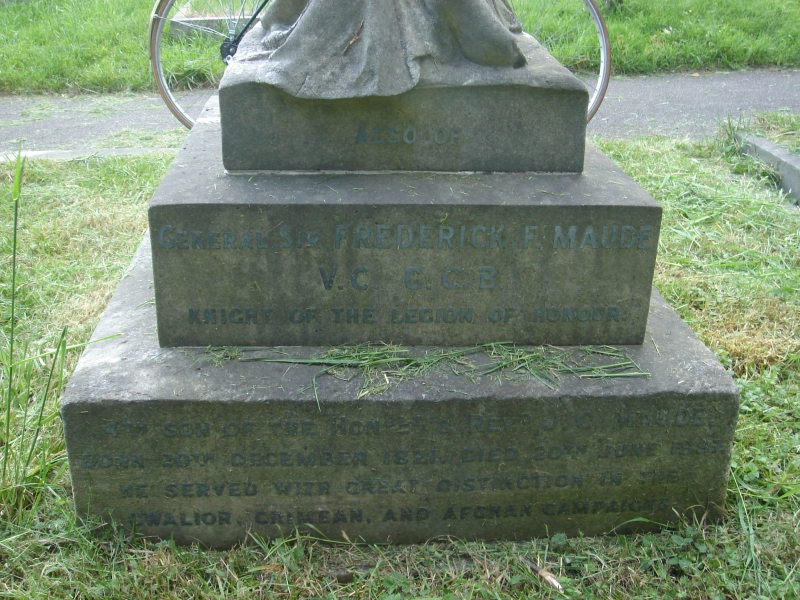
Funerary monument, Brompton Cemetery, London

He was 33 years old, and a brevet lieutenant colonel in the 3rd Regiment of Foot (later The Buffs (East Kent Regiment)), British Army during the Crimean War when the following deed took place for which he was awarded the VC.

On 5 September 1855 at Sebastopol, Crimea, Lieutenant Colonel Maude was in charge of the covering and ladder party of the 2nd Division in the assault on the Redan. He held a position with only nine or ten men and did not retire until all hope of support was at an end and he himself was dangerously wounded.

== Later life ==
Maude served in the Peshawar Field Force and became General Sir Frederick Francis Maude VC GCB.

He died in Torquay, Devon on 20 June 1897 and is buried in Brompton Cemetery, London.
