= Cornwallis Maude, 1st Earl de Montalt =

British politician

The Right Honourable The Earl de Montalt
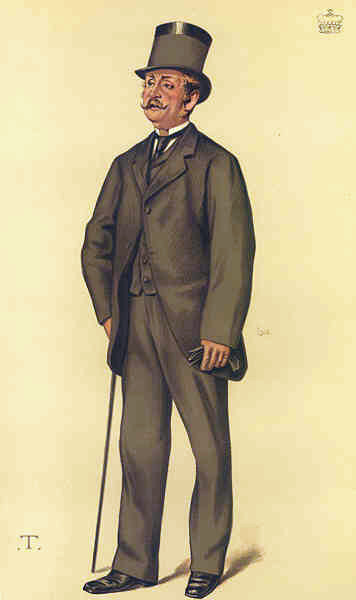
- Maude as caricatured in Vanity Fair, November 1881
- Born: Cornwallis Maude; 4 April 1817; London, England
- Died: 9 January 1905 (aged 87); Isle of Anglesey, Wales
- Occupation: Politician
- Title: Earl de Montalt; Viscount Hawarden
- Spouse: Clementina Elphinstone Fleeming (m. 1845; died 1865)
- Children: 8
- Parent(s): Cornwallis Maude, 3rd Viscount Hawarden; Jane Crauford Bruce

Cornwallis Maude, 1st Earl de Montalt (4 April 1817 – 9 January 1905), styled The Honourable Cornwallis Maude until 1856 and known as The Viscount Hawarden from 1856 to 1886, was a British Conservative politician.

== Background ==
Maude was the only son of Cornwallis Maude, 3rd Viscount Hawarden, and his wife Jane (née Bruce).

== Political career ==
Maude succeeded his father in the viscountcy in 1856 but as this was an Irish peerage it did not entitle him to an automatic seat in the House of Lords. However, in 1862 he was elected an Irish representative peer, and later served in the Conservative administrations of the Earl of Derby, Benjamin Disraeli and Lord Salisbury as a Lord-in-waiting (government whip in the House of Lords) from 1866 to 1868, 1874 to 1880 and 1885 to 1886. In the latter year, he was created Earl de Montalt, of Dundrum in the County of Tipperary, in the Peerage of the United Kingdom. Between 1885 and 1905 he also held the honorary post of Lord-Lieutenant of County Tipperary.

== Family ==
Lord de Montalt married Clementina, eldest daughter of Admiral Charles Elphinstone Fleeming, in 1845, and had ten children, of whom eight survived infancy. She was a noted amateur photographer. She died in 1865. One of their sons, the Honourable Cornwallis Maude, a captain in the Grenadier Guards, was killed in action at the Battle of Majuba Hill in 1881. Of their daughters, probably the best known is Kathleen, who was divorced for adultery by her first husband, Gerald Brooke, in 1886, a case which aroused enormous media interest. Lord de Montalt died on 9 January 1905, aged 87, at a hotel at Holyhead, Anglesey. While waiting for a boat to Ireland he became too ill to travel and died. As he had no surviving sons the earldom became extinct on his death. He was succeeded in his other titles by his cousin Robert Henry Maude.

Honorary titles
Preceded by The Viscount Lismore	Lord Lieutenant of Tipperary; 1885–1905	Succeeded by The Lord Dunalley
Peerage of the United Kingdom
New creation	Earl de Montalt; 1886–1905	Extinct
Peerage of Ireland
Preceded by Cornwallis Maude	Viscount Hawarden; 1856–1905	Succeeded by Robert Maude
Parliament of the United Kingdom
Preceded by The Viscount Dungannon	Representative peer for Ireland; 1862–1905	Succeeded by The Earl of Darnley
