= Maude Duncan =

American businesswoman and politician

Maud Duncan
- Born: October 22, 1873; Fayetteville, Arkansas
- Died: January 21, 1958 (aged 84); Fayetteville, Arkansas

Virginia Maud Duncan (née Dunlap; October 22, 1873 – January 21, 1958) was an American newspaperwoman and politician. She worked as a pharmacist and owned and operated the Winslow American between 1908 and 1956. She was the former mayor of Winslow, Arkansas from 1925 to 1927, serving with an all-woman city council as a "petticoat government".

== Early life ==
Duncan was born on October 22, 1873, in Fayetteville, Arkansas. Her parents were Dudley Clinton and Catherine Hewitt Dunlap but after her mother died while she was a baby, she and her brother Rufus moved in with her aunt and uncle, Virginia and Albert, in Fort Smith. The family moved to Winslow on July 12, 1887. Her uncle homeschooled her until she was able to enter high school, when she received a teaching certificate from Cane Hill College at the age of 16. She worked briefly as a teacher and an organist at St. Stephen's Episcopal Church. Duncan married Hallam Pearce, who worked for the St. Louis–San Francisco Railway, on February 26, 1894. The couple had two daughters, both of whom died young, and the marriage was annulled on October 3, 1901. Her uncle donated the building for the Helen Dunlap School for Mountain Girls, which was named after her daughter.

== Career ==
Duncan began working as a pharmacist in 1906, becoming the second woman in the state to receive her registration certificate as a pharmacist. She worked at the M. D. Pearce drug store in Winslow with her uncle. She was engaged to T.E. Gray in 1905 but broke off the engagement. She married Gilbert Nelson Duncan on June 3, 1908, and the couple purchased a monthly newsletter which they renamed the Winslow American. They began publishing weekly issues, starting on September 4, 1908, and Duncan wrote editorials focusing on women's suffrage. The newspaper sold war bonds to support the country's participation in World War I. Following her husband's death from the 1918 flu epidemic, she continued to run her drug store and the newspaper.

Duncan ran for mayor of Winslow in 1925, being elected along with an all-woman city council which became known as the "Petticoat Government". The government built a road along a steep mountain, encouraged businesses to lower prices on building supplies so residents could improve their homes, and closed the jail in town, requiring criminals to pay a fine or be dealt with by the county. Duncan and the council were re-elected for a second one-year term in 1926 and chose not to run the following year.

== Later life and legacy ==
In 1935, her pharmacy building – and the newspaper offices above it – burned down. Duncan worked to keep the newspaper going and published it sporadically until 1956, when she moved to a retirement home. She died on January 21, 1958, in Fayetteville. She was buried at St. Stephen's Episcopal Cemetery in Winslow. The newspaper building on Highway 71 was briefly a museum containing her printing and pharmaceutical equipment but it was closed and her foot-treadle printing press was moved to the Har-ber Village Museum in Grove, Oklahoma. Her papers are held by the University of Arkansas.
