= Sir Robert Maude, 1st Baronet =

Anglo-Irish politician

Sir Robert Maude, 1st Baronet (1677 – 4 August 1750) was an Anglo-Irish politician.

== Biography ==
He was the only son of Anthony Maude, MP for Cashel and High Sheriff of Tipperary, and Alice Hartstonge, daughter of Sir Standish Hartstonge, 1st Baronet, Baron of the Court of Exchequer (Ireland) and his first wife Elizabeth Jermyn of Gunton Hall, Norfolk. He married Elizabeth Cornwallis, daughter of Thomas Cornwallis of Abermarlais, Carmarthenshire, and his wife Emma Charlton, and sister of Francis Cornwallis MP; her stepfather was John Robinson, Bishop of London. He lived at Dundrum House, near Cashel, County Tipperary. On the death without issue of her brother, Emma inherited a quarter of his substantial estate in South Wales.

Maude sat in the Irish House of Commons as the Member of Parliament for Gowran from 1703 to 1713. Between 1713 and 1727 he represented St Canice, before sitting for Bangor from 1727 to his death in 1750. On 9 May 1705 he had been created a baronet, of Dundrum in the Baronetage of Ireland, and was succeeded in his title by his eldest son, Thomas Maude, who was created Baron de Montalt in 1776 but died unmarried. His second son, Cornwallis Maude, was created Viscount Hawarden in 1793. They also had a daughter Emma, who was the second wife of Sir Charles Leighton, 3rd Baronet.

Parliament of Ireland
Preceded by Edward May; Joseph Stepney	Member of Parliament for Gowran; 1703–1713; With: Patrick Wemyss	Succeeded by Sir Richard Levinge, Bt; James Agar
Preceded by Richard Connell; Richard Cole	Member of Parliament for St Canice; 1713–1727; With: Sir Standish Hartstonge, Bt	Succeeded by James Agar; Richard Dawson
Preceded by Michael Ward; Acheson Moore	Member of Parliament for Bangor; 1727–1750; With: Acheson Moore	Succeeded by Mathew Forde; Acheson Moore
Baronetage of Ireland
New creation	Baronet (of Dundrum); 1705–1850	Succeeded by Thomas Maude
