= Carol Mavor =

American writer and professor

- Title: Professor of Art History and Visual Culture

Academic background
- Education: University of California, Santa Cruz
- Thesis: Utopic imagings of difference within Victorian culture: The little girl, the sleeper, the Virgin Mother and "the-maid-of-all-work" (1989)

Academic work
- Discipline: Art history
- Institutions: University of Manchester
- Main interests: Visual culture; photography; color
- Notable works: Pleasures Taken: Performances of Sexuality and Loss in Victorian Photographs; Becoming: The Photographs of Clementina, Viscountess Hawarden; Blue Mythologies: Reflections on a Colour
- Website: www.carolmavor.com

Carol Jane Mavor is an American writer and professor. Her work includes the books Pleasures Taken: Performances of Sexuality and Loss in Victorian Photographs, Becoming: The Photographs of Clementina, Viscountess Hawarden, and Blue Mythologies: Reflections on a Colour. She is Professor of Art History and Visual Culture at the University of Manchester.

== Writing ==
Mavor's first book, Pleasures Taken: Performances of Sexuality and Loss in Victorian Photographs, was published by Duke University Press in 1995. Pleasures Taken critically analyzes three Victorian era photograph collections, including photographs of young girls collected by Lewis Carroll, and argues that similarities in fantasies between Victorians and people of the present day make it difficult for current observers to see Victorian desires. While The Times Literary Supplement described her application of literary theory as "strained", it also noted that Mavor "intends to provoke, and she succeeds".

Four years later Mavor's second book, Becoming: The Photographs of Clementina, Viscountess Hawarden, was published by Duke University Press. Becoming examines the photographs taken by Clementina Maude, Viscountess Hawarden of her daughters, and reads them for sensual and erotic content. Susan Freeman, writing for the Journal of Women's History, summarized the book as "a theoretical and provocative examination of female photographers and their subjects, mother-daughter relationships, pleasure, and same-sex sexuality". The Village Voice praised Mavor's "real flair for evoking and elucidating individual images" but criticized her "tendency to fall into erotic flights of fancy", ultimately concluding that "Mavor's analytic foibles far outweigh her strengths". The Times Literary Supplement also found fault with Mavor's "single-minded" interpretations, and noted that the book "shows no interest in how Hawarden herself might have viewed her photography".

Mavor's 2007 book Reading Boyishly: J.M. Barrie, Roland Barthes, Jacques Henri Lartigue, Marcel Proust and D.W. Winnicott, a "boyish" exploration of the work of the authors named in the title, was described by Grayson Perry in The Guardian as a "thrilling mix of philosophy, photography, biography and much more", and by Susan Salter Reynolds in the Los Angeles Times as "a defense of adolescence".

In 2012 Duke University Press published Mavor's book Black and Blue: The Bruising Passion of Camera Lucida, La Jetée, Sans Soleil and Hiroshima mon amour, in which Mavor uses personal recollections to interpret the French post-war works of Roland Barthes, Chris Marker, Marguerite Duras and Alain Resnais. The Los Angeles Review of Books described the book as “a testimony to the bruising and wounding power of art” written in "an unabashedly first person, nonprescriptive account". In French Studies, Max Silverman pointed out that "Carol Mavor does not write conventional works of art and literary criticism" and that although the writing is "defiantly non-rational", its "poetic ‘logic’ of similarities and differences and correspondences and absences open up culture and the unconscious in illuminating ways."

Blue Mythologies: Reflections on a Colour, which Publishers Weekly called a "fine, multi-disciplinary work" that "explores the color's aesthetic and emotional resonances from a fresh perspective", was published by Reaktion Books in 2013. Visual Studies summarized Blue Mythologies as "a poetic and scholarly exploration of humanity's fascination with blue, written in an unashamedly personal and structurally inventive style". Writing for the Los Angeles Review of Books, Dylan Montanari praised Mavor's ability "to coax us into having a less complacent attitude to our own contradictory investments, even when it comes to something as apparently innocuous as a color", but also noted that some readers might dismiss some of the book's analysis as "fanciful musings on Mavor's part, fit for a memoir, perhaps, but little else". Philip Hoare of Times Higher Education suggested that "it is easier to read Blue Mythologies as enhanced poetry, rather than prose", concluding that the book "succeeds in directing our eyes anew".

Mavor's book, Aurelia: Art and Literature Through the Mouth of the Fairy Tale was published by Reaktion Books in 2017. For Jack Zipes the book itself is “an extraordinary, poetical, and analytical fairy tale” about art, literature and fairytales, which Mavor uses to demonstrate “how we comprehend and metonymically live our lives through these stories”.

Mavor's poem "Mothball Moon" was published in P. N. Review. She has also written essays for Cabinet Magazine.

== Films ==
Mavor created the film Fairy Tale Still Almost Blue, which was described in The Philadelphia Inquirer as "something akin to an all-female, fairy-tale version of Thomas Mann's dark novella Death in Venice". She also wrote and performed in Full, which was filmed and edited by Megan Powell.

== Academic career ==
Mavor is a professor of Art History and Visual Culture at the University of Manchester, and has held temporary honorary positions at other institutions including the Northrop Frye Chair in Literary Theory at the University of Toronto in 2010 and the Novo Nordic Professor Art History and Visual Culture at the University of Copenhagen in 2019. She taught formerly at the University of North Carolina at Chapel Hill. She earned her PhD in the History of Consciousness in 1989 under the direction of Hayden White at the University of California, Santa Cruz.

== Podcasts ==
In 2018, the podcast This is Love spoke with Mavor for their episode, "Blue."

== Bibliography ==
- Mavor, Carol (1995). Pleasures Taken: Performances of Sexuality and Loss in Victorian Photographs. Duke University Press. ISBN 978-0-8223-1619-0.
- Mavor, Carol (1999). Becoming: The Photographs of Clementina, Viscountess Hawarden. Duke University Press. ISBN 978-0-8223-2355-6.
- Mavor, Carol (2007). Reading Boyishly: J. M. Barrie, Roland Barthes, Jacques Henri Lartigue, Marcel Proust and D. W. Winnicott. Duke University Press. ISBN 978-0-8223-3886-4.
- Mavor, Carol (2012). Black and Blue: The Burning Passion of Camera Lucida, La Jetée, Sans Soleil and Hiroshima mon amour. Duke University Press. ISBN 978-0-8223-5252-5.
- Mavor, Carol (2013). Blue Mythologies: Reflections on a Colour. Reaktion Books. ISBN 978-1-78023-083-2.
- Mavor, Carol (2017). Aurelia: Art and Literature Through the Mouth of the Fairy Tale. Reaktion Books. ISBN 978-1-78023-717-6.
