= Clementina Maude, Viscountess Hawarden =

British photographer (1822–1865)

The Right Honourable The Viscountess Hawarden
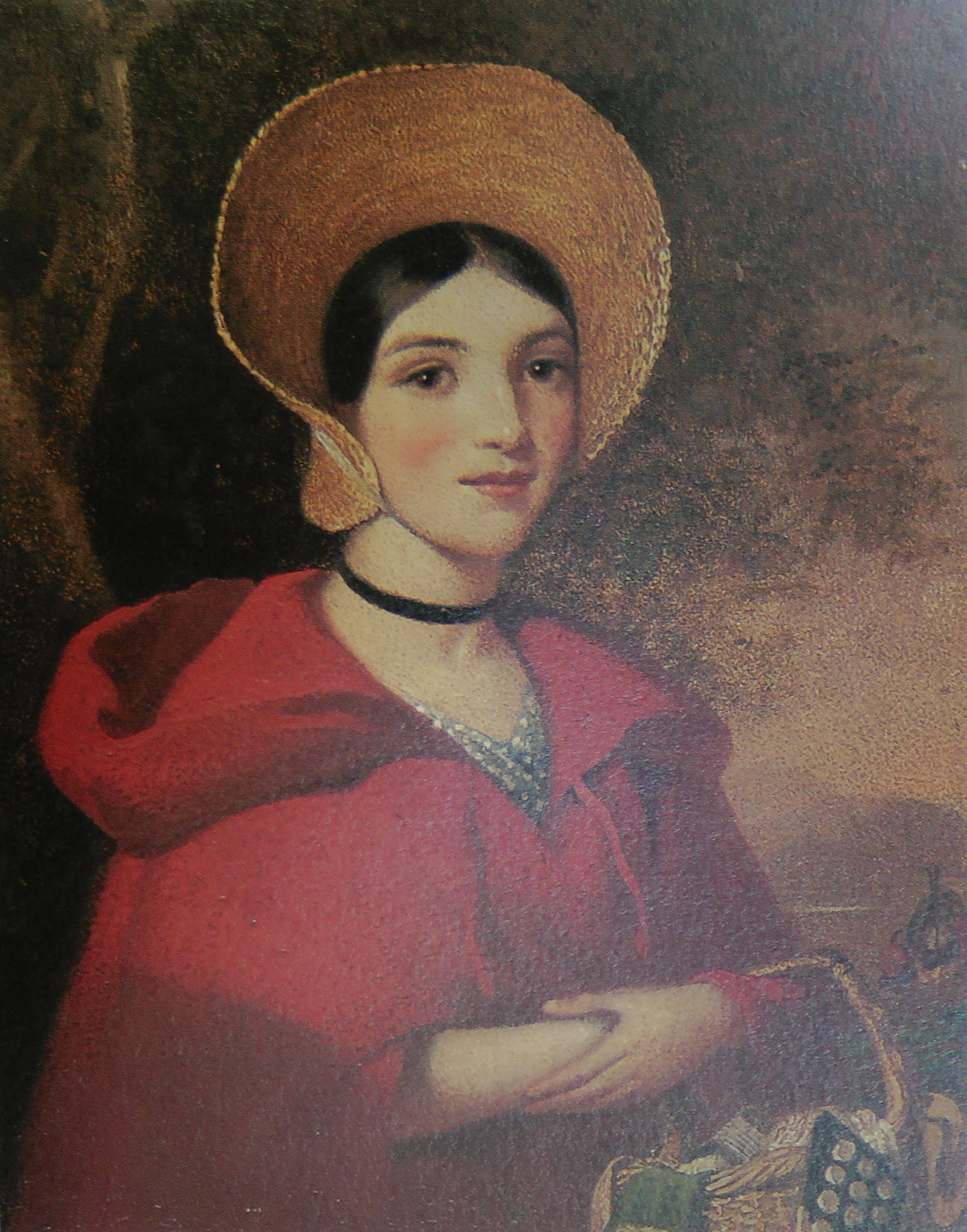
- Clementina Maude, 1838
- Born: Clementina Elphinstone Fleeming; 1 June 1822; Cumbernauld, Dunbartonshire, Scotland
- Died: 19 January 1865 (aged 42); London, England
- Occupation: Photographer
- Spouse: Cornwallis Maude, 4th Viscount Hawarden (m. 1845)
- Children: 8
- Father: Charles Elphinstone Fleeming

Clementina Maude, Viscountess Hawarden (née Elphinstone Fleeming; 1 June 1822 – 19 January 1865), commonly known as Lady Clementina Hawarden, (Note: According to the British peerage she should be referred to as "Clementina, Lady Hawarden", or "Clementina Maude", but today her full styles are rarely used.) was a Scottish amateur portrait photographer of the Victorian era. She produced over 800 photographs mostly of her adolescent daughters.

== Family ==
Clementina was born in Cumbernauld, North Lanarkshire, on 1 June 1822, the third of five children of Admiral Charles Elphinstone Fleeming (1774–1840), and Catalina Paulina Alessandro (1800–1880).

Her father served in the Colombian war of independence, the Venezuelan war of independence, as well as the Revolutionary and Napoleonic wars. He was a member of parliament for Stirlingshire in 1802, and died when Clementina was age 18.

In 1845, she married Cornwallis Maude, 4th Viscount Hawarden, who was an Irish Conservative politician, and they lived mainly in Ireland; the couple had eight girls and two boys.

== Photography ==
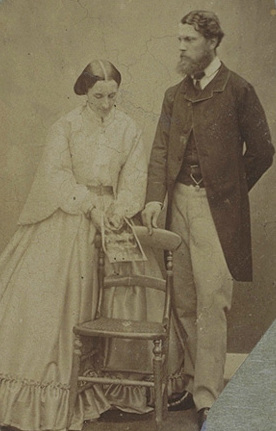
The Viscountess Hawarden and Donald Cameron, 24th Lochiel, 1861.

She turned to photography in late 1856 or, probably, in early 1857, whilst living on the family estate in Dundrum, County Tipperary, Ireland. A move to London in 1859 allowed her to set up a studio in her elegant home in South Kensington. There she took many of the characteristic portraits for which she is principally remembered. Many include her adolescent daughters Isabella Grace, Clementina and Florence Elizabeth. The furniture and characteristic decor of an upper-class London home was removed in order to create mise-en-scene images and theatrical poses within the first floor of her home. Hawarden used mirrors to create a 'body double' and natural sunlight to light her shots, which was 'groundbreaking'. She produced her own albumen prints from wet-plate collodion negatives, a method commonly used at the time.

The Viscountess Hawarden first exhibited in the annual exhibition of the Photographic Society of London in January 1863 and was elected a member of the Society the following March. Her work was acclaimed for its artistic excellence, winning her the silver medal for composition at the exhibition.

She then died of pneumonia before formally collecting it. She was aged 42.

=== Works and legacy ===
At a Grand Fête and Bazaar held to raise funds for a new building for the Royal Female School of Art she set up a booth where she photographed guests, the only known occasion on which she took photographs in public. Lewis Carroll, an admirer of her work, brought two children to be photographed at this booth, and purchased the resulting prints.

Her work is often likened or 'compared favourably' to fellow aristocratic photographer Julia Margaret Cameron, although their aesthetics differ widely, as Cameron put less of an emphasis on composition, backgrounds or props.

Her photographic years were brief but prolific. Hawarden produced over eight hundred photographs between 1857 and her sudden death in 1864. Lady Hawarden's photographic focus remained on her children. There is only one photograph believed to feature the Viscountess herself, yet it could also be a portrait of her sister Anne Bontine.

A collection of 775 portraits were donated to the Victoria and Albert Museum, London in 1939 by Hawarden's granddaughter Clementina Tottenham. The photographs were torn or cut from family albums. This accounts for the torn and trimmed corners which are now considered a hallmark of Hawarden's work. It also indicates that the images were produced for family pleasure, not for commercial gain, which would have been considered inappropriate for 'an elite lady'.

Carol Mavor writes extensively about the place of Hawarden's work in the history of Victorian photography. She states "Hawarden's pictures raise significant issues of gender, motherhood, and sexuality as they relate to photography's inherent attachments to loss, duplication and replication, illusion, fetish."

== Gallery ==
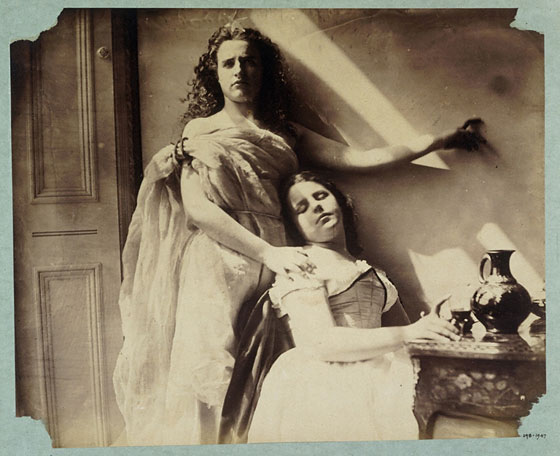
Hawarden-clem-maude-flo-1863-4

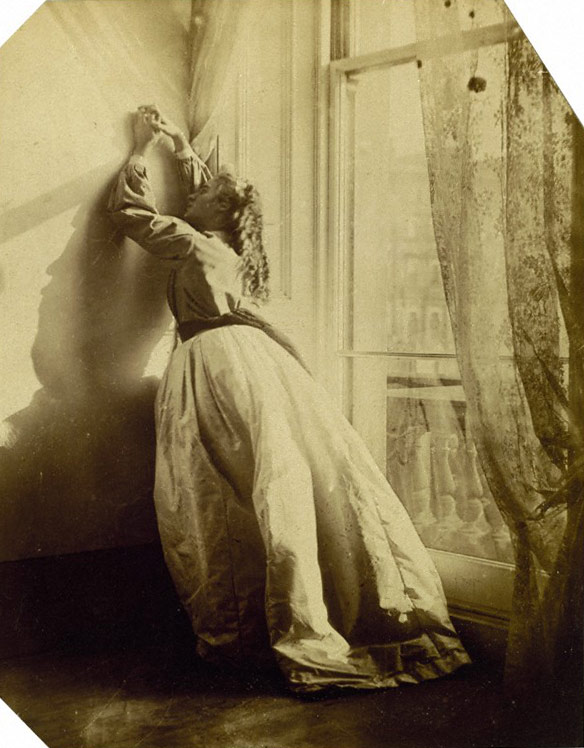
Clementina Hawarden, Clementina Maude

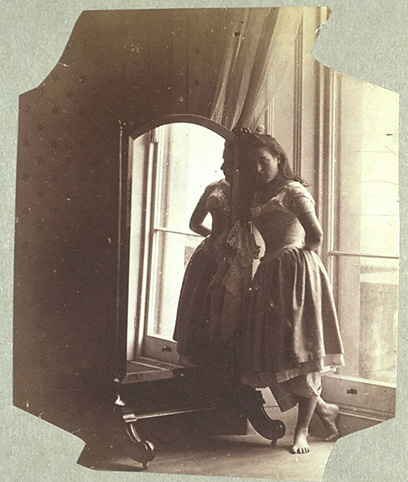
Hawarden-clementina-maude-1862-3-mirror

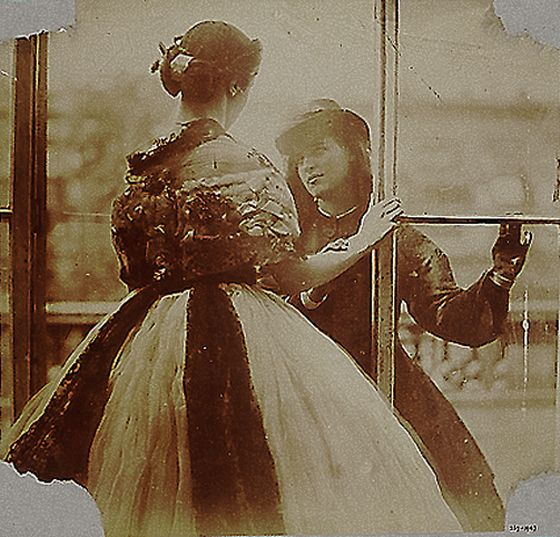
Hawarden1

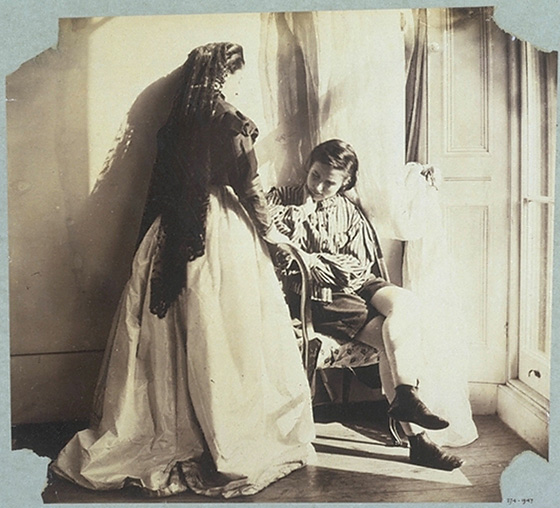
Clementina Hawarden, Clementina Maude and Isabella, 1861

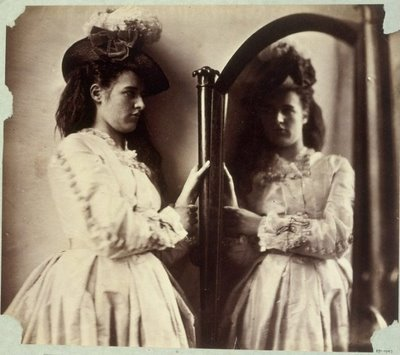
Lady Clementina Hawarden3
