= Viscount Hawarden =

Title in the peerage of Ireland

- Quarterly: 1st and 4th, Azure a Lion rampant Argent (Maude); 2nd and 3rd, Argent three Bars Gemelles Sable over all a Lion rampant Gules charged on the shoulder with a Cross Crosslet fitchée Or
- Creation date: 5 December 1793
- Created by: George III
- Peerage: Peerage of Ireland
- First holder: Sir Cornwallis Maude, 3rd Baronet
- Present holder: Robert Connan Wyndham Leslie Maude, 9th Viscount Hawarden
- Heir apparent: Hon. Varian Maude
- Subsidiary titles: Baron de Montalt; Maude Baronetcy of Dundrum, County Tipperary
- Status: Extant
- Seats: Great Bossington Farm, Kent
- Former seat: Dundrum House
- Motto: Virtute Securus (Safety by manliness)

Viscount Hawarden is a title in the Peerage of Ireland.

== Creation ==
It was created in 1793 for Sir Cornwallis Maude, 3rd Baronet, who had earlier represented the borough of Roscommon in the Irish House of Commons. He had succeeded his older brother, Sir Thomas, as third Baronet of Dundrum. He married Mary, a niece of Ralph Allen, through whom lands in Combe Down, Somerset, came into his family. His son, the third Viscount, sat in the House of Lords as an Irish representative peer from 1836 to 1850. His son, the fourth Viscount, was an Irish Representative Peer from 1862 to 1886 and served as a government whip from 1866 to 1868 and from 1874 to 1880 in the Conservative administrations of the Earl of Derby and Benjamin Disraeli. In 1886 the fourth Viscount was created Earl de Montalt, of Dundrum in the County of Tipperary, in the Peerage of the United Kingdom. However, this title became extinct on his death in 1905 while he was succeeded in his other titles by his cousin, the fifth Viscount. He was the eldest son of the Very Reverend the Hon. Robert William Henry Maude, second son of the first Viscount. His son, the sixth Viscount, was killed at an early age in France during the First World War while serving as a lieutenant in the Coldstream Guards and was succeeded by his cousin, the seventh Viscount. He was the son of Ludlow Eustace Maude, younger son of the aforementioned Robert William Henry Maude. As of 2010 the titles are held by the latter's grandson, the ninth Viscount, who succeeded his father in 1991.

The Maude Baronetcy, of Dundrum in the County of Tipperary, was created in the Baronetage of Ireland on 9 May 1705 for the first Viscount's father Robert Maude. He represented Gowran, Canice and Bangor in the Irish House of Commons. His eldest son, the second Baronet, sat as a Member of the Irish Parliament for County Tipperary. In 1776 he was created Baron de Montalt, of Hawarden in the County of Tipperary, in the Peerage of Ireland. However, this title became extinct on his death in 1777 while he was succeeded in the baronetcy by his younger brother, the aforementioned third Baronet, for whom the barony was revived in 1785.

== Family Seat ==
The family seat is Great Bossington Farm, near Adisham, Kent.

The former was Dundrum House, an eighteenth-century Palladian house in the style of Sir Edward Lovett Pearce, near Cashel, County Tipperary. An extra storey was added to the house c.1890 by 4th Viscount Hawarden. After being sold by the Maude family in 1908, the house became a convent. In 1981, it became a hotel.

== Maude Baronets, of Dundrum (1705) ==
- Sir Robert Maude, 1st Baronet (died 1750)
- Sir Thomas Maude, 2nd Baronet (1727–1777) (created Baron de Montalt in 1776)

== Barons de Montalt (1777) ==
- Thomas Maude, 1st Baron de Montalt (1727–1777)

== Maude Baronets, of Dundrum (1705; Reverted) ==
- Sir Cornwallis Maude, 3rd Baronet (1729–1803) (created Viscount Hawarden in 1793)

== Viscounts Hawarden (1793) ==
- Cornwallis Maude, 1st Viscount Hawarden (1729–1803)
- Thomas Ralph Maude, 2nd Viscount Hawarden (1767–1807)
- Cornwallis Maude, 3rd Viscount Hawarden (1780–1856)
- Cornwallis Maude, 4th Viscount Hawarden (1817–1905) (created Earl de Montalt in 1886)

== Earls de Montalt (1886) ==
- Cornwallis Maude, 1st Earl de Montalt (1817–1905)

== Viscounts Hawarden (1793; Reverted) ==
- Robert Henry Maude, 5th Viscount Hawarden (1842–1908)
- Robert Cornwallis Maude, 6th Viscount Hawarden (1890–1914)
- Eustace Wyndham Maude, 7th Viscount Hawarden (1877–1958)
- Robert Leslie Eustace Maude, 8th Viscount Hawarden (1926–1991)
- Robert Connan Wyndham Leslie Maude, 9th Viscount Hawarden (born 1961)

The heir apparent is the present viscount's son, Hon. Varian John Connon Eustace Maude (born 1997)
