= Greenland, Arkansas =

- City
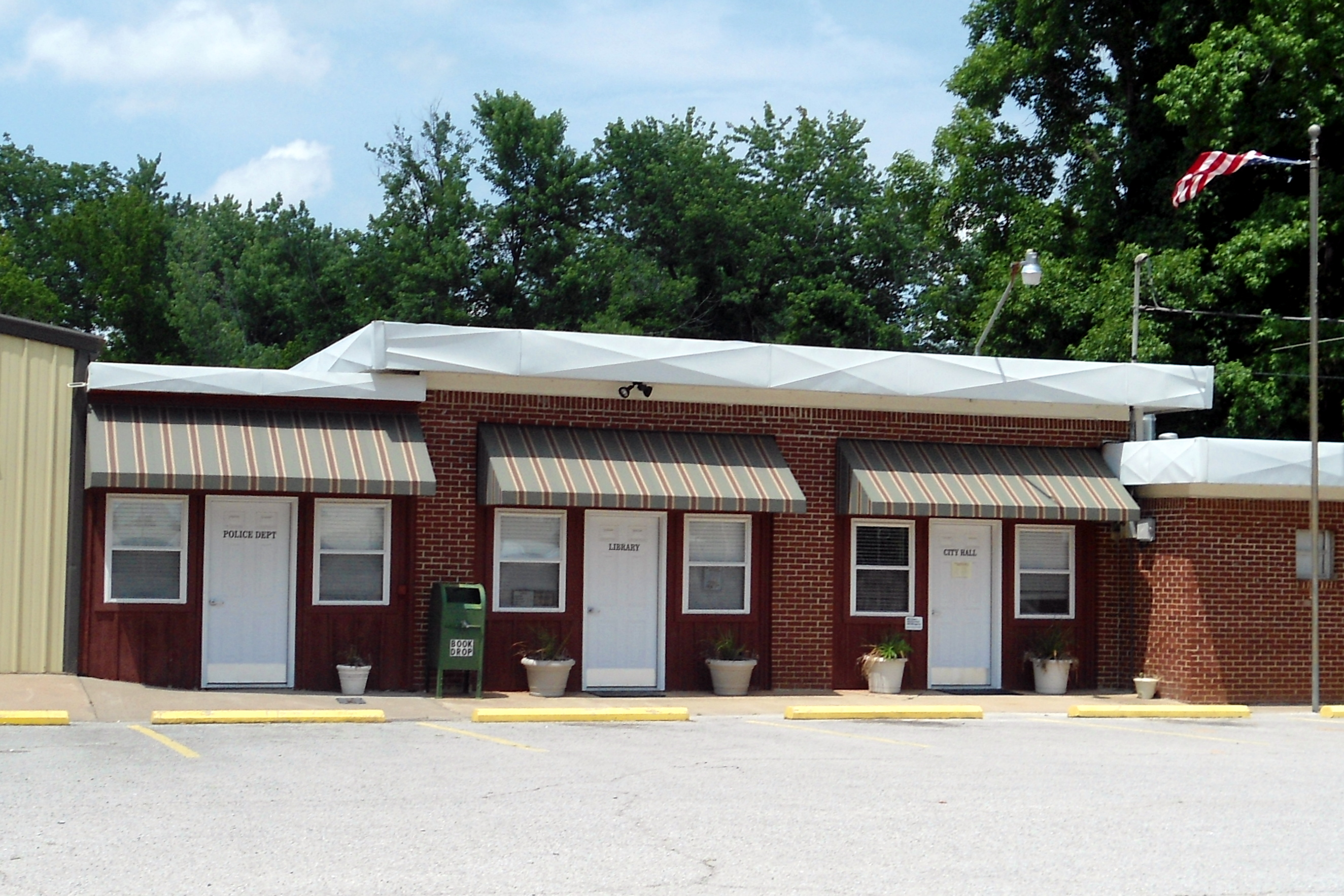
- Police department, library, and city hall

- Seal

- Location of Greenland in Washington County, Arkansas.
- Coordinates: 35°59′47″N 94°11′19″W
- Country: United States
- State: Arkansas
- County: Washington

Government
  - Mayor: Jim Renfrow

Area
  - City: 4.05 sq mi (10.48 km^{2})
  - Land: 4.01 sq mi (10.39 km^{2})
  - Water: 0.035 sq mi (0.09 km^{2})
- Elevation: 1,293 ft (394 m)

Population (2020)
  - City: 1,213
  - Estimate (2025): 1,244 ▲
  - Density: 302.2/sq mi (116.69/km^{2})
  - Metro: 463,204
- Time zone: UTC-6 (Central (CST))
  - Summer (DST): UTC-5 (CDT)
- ZIP code: 72737
- Area code: 479
- FIPS code: 05-28660
- GNIS feature ID: 2403742
- Website: greenlandar.gov

Greenland is a city in Washington County, Arkansas, United States. The population is 1,213 as of the 2020 census. The community is located in the Boston Mountains, within the Ozark Mountains.

== History ==
Early settlers found prosperity by growing fruit, including apples and a variety of berries, and raising chickens. The completion of the St. Louis–San Francisco Railway through the mountains in 1882 further grew the local economy, leading Greenland to incorporate in 1910. Located immediately south of Fayetteville in the Northwest Arkansas metropolitan statistical area, Greenland has been experiencing a population boom in recent years, as indicated by a 39% growth in population between the 2000 and 2010 censuses, almost exclusively Hispanic.

== Geography ==
According to the United States Census Bureau, the city has a total area of 2.7 square miles (7.0 km^{2}), of which 2.7 square miles (7.0 km^{2}) is land and 0.37% is water.

=== Climate ===
The climate in this area is characterized by hot, extremely humid summers and generally cool to very cold winters depending on elevation. According to the Köppen Climate Classification system, Greenland has a humid subtropical climate, abbreviated "Cfa" on climate maps.

== Demographics ==
Historical population
Census	Pop.	Note	%±
1910	108		—
1920	147		36.1%
1930	127		−13.6%
1940	114		−10.2%
1950	164		43.9%
1960	127		−22.6%
1970	650		411.8%
1980	622		−4.3%
1990	757		21.7%
2000	907		19.8%
2010	1,259		38.8%
2020	1,213		−3.7%
2025 (est.)	1,244	▲	2.6%
U.S. Decennial Census

=== 2020 census ===
As of the 2020 census, Greenland had a population of 1,213. The median age was 38.7 years. 24.4% of residents were under the age of 18 and 15.4% of residents were 65 years of age or older. For every 100 females there were 89.5 males, and for every 100 females age 18 and over there were 89.5 males age 18 and over.

13.4% of residents lived in urban areas, while 86.6% lived in rural areas.

There were 469 households in Greenland, of which 35.6% had children under the age of 18 living in them. Of all households, 52.5% were married-couple households, 17.3% were households with a male householder and no spouse or partner present, and 24.5% were households with a female householder and no spouse or partner present. About 25.4% of all households were made up of individuals and 10.0% had someone living alone who was 65 years of age or older.

There were 511 housing units, of which 8.2% were vacant. The homeowner vacancy rate was 2.6% and the rental vacancy rate was 6.7%.

Racial composition as of the 2020 census
Race	Number	Percent
White	1,034	85.2%
Black or African American	30	2.5%
American Indian and Alaska Native	17	1.4%
Asian	8	0.7%
Native Hawaiian and Other Pacific Islander	5	0.4%
Some other race	14	1.2%
Two or more races	105	8.7%
Hispanic or Latino (of any race)	60	4.9%

=== 2000 census ===
As of the census of 2000, there were 907 people, 335 households, and 259 families residing in the city. The population density was 331.9 inhabitants per square mile (128.1/km^{2}). There were 361 housing units at an average density of 132.1 per square mile (51.0/km^{2}). The racial makeup of the city was 95.48% White, 1.10% Black or African American, 1.21% Native American, 0.44% Asian, 0.55% from other races, and 1.21% from two or more races. 2.21% of the population were Hispanic or Latino of any race.

There were 335 households, out of which 38.8% had children under the age of 18 living with them, 61.2% were married couples living together, 18.2% had a female householder with no husband present, and 22.4% were non-families. 19.1% of all households were made up of individuals, and 7.5% had someone living alone who was 65 years of age or older. The average household size was 2.71 and the average family size was 3.08. In the city, 61% were indicated to have received a high school diploma, 9% to have received a bachelor's degree, almost exclusively from U of A.

In the city, the population was spread out, with 28.6% under the age of 18, 8.3% from 18 to 24, 31.2% from 25 to 44, 21.7% from 45 to 64, and 10.3% who were 65 years of age or older. The median age was 35 years. For every 100 females, there were 98.5 males. For every 100 females age 18 and over, there were 94.0 males.

The median income for a household in the city was $27,643, and the median income for a family was $33,875. Males had a median income of $22,750 versus $13,750 for females, indicative of the large income disparity among males and females living in the region. The per capita income for the city was $16,127. About 65.9% of families and 47.3% of the population were below the poverty line, including 52.2% of those under age 18 and 67.3% of those age 65 or over.

== Education ==
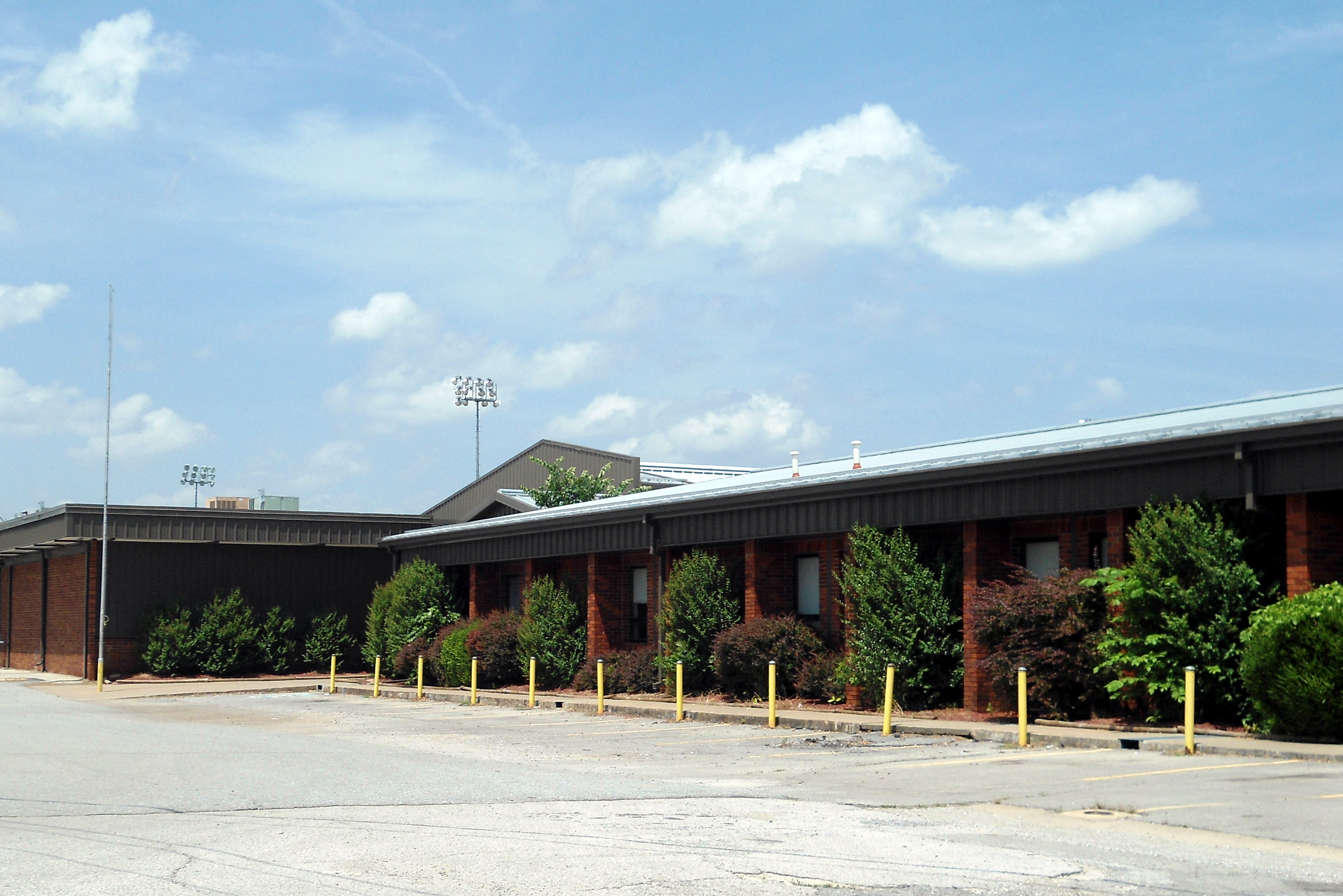
Greenland High School

Greenland School District operates area public schools for Greenland. This includes Greenland High School.

== Infrastructure ==
=== Transit ===
As of 2023, there is no fixed route transit service in Greenland. Ozark Regional Transit operates demand-response service in the city. The nearest intercity bus service is provided by Jefferson Lines in nearby Fayetteville.

=== Roadways ===
Located south of Fayetteville, the city is served by Interstate 49 (I-49) along the western edge and by US Highway 71 (US 71) through central Greenland. Together, these routes form the Boston Mountains Scenic Loop, one of eleven scenic byways in the state. Highway 265 runs in extreme western Greenland as the Butterfield Overland Mail Arkansas Heritage Trail.

=== Aviation ===
Drake Field, owned and operated by the city of Fayetteville, borders the east side of the city. Formerly Northwest Arkansas's primary aviation facility until the construction of Northwest Arkansas Regional Airport, Drake Field provides general aviation services.
