= Maude Cary =

American Christian missionary

Maude Cary (1878–1967) was a Christian American missionary to North Africa, specifically Morocco. She was raised knowing she would one day be a missionary because her parents often housed missionaries as they were passing through. Her parents understood the work they were doing as very important and passed this belief onto their daughter. As soon as she was eighteen, Maude signed herself up for an American missionary training school, Avant Ministries (GMU). After completing this schooling and doing some missions work within American inner cities, Maude was accepted to travel with the GMU to serve alongside a few struggling Christian missionaries in Morocco. For the next fifty years of her life Maude Cary would minister to the rich and poor Muslims within Morocco attempting to bring them the Gospel message her school and parents had taught her. A difficult start made Maude question her effectiveness in Morocco but she trusted that there would eventually be conversions from Islam to Christianity and stayed until she was too ill to serve. Becoming very ill she flew back to America for treatment and as soon as possible returned to continue her life living among the Muslims. Through the difficult start and her illness, Maude Cary became a Christian leader within Morocco for the Gospel Mission Union in charge of translation and Bible schools. She eventually became too sick to continue and returned to the United States. Her hard work in Morocco may not have produced many conversions during her stay there, but there were a few conversions which were seen as a success, and continued the Christian influence within the country long after her life. After fifty years of service Maude returned to the United States because of her illness, and died in 1967.

== Family ==
Maude Cary began her life on a Kansas farm in 1878. She was born within a Judeo-Christian family to Jedediah and Sarah Cary who saw an importance in the Christian mission movement. Jedediah, is described as a "gentle, quiet man." He did not have the best of luck as he lost most of the family's money and for the rest of his life raised his family on a poor farm in Kansas. Sarah Cary was said to be "an independent woman, was a talented musician... and an outstanding Bible teacher." Maude's passion for the Christian mission movement was gained through the many traveling missionaries that visited their farm and stayed for a few days. "At age of eighteen she enrolled at the GMU Bible Institute in Kansas City, Missouri, to be trained for a ministry in overseas missions." Maude Cary remained single for her entire life. She was engaged to a missionary in Morocco, George Reed, although he had second thoughts and unofficially called off the engagement by moving to minister to a different tribe and never spoke to Maude again. She did desire to be married but is said to have finally, "accepted her fate of being an 'old maid missionary.'"

== Training ==
While Maude Cary worked through her training at GMU Bible Institute she practiced what was being taught. She was quick to devote herself to practical learning experiences within America. She, along with others, would get up quite early, often missing meals, to spend time in prayer before God for the people around the world that had not heard the Gospel message. They also wanted to ensure that there was nothing between them and God that would hinder the spreading of the message they believed needed to be told around the world. Anticipating her time to leave America and be a Christian missionary abroad she studied different languages and was said to have been a "natural linguist." Because Gospel Missionary Union was training teams to go to Morocco, "in addition to her language study in Arabic, she was studying the language of the Berbers, an ancient tribe that inhabited the area long before the Arabs moved across North Africa." Maude devoted much of her time to studies knowing that one day she would travel to Morocco and anticipated never returning to America. She was ready to take this step with the message her God had given her whenever an organization would accept her.

== First missions activities ==
Before Maude was sent as a missionary to Northern Africa her school instructed her to help the less fortunate within the United States of America. Being sent first to Leavenworth, Kansas, Maude along with several other girls "held weekly Bible classes, visited homes and hospitals and conducted young people's missionary meetings." Although they were met with opposition they continued ministering until being sent to Hastings, Nebraska. Once again they were received with opposition and yet Maude did not become discouraged knowing that she was learning and would soon be headed to Africa. "Early in the fall of 1901 another party was organized to join the missionary team struggling to gain a foothold in Morocco. Among the group was a quiet, pleasant girl named Maude Cary." Maude Cary believed she was ready. She had been waiting for this news ever since leaving home at age eighteen. Her mom, Sarah Cary, was overjoyed upon the arrival of the news. Her daughter was finally headed to Africa to be a missionary and preach this Gospel that her parents had instilled within her. Maude's father took the news much harder but trusted in the Lord to protect his daughter as she traveled.

== Missions in Morocco ==
Missionary activities in Morocco proved to be harder than they were in the United States, and the opposition did not disappear as Maude had hoped. There was a group of single women who could fully devote themselves to the mission and yet this quality "that made them... supremely capable for missionary service [was] viewed with suspicion by their weaker sisters and [was] threatening to their male colleagues." Within her team there was competition amongst the females and the males to gain the better scores on language tests. "The fact that she outscored a male counterpart in language study, combined with her tendency toward gaiety, friendliness, and laughter and pride of dress, led to an internal mission board decision that she should return home." Maude was crushed with this news and yet would not give up either. Finally convincing the GMU's board she should stay, Maude desired to settle in and not let anything or anyone make her leave Morocco. This was the place she believed God had called her to live and serve as a missionary.

Not only did Maude face attack from within the organization but from the locals as well as Maude was teaching a different belief system than the one they held to. As Maude would share her Gospel message with them, the locals would threaten to take her life. Maude was asking these Muslims to change their whole belief system and this was worthy of death. At one point the political situation created such a dangerous environment that Maude and the other missionaries with her were forced to move to the coast away from the few Muslims that had befriended them. For many years Maude was faithful and witnessed with her Christian gospel to the Muslims around her without seeing any converts to Christianity. She felt very much like a failure as she did not always act as the missions organization asked her to and at times believed that "the mission would have been better off without her." But she continued to serve faithfully. She had moved to Africa for life and would continue to minister when she was given the opportunity. It was not until she had served for twenty-three years that Maude Cary returned to the United States on furlough. This break in the United States was a good time of reflection for Cary as she looked back over her many years of service. The outcome looked bleak as there was no Christian church founded and Islam was still the primary belief system within the whole of Morocco. But Maude Cary was convinced that it was worth the hard work and that one day the dominance that Islam had would be broken and would stand alongside Christianity. Because of this belief, she returned to Morocco continually praying for more missionaries to join her.

World War II began while Maude Cary was in Morocco and "all the missionaries were evacuated expect for herself and three other single women. She was placed in charge of the work." The situation was difficult as the men left the country to fight in the war, but Maude and the three other single women continued in their prayers for helpers while preaching to the Moroccans and taking on the ministry of the men. "Faithfully Maude witnessed for Christ to rich and poor, whether they listened eagerly or not... she worked extra hours translating and correcting hymns in the language of the common people." Although the borders were closed during the war none of the previous mission work went to waste. Maude Cary and the three other women saw a glimpse of hope when seven missionaries applied for visas in April 1945. When the war ended and the borders were opened again more missionaries came and the four single women saw their prayers answered. Maude "conducted language school and helped new recruits become situated." Although her beginning was in frustration and pain she was now teaching others and creating a Christian impact within Morocco. There were signs of hope for the Christian missionaries during these times as well as Lejb Feldman and Mehdi Ksara converted from Islam to Christianity after hearing the Gospel presented by Maude. Both men were shunned in their towns as they rejected Islam and yet found confidence in their faith through Maude's teaching.

In "1951 a Bible institute was organized to train young Moroccan men," and that same year Miss. Cary became very ill and once again had to fly back to America, but this time for treatment. Determined, Maude could not give up on the influence she had created within Morocco and one year later, at age seventy-four, flew back to Morocco. "For three years she continued her ministry, but due to recurring health problems the mission began arranging for her retirement" and she departed in 1955.

== Morocco ==
When Maude Cary first arrived in Morocco the country was in unrest. Although it is a North African country, in religion and race it has a Middle Eastern climate. It is now an Arab state and "is the westernmost country in North Africa. Morocco's population is the second largest." Some Moroccans do not know if they should think of themselves as African or Arab as both appear to be important within their country. The poverty that has plagued the country has not aided in this situation only causing the people to follow or do whatever it takes to stay alive. During Maude Cary's stay in Morocco, conversions from Islam to Christianity were very few and yet "the era for freely and openly proclaiming the gospel in Morocco lasted twelve very fruitful years. It began with a marked rise in interest the year miss Cary retired, and it ended the year she died!"

== Gospel Mission Union ==
Gospel Missionary Union (GMU), now known as Avant Ministries, began as a movement of Christian missionaries from America traveling to North Africa and South America preaching the Christian Gospel. "The World's Gospel Union (Gospel Missionary Union) emerged from a Bible study held for members of a Kansas YMCA in June 1889. Upon hearing of the Sudan and its estimated 90 million souls without an evangelist, several people offered themselves as missionaries." Because this mission organization began close to Maude's home, and her parents were welcoming to missionaries, it would have been an obvious choice for her to attend the school they had started and then to later travel with them to Morocco.
