= William Johnson (Irish politician) =

Irish politician

William Johnson (1760–1845) was an Irish politician, law officer and judge of the early nineteenth century. He sat in the Irish House of Commons, served as Serjeant-at-law (Ireland) and was a justice of the Court of Common Pleas (Ireland).

He was born in Dublin, probably at Fishamble Street, the fifth son of Thomas Johnson, an apothecary who in later life qualified as a physician. Thomas was described as a "good, orthodox, hard-praying Protestant", but who was rather self-conscious about his humble origins. William's eldest brother was Robert Johnson (1745-1833), who had a very similar career to William, being an MP and a justice of the Court of Common Pleas. Robert's career was destroyed in 1805 when he was convicted of seditious libel and forced to resign from the Bench, for having written a number of pseudonymous letters attacking the Government (the so-called "Juverna" affair). Robert's disgrace adversely affected William's career, and he had to wait long years before his own elevation to the Bench. The two brothers married sisters, Susan and Margaret Evans, daughters of John Evans of Dublin, and both had issue.

William was educated at Trinity College Dublin, where he graduated Bachelor of Laws in 1784, and entered Lincoln's Inn in 1782. He was called to the Irish Bar in 1784, and became King's Counsel in 1808. He became Third Serjeant in 1813, Second Serjeant in 1814 and First Serjeant in 1816.

His political career was brief: he entered the Commons as member for the borough of Roscommon in 1799, but his career in Parliament ended with the Act of Union 1801, which he actively supported. He was appointed a justice of the Court of Common Pleas in 1817, and served until 1841. It was generally agreed that his appointment would have come much sooner but for his brother's disgrace. He was a member of the Royal Irish Academy. Unlike most judges of the time he did not have a country "place", preferring to live entirely in Dublin city. He died at Dun Laoghaire in 1845.

He was regarded as a much abler lawyer than his brother, and was generally respected, although critics said that he could be arrogant, morose, coarse and bad-tempered. The statesman Henry Grattan, who knew the Johnson family well, wrote that while William had his faults, he had never forgotten William's great kindness to him when Grattan was seriously ill.

== Sources ==
- Ball, F. Elrington. The Judges in Ireland 1221-1921 London John Murray 1926
- Hart, A.R. A History of the King's Serjeants-at-law in Ireland Dublin Four Courts Press 2000
- Memoirs of the life and times of the Right Hon. Henry Grattan Vol. 5 1846
- Woods, C.J. "Johnson, Robert" Cambridge Dictionary of National Biography 2009
