= Roscommon (Parliament of Ireland constituency) =

Pre-1801 Irish constituency

- Former borough constituency for the Irish House of Commons
- County: County Roscommon
- Borough: Roscommon

–1801
- Seats: 2
- Replaced by: Disfranchised

Roscommon was a constituency representing the parliamentary borough of Roscommon in the Irish House of Commons from 1611 to 1800. Between 1725 and 1793 Catholics and those married to Catholics could not vote.

== Members of Parliament ==
- 1613–1615 Maurice Smith and William Marwood
- 1634–1635 George Carr and Edward Deane
- 1639–1649 Robert Bysse and Walter Loftus (died 1641)
- 1661–1666 Oliver Jones and William Somers

=== 1689–1801 ===
Election	First MP	Second MP
1689	John Dillon	John Kelly
1692	Hercules Davys	Henry Sandford
1695	Sir Arthur Cole, 2nd Bt	Henry Sandford
September 1703	Robert Sandys	Henry Sandford
1703	William Westgarth	Henry Sandford
1711	David Kennedy	Henry Sandford
1713	Edward Crofton	Henry Sandford
1733	Edward Crofton	William Sandford
1740	Thomas Mahon	William Sandford
1759	Thomas Mahon	Edward Sandford
1761	Sir Marcus Lowther-Crofton, 1st Bt	Sir FitzGerald Aylmer, 6th Bt
1768	Nathaniel Clements	Robert Sandford
1769	Robert Tighe	Robert Sandford
1776	Henry Sandford	Robert Sandford
1783	Sir Cornwallis Maude, 3rd Bt	George Sandford
1785	Maurice Coppinger	George Sandford
1790	Hon. Nathaniel Clements	George Sandford
1791	Henry Sandford	George Sandford
January 1798	Henry Sandford	Silver Oliver
1798	Henry Sandford	George Sandford
1799	Henry Sandford	William Johnson
1801	Constituency disenfranchised	
