= Thomas Maude, 1st Baron de Montalt =

Anglo-Irish politician (died 1777)

Thomas Maude, 1st Baron de Montalt (c. 1727 – 17 May 1777) was an Anglo-Irish politician.

Montalt was the son of Sir Robert Maude, 1st Baronet and Eleanor Cornwallis, daughter of Thomas Cornwallis and Emma Charlton. He succeeded to his father's baronetcy on 4 August 1750. He was elected to the Irish House of Commons as the Member of Parliament for County Tipperary in 1761 and sat until 1776. In 1765 Montalt held the office of High Sheriff of Tipperary and was invested as a member of the Privy Council of Ireland in 1768. On 18 July 1776 he was created Baron de Montalt of Hawarden in the Peerage of Ireland.

He never married and upon his death his barony became extinct. His estate and baronetcy were inherited by his younger brother, Cornwallis Maude, 1st Viscount Hawarden.

Parliament of Ireland
Preceded by Stephen Moore	Member of Parliament for County Tipperary; 1761–1776	Succeeded by Henry Prittie
Peerage of Ireland
New creation	Baron de Montalt; 1776–1777	Extinct
Baronetage of Ireland
Preceded by Robert Maude	Baronet (of Dundrum); 1750–1777	Succeeded by Cornwallis Maude
