= Thomas Maude (clergyman) =

English clergyman (1801–1865)

Thomas Maude (1801–1865) was an English clergyman, writer and poet.

== Life ==
He was the son of Thomas Maude (1770–1831) of Newcastle upon Tyne, a partner in the Tyne Bank, and his wife Jane Roxby, daughter of Henry Roxby of Clapham Rise and niece of Sir James Sanderson, 1st Baronet. He was a student at University College, Oxford, matriculating in 1819 at age 17. He graduated B.A. in 1822, M.A. in 1827, and entered the Inner Temple in 1826.

Maude was ordained deacon in 1834, and priest in 1835. He was assistant curate at Birmingham St Thomas in 1834, and curate at St Paul Covent Garden in 1835. He was presented to the rectory of Elvington, City of York in 1841.

== Works ==
Maude published:

- A Legend of Ravenswood and other Poems, 1823;
- Monody on the Death of Lord Byron, 1824;
- The Memorial and other Poems, 1824;
- Letter to a Member of the New Opposition, 1827;
- An Apology for the System of Public and Classical Education, 1828: "away then with the drivelling cant and trash talked against our ancient classical institutions".
- The Traveller's Lay, 1830, poem;
- The Schoolboy, 1836, poem; and
- Five Sermons, 1839–1847.
- Speculum: a Byronic satire on some residents of the city of Durham, published 1969

As a poet, his name was coupled in the Fraserian Papers with those of Edwin Atherstone, Edward Ball and Robert Montgomery.

Internet Archive has a copy of The village grammar-school; and other poems, published in 1824, albeit incorrectly associated with Thomas Maude (1718–1798).

== Family ==
Maude married Elizabeth Stewart Hay, in 1835. The daughter of David Stewart Hay of Perth, Scotland, she was the niece of James Laing of Dominica, and counter-claimant under his will.
