= Thomas Maude (estate manager) =

British physician and estate steward

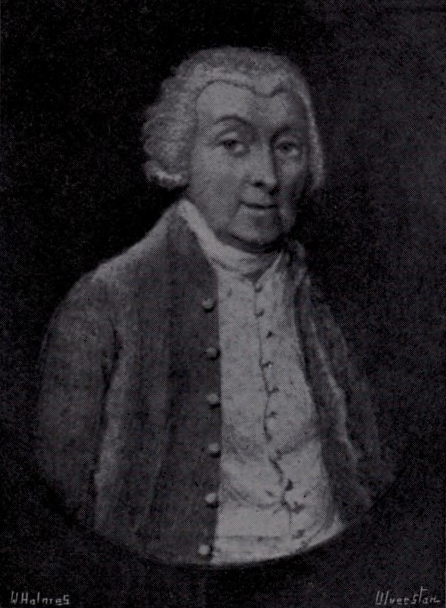
Thomas Maude

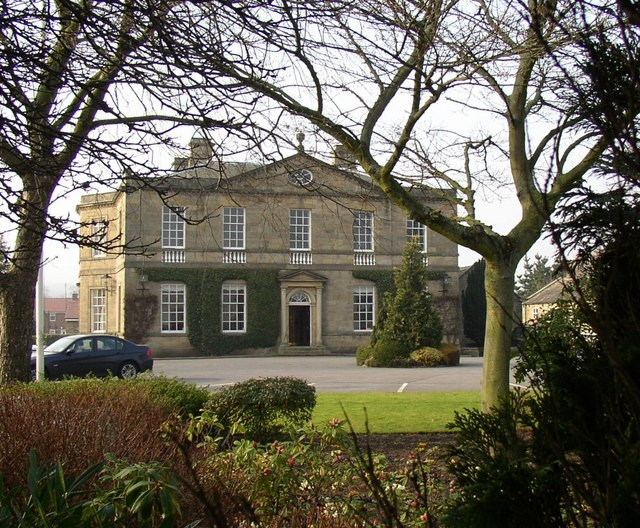
Burley New Hall aka Burley House, constructed in 1783 for Maude

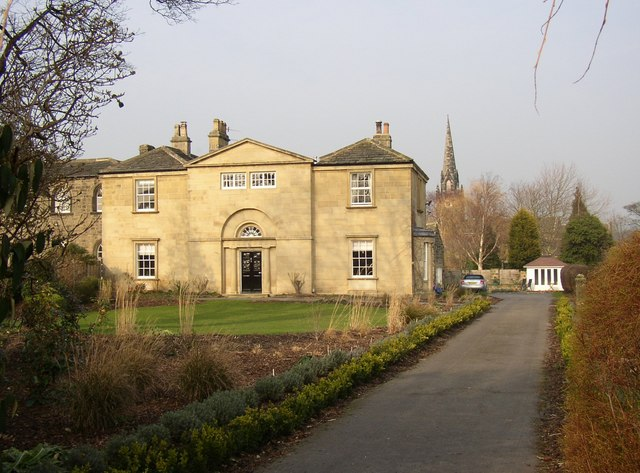
Burley Lodge, gatehouse for the hall, constructed for Maude

Thomas Maude (1718–1798) was a British physician, estate steward, and minor poet and essayist.

== Biography ==
Thomas Maude was, according to Charlotte Fell Smith, author of Maude's Dictionary of National Biography (DNB) entry, a member of the ancient family of Maude of Alverthorpe and Wakefield, Yorkshire. (Note: Maude of Alverthorpe and Wakefield: See Burke, John (1835). A genealogical and heraldic history of the commoners of Great Britain and Ireland, enjoying territorial possessions or high official rank; but uninvested with heritable honours. London, H. Colburn; [etc., etc.] p. 84.) Speight, in Upper Wharfedale, notes Maude's familial connection with Burley in Wharfedale in the context of a large oval tablet erected in Burley Church in 1781, to the memory of his ancestors, of whom is mentioned William Maude, gent., born A.D. 1588 "in his paternal mansion at Burley, where he died in 1661".

Maude's place of birth is disputed. The DNB, citing Gentleman's Magazine (1841) asserts he was born in Downing Street, Westminster, during May 1718. Taylor, in Biographia Leodiensis, probably following Jones in The history and antiquities of Harewood, suggests Harewood, West Yorkshire as a place of birth with Westminster less likely. (Note: Harewood as birthplace is supported by Maude's poem 'Wensleydale': In yonder fields, near Harewood's splendid dome, Where pleasure dwells and freedom feels at home, Where ease and elegance their charms combine, And sister arts in happy union twine, I sportive ranged; there sipped parental dew, When first life's coinage current-value knew,) The Oxford Dictionary of National Biography (ODNB) specifies Downing Street as his birthplace, noting that Maude retained ownership of his family property there, using it as a base when in London.

Maude entered the medical profession. In 1755 he was appointed surgeon on board the Barfleur, commanded by Lord Harry Powlett. Maude's favourable evidence at a court-martial before which Lord Harry was tried at Portsmouth in October 1755 was so highly valued by his commander that upon his succession as sixth and last Duke of Bolton in 1765 he appointed Maude steward of his Yorkshire estates. (Note: A contributor in The Gentleman's Magazine of June 1841 notes that Maude's court-martial evidence probably saved Powlett's life. Capital punishment was mandated for officers who did not do their utmost against the enemy, either in battle or pursuit. A court-martial in the following year sentenced John Byng to death for not doing his utmost to engage or destroy the enemy, and Byng was executed in March 1757.) This post he held, residing at Bolton Hall, Wensleydale, until the death of the duke in 1794. He then retired to Burley Hall, at Burley in Wharfedale, where he died in December 1798, aged 80. (Note: Burley Hall, in contemporary times known as Burley House, was constructed in 1783 for Maude, and known then as Burley New Hall. 53.91080°N 1.74228°E) He was buried in Wensley churchyard; lines from Oliver Goldsmith's The Deserted Village are engraved on his tomb. Although the DNB specifies Maude was unmarried, the ODNB asserts Maude married on 6 August 1746 Cordelia Charlton, at St Mary Magdalen Old Fish Street, and that the couple had one son and two daughters.

Maude's accomplishments were, according to the DNB, inconsiderable, but he was esteemed for his love of ‘letters and of man.’ His verses are mainly descriptive of the Yorkshire dales. He contributed to Francis Grose's Antiquities the information about Bolton Castle and Wensleydale. Grose, who was his friend, quotes from 'Wharfedale' in illustration of Aysgarth Bridge. William Paley, Anglican clergyman, also visited Maude at Bolton. In addition to Burley Hall, Maude commissioned Burley Lodge, (Note: Burley Lodge: 53.91131°N 1.74157°E) which formed a gatehouse to the hall.

Maude is noted as an acquaintance of Edward Ives, a fellow naval surgeon.

== Works ==
Maude's works are:

- Wensleydale, or Rural Contemplations; a Poem, published for the benefit of Leeds General Infirmary - 1771 edition, 1772 edition, 1798 4th edition
- An Account of the Cowthorpe Oak, near Weatherby, Yorks, 1774. See Opuscula Botanica, vol. clxiv.
- Verbeia, or Wharfedale; a Poem descriptive and didactic, 1782, 4to.
- Viator; a Journey from London to Scarborough by way of York; a Poem, with notes historical and topographical, 1782, 4to.
- The Invitation, or Urbanity; a Poem, 1791, 4to.
- The Reaper; a collection of Essays, &c., some of which were originally published in the York Courant, 1797. Enlarged and printed for the benefit of the Otley and Burley Sunday-schools, 2 vols. 8vo, York, 1798, but never published in consequence of the author's death. The second volume ends abruptly at p. 100. Two copies only were issued, of which one, with manuscript notes by W. Blanchard, the printer, is in the British Museum.
