= Cornwallis Maude, 1st Viscount Hawarden =

Anglo-Irish politician and peer

Cornwallis Maude, 1st Viscount Hawarden (19 September 1729 – 23 August 1803) was an Anglo-Irish peer and politician.

Hawarden was the second son of Sir Robert Maude, 1st Baronet and his wife, Eleanor Cornwallis, daughter of Thomas Cornwallis and Emma Charlton.

Hawarden succeeded to the baronetcy following the death of his unmarried older brother, Thomas Maude, 1st Baron de Montalt, in 1777. He served as the Member of Parliament for Roscommon in the Irish House of Commons between 1783 and 1785. He was created Baron de Montalt of Hawarden in the Peerage of Ireland on 29 June 1785. He was further honoured when he was created Viscount Hawarden, also in the Peerage of Ireland, on 5 December 1793.

He had 16 children with three wives.

Parliament of Ireland
Preceded by Henry Moore Sandford; Robert Sandford	Member of Parliament for Roscommon; 1783–1785; With: George Sandford	Succeeded by Maurice Copinger; George Sandford
Peerage of Ireland
New creation	Viscount Hawarden; 1793–1803	Succeeded by Thomas Ralph Maude
New creation	Baron de Montalt; 1785–1803	Succeeded by Thomas Ralph Maude
Baronetage of Ireland
Preceded by Thomas Maude	Baronet (of Dundrum); 1777–1803	Succeeded by Thomas Ralph Maude
