= Mead (surname) =

Mead is a surname. Notable people with the surname include:

- Albert E. Mead (1861–1909), fifth Governor of U.S. state of Washington
- Albert R. Mead (1915–2009), American malacologist
- Andrea Mead Lawrence (1932–2009), American alpine skier and Olympic gold medalist
- Andrew Mead (born 1952), American justice
- Benjamin C. Mead (1873–1934), American lawyer
- Beth Mead (born 1995), English association footballer
- Bob Mead (born 1937), American politician
- Carver Mead (born 1934), U.S. computer scientist
- Cato Mead (c. 1761–1846), black American Revolutionary War veteran
- Charlie Mead (1921–2014), Canadian baseball player
- Chip Mead (1950–1993), American race car driver from Dayton, Ohio
- Chris Mead (1940–2003), ornithologist
- Chuck Mead, American singer, songwriter, guitarist, producer, and musical director
- Courtland Mead (born 1987), U.S. actor, best known for playing Danny Torrance in Stephen King's The Shining
- Cowles Mead (1776–1844), U.S. Representative from Georgia
- Curtis Mead (born 2000), Australian baseball player
- Cyril Mead, birth name of Syd Little (born 1942), British comedian
- Dallas Mead (born 1975), NZ rugby league footballer
- Dana G. Mead (1936–2018), American businessman and corporate director
- Daniel W. Mead (1862–1948), American engineer
- Darius Mead (1787–1864), American politician
- Darius Mead (Michigan politician) (1798–1859), American politician
- Darren Mead (born 1971), Australian rules footballer
- David Mead (musician) (born 1973), American singer-songwriter
- David Mead (rugby league) (born 1988), Papua New Guinea international rugby league footballer
- David Mead (military general) (1752–1816), American general
- Dorothy Mead (1928–1975), British painter
- Elizabeth Storrs Mead (1832–1917), American educator and President of Mount Holyoke College
- Elwood Mead (1858–1936), U.S. politician and engineer, head of the Bureau of Reclamation
- Emma Camp Mead (1866–1934), hotelkeeper and herbalist
- George Herbert Mead (1863–1931), American philosopher, sociologist
- Gertrude Mead (1867–1919), Australian doctor and advocate
- Giles W. Mead (1928–2005), American ichthyologist and museum curator
- G. R. S. Mead (1863–1933), English author, editor, and esotericist
- Hassan Mead (born 1989), Somali-born American cross country and track and field athlete
- James Mead (actor) (1912–1985), American performer; later stage name James Craig
- James R. Mead (pioneer) (1836–1910), American pioneer and politician; co-founder of Wichita
- James R. Mead (judge) (1861–1934), American jurist and politician from Connecticut
- Jane Mead (1958–2019), American poet
- Jared Mead (born 1991), American politician
- John A. Mead (1841–1920), U.S. politician from Vermont
- Jon Mead (born 1967), Canadian curler
- Larkin Goldsmith Mead (1815–1910), American sculptor
- Larry Mead (1938–2022), American politician from Missouri
- Lawrence Mead (born 1943), American political scientist
- Lee Mead (born 1981), British musical theatre actor
- Les Mead (1909–1996), Australian rugby league footballer
- Lynda Lee Mead (born 1939), 1960 winner of the Miss America pageant
- Major C. Mead (1858–1925), American politician
- Marcia Mead (1879–1967), American architect
- Margaret Mead (1901–1978), American cultural anthropologist
- Mary Mead (1935–1996), American politician
- Matt Mead (born 1962), Governor of Wyoming from 2011 to 2019
- Matthew Mead (minister) (1629–1699), English minister
- Matthew Mead (politician) (1736–1816), American politician
- Matthew Mead (poet) (1924–2009), English poet
- Maurita Murphy Mead, American musician
- Merlin Mead (1794–1874), American Underground Railroad conductor
- Michael Mead (born 1956), English ballroom dancer
- Mike Mead, American drummer
- Milt Mead (1932–2000), American track and field athlete and basketball player
- Nancy R. Mead (born 1942), American computer scientist
- Nathaniel Mead (died 1760), English lawyer and politician
- Owen Mead (1892–1942), New Zealand soldier
- Phil Mead (1887–1958), English cricketer
- Philip Mead (historian), American historian
- Richard Mead (1673–1754), English physician
- Richelle Mead (born 1976), American fantasy author
- Roger Mead (1938–2015), English statistician and professor
- Scott Mead, American fine art photographer, philanthropist, and investor
- Shepherd Mead (1914–1994), American author
- Sir Sidney Moko Mead (born 1927), New Zealand Māori anthropologist, historian, artist, teacher and writer
- Silas Mead (1834–1909), Baptist minister in Adelaide, South Australia
- Sister Janet Mead (1937–2022), Australian Catholic nun and musician
- Slade Mead (born 1961), American politician, U.S. Senator for Arizona
- Solomon Mead (1829–1905), American academic administrator
- Steven Mead (born 1962), British euphonium solo player
- Stu Mead (born 1955), American painter
- Syd Mead (1933–2019), American industrial designer, worked on films such as Blade Runner
- Taylor Mead (1924–2013), American writer and actor
- Ted Mead, Australian rugby league footballer
- Theodore Luqueer Mead (1852–1936), American naturalist
- Tim Mead (born 1981), English countertenor
- Tom Mead (1918–2004), Australian politician
- Walter Mead (cricketer) (1869–1954), English Essex cricketer
- Walter Russell Mead (born 1952), American foreign thinker
- William H. Mead (1921–1974), American bishop of the Episcopal Diocese of Delaware
- William Perrett Mead (1889–1980), New Zealand and writer
- William Richard Mead (1915–2014), British geographer
- William Rutherford Mead (1846–1928), American architect

== See also ==
- Mead (disambiguation)
- Meade (surname)
- Meads (surname)
