= James Mead =

Jim or James Mead may refer to:

== Politicians ==
- James R. Mead (pioneer) (1836–1910), American pioneer and politician; co-founder of Wichita
- James R. Mead (judge) (c.1861–1934), American jurist and politician from Connecticut
- James M. Mead (1885–1964), American politician from New York

== Performers ==
- James Mead (actor) (1912–1985), American performer; later stage name James Craig
- James Mead, American guitarist with 2001 Christian rock band Kutless

== Others ==
- James F. Mead, American scientist at UCLA in 1959; namesake of Mead acid
- James Mead, American paleontologist (James M. Adovasio#Meadowcroft Rockshelter in 1970s)
- Jim Mead, American aircraft designer (1983 Mitchell Wing P-38)
- James Mead, American colonel with 1983 Multinational Force in Lebanon#Beirut IV
- James Mead, American mixed martial artist; 2010 loss to Scott Cleve#Mixed martial arts record
- Jim Mead, American TV director at Wisconsin's UWW TV#History in 2010s

== Fictional characters ==
- Jim Mead, support in 1922 American adventure According to Hoyle (film)
- James Mead, villain in 1937 American film drama Big Town Girl

== See also ==
- James Meade (disambiguation)
- Mead (surname)
