= Senator Mead (disambiguation) =

James M. Mead (1885–1964) was a U.S. Senator from New York from 1938 to 1947. Senator Mead may also refer to:

- Benjamin P. Mead (1849–1913), Connecticut State Senate
- Cowles Mead (1776–1844), Mississippi State Senate
- Darius Mead (1787–1864), Connecticut State Senate
- James R. Mead (judge) (1860s–1934), Connecticut State Senate
- James R. Mead (pioneer) (1836–1910), Kansas State Senate
- John A. Mead (1841–1920), Vermont State Senate
- Major C. Mead (1858–1925), Wisconsin State Senate
- Slade Mead (born 1961), Arizona State Senate

== See also ==
- George L. Meade (1869–1925), New York State Senate
- Matthew J. Meade (1823–1896), Wisconsin State Senate
