= James Meade (disambiguation) =

James Meade (1907–1995) was a British economist.

Jimmy, Jim or James Meade may also refer to:

- James Meade (before 1570–after 1596), English landowner; built Narborough Hall
- James M. Meade (before 1790–1812), American captain; namesake of Meade County, Kentucky
- James Meade, President of Dominica from 1882 to 1887 (List of colonial governors and administrators of Dominica#Presidents (1872–1895))
- Jim Meade (1914–1977), American football player
- James Meade, Montserrat politician in West Indies federal elections, 1958#Senate Selection
- Jim Meade, American hijacker, D. B. Cooper's alias in 1981's The Pursuit of D. B. Cooper
- Jim Meade, Irish chief executive of Iarnród Éireann
- Jimmy Meade, American plaintiff in Obergefell v. Hodges#Bourke v. Beshear

== See also ==
- James Mead (disambiguation)
- Meade (surname)
