= Meads (disambiguation) =

Meads is a district of Eastbourne, East Sussex, England.

Meads may also refer to:

- Meads, the walled sports field of Winchester College, England
- MEADS (Medium Extended Air Defense System)
- Meads (surname)
- Meads, Kentucky, United States
- Meads Bay Pond, Anguilla
- Meads Cup, New Zealand
- Meads Peak, Antarctica

== See also ==
- Mead (disambiguation)
- Meade (disambiguation)
- Meades
- Medes (disambiguation)
