= Meades =

Meades is a surname. Notable people with the surname include:

- Anna Meades (1734 - probably before 1779), English novelist
- Christopher Meades, Vancouver novelist
- Jonathan Meades, English writer and broadcaster
- Jonathan Meades (footballer), Welsh footballer

== See also ==
- Mead (disambiguation)
- Meade (disambiguation)
- Meades Ranch Triangulation Station, a geodetic base point at or near the geographic center of the forty-eight contiguous U.S. states
- Meads (disambiguation)
- Mede (disambiguation)
- Medes (disambiguation)
