= Franklinville, New York =

- Town
- Location within New York Location within the United States
- Coordinates: 42°18′20″N 078°30′00″W
- Country: United States
- State: New York
- County: Cattaraugus

Government
  - Type: Town council
  - Supervisor: Michael Brisky (R)
  - Council: Members: • William Dallas (R); • Michael Brisky (R); • George Trummer (R); • Sharon L. Hahn (R)

Area
  - Total: 51.98 sq mi (134.64 km^{2})
  - Land: 51.81 sq mi (134.19 km^{2})
  - Water: 0.17 sq mi (0.45 km^{2})
- Elevation: 1,991 ft (607 m)

Population (2020)
  - Total: 2,811
  - Estimate (2021): 2,782
  - Density: 55.5/sq mi (21.41/km^{2})
- Time zone: UTC-5 (Eastern (EST))
  - Summer (DST): UTC-4 (EDT)
- ZIP Codes: 14737 (Franklinville); 14101 (Machias); 14731 (Ellicottville); 14741 (Great Valley); 14743 (Hinsdale)
- Area code: 716
- FIPS code: 36-009-27342
- GNIS feature ID: 978972
- Website: www.townoffranklinvilleny.gov

Franklinville is a town in Cattaraugus County, New York, United States. The population was 2,811 at the 2020 census.

Franklinville is an interior town, located in the northeast quadrant of the county. Franklinville is also the name of a village in the town.

== History ==
The town was first settled around 1806 by Joseph McCluer and known then as McCluer Settlement.

The Town of Hebe was established in 1812 from the town of Olean, at the time the only town in the county, and consisted of the entire northern half of the county. The size of Hebe (later dubbed "Ischua," not to be confused with the current town of the same name to the south) was reduced by the formation of new towns in the county: Perry (the northwest quadrant, 1814), Ellicottville, Freedom and Yorkshire (1820), and Farmersville (1821). In 1824, the town was dubbed Franklinville after the recently deceased William Temple Franklin, an agent with the Holland Land Company in his later years and the grandson of Benjamin Franklin. Lyndon was split off from Franklinville in 1829.

== Geography ==
Franklinville is located at 42°18′20″N 078°30′00″W (42.3054311, -78.4998726) and its elevation is 1,991 feet (607 m).

According to the 2010 United States census, the town has a total area of 51.985 square miles (134.64 km^{2}), of which 51.812 square miles (134.19 km^{2}) is land and 0.173 square miles (0.45 km^{2}) is water.

New York State Route 16 and New York State Route 98 are important (basically north-south) highways in the town. New York State Route 242 cuts across the northwest corner of the town.

Ischua Creek flows southward through the town, having formed the Ischua Valley.

=== Adjacent towns and areas ===
Franklinville is west of the town of Lyndon and south of the towns of Machias and Farmersville. It is north of the towns of Humphrey and Ischua and east of the town of Ellicottville.

=== Climate ===
Climate data for Franklinville, New York (1991–2020)
Month	Jan	Feb	Mar	Apr	May	Jun	Jul	Aug	Sep	Oct	Nov	Dec	Year
Mean daily maximum °F (°C)	30.7 (−0.7)	32.8 (0.4)	41.4 (5.2)	55.0 (12.8)	67.4 (19.7)	75.3 (24.1)	79.2 (26.2)	77.8 (25.4)	71.3 (21.8)	59.2 (15.1)	46.5 (8.1)	35.9 (2.2)	56.0 (13.4)
Daily mean °F (°C)	22.1 (−5.5)	23.1 (−4.9)	30.8 (−0.7)	43.3 (6.3)	54.9 (12.7)	63.7 (17.6)	67.7 (19.8)	66.3 (19.1)	59.7 (15.4)	48.6 (9.2)	37.8 (3.2)	28.5 (−1.9)	45.5 (7.5)
Mean daily minimum °F (°C)	13.5 (−10.3)	13.3 (−10.4)	20.3 (−6.5)	31.7 (−0.2)	42.5 (5.8)	52.0 (11.1)	56.1 (13.4)	54.8 (12.7)	48.1 (8.9)	37.9 (3.3)	29.1 (−1.6)	21.2 (−6.0)	35.0 (1.7)
Average precipitation inches (mm)	3.33 (85)	2.49 (63)	2.98 (76)	3.46 (88)	3.81 (97)	4.13 (105)	4.59 (117)	4.00 (102)	4.28 (109)	4.28 (109)	3.69 (94)	3.55 (90)	44.59 (1,135)
Average snowfall inches (cm)	29.8 (76)	21.5 (55)	17.1 (43)	3.9 (9.9)	0.0 (0.0)	0.0 (0.0)	0.0 (0.0)	0.0 (0.0)	0.0 (0.0)	0.5 (1.3)	11.9 (30)	23.9 (61)	108.6 (276.2)
Source: NOAA

== Demographics ==
Historical population
Census	Pop.	Note	%±
1820	1,453		—
1830	903		−37.9%
1840	1,293		43.2%
1850	1,706		31.9%
1860	1,819		6.6%
1870	1,559		−14.3%
1880	1,982		27.1%
1890	2,224		12.2%
1900	2,514		13.0%
1910	2,663		5.9%
1920	3,003		12.8%
1930	2,963		−1.3%
1940	2,762		−6.8%
1950	3,055		10.6%
1960	3,090		1.1%
1970	2,847		−7.9%
1980	3,102		9.0%
1990	2,968		−4.3%
2000	3,128		5.4%
2010	2,990		−4.4%
2020	2,811		−6.0%
2021 (est.)	2,782	▼	−1.0%
U.S. Decennial Census

As of the census of 2000, there were 3,128 people, 1,205 households, and 848 families residing in the town. The population density was 60.4 inhabitants per square mile (23.3/km^{2}). There were 1,569 housing units at an average density of 30.3 per square mile (11.7/km^{2}). The racial makeup of the town was 98.43% White, 0.10% Black or African American, 0.51% Native American, 0.22% Asian, 0.03% from other races, and 0.70% from two or more races. Hispanic or Latino of any race were 0.48% of the population.

There were 1,205 households, out of which 34.7% had children under the age of 18 living with them, 52.9% were married couples living together, 12.6% had a female householder with no husband present, and 29.6% were non-families. 24.2% of all households were made up of individuals, and 12.4% had someone living alone who was 65 years of age or older. The average household size was 2.58 and the average family size was 3.04.

In the town, the population was spread out, with 28.5% under the age of 18, 7.3% from 18 to 24, 26.3% from 25 to 44, 23.4% from 45 to 64, and 14.5% who were 65 years of age or older. The median age was 37 years. For every 100 females, there were 94.6 males. For every 100 females age 18 and over, there were 91.1 males.

The median income for a household in the town was $31,992, and the median income for a family was $37,250. Males had a median income of $28,684 versus $21,618 for females. The per capita income for the town was $14,035. About 9.8% of families and 13.6% of the population were below the poverty line, including 18.9% of those under age 18 and 6.8% of those age 65 or over.

Franklinville has had an unusually stable population compared to other towns in the area; it has consistently hovered around approximately 3,000 residents since 1920.

== Communities and locations in the Town of Franklinville ==
- Cadiz – A hamlet south of Franklinville village on NY Route 16 by its junction with County Road 69. Cadiz was once the center of commerce for the area. The Ischua Creek hosted the mill and the post office in a house now owned by Brian Edmister. The original mill stones can still be seen across the street at the historical society. One of the mill stones is located near the creek under a fence post.
- Devereaux – A hamlet in the northwest part of the town on NY Route 242.
- Fancy Tract – A location in the northwest part of the town.
- Fitch – A hamlet at the south town on County Road 19.
- Franklinville – The village of Franklinville is in the northeast part of the town on NY Routes 16 and 98.
- The Narrows – A hamlet west of Franklinville village on County Road 17.

== Education ==
- Ten Broeck Academy and Franklinville Central School – Established in 1867 by Peter Ten Broeck. Peter T. Ten Broeck, a native of Somerset County, New Jersey, was a successful farmer and county judge, and gave generously to the public of his funds and time. At the time of his death, he left a trust fund of $60,000 to be used for the building of an academy to provide free education (at a time when few scholars had the opportunity of continuing with their education beyond the eighth grade) for high school students in the area, said academy to be known as the Ten Broeck Free Academy. The academy later became a part of the Franklinville public school system, and the stone foundation at the present high school building in Franklinville came from the original Ten Broeck Free Academy stone structure.
- New Life Christian School – Rte. 16, Franklinville, New York
- Blount Library – Blount Library Inc. was opened formally on May 10, 1915. Colonel Henry F. Blount of Washington DC wrote a letter to George E. Spring, President of the Library Association. stating that he would give $5000 for the purchase of the Adams House and 132 feet of frontage on North Main Street. Application was also made to the Carnegie Corporation who also offered $2200 for the construction of the library. Carnegie Corporation's grant stipulated that the Town of Franklinville must contribute $660 annually to the upkeep of the library.

== Churches ==
- St. Philomena's Roman Catholic Church – 26 Plymouth Avenue, Franklinville, New York – first organized in 1873
- First Baptist Church – South Main Street, Franklinville, New York – first organized in 1825
- Presbyterian Church – 25 South Main Street, Franklinville, New York (closed in 2018)
- St. Barnabas Episcopal Mission – North Main Street, Franklinville, New York
- Free Methodist Church – South Main Street, Franklinville, New York
- Christian & Missionary Alliance – Pine & Green Street, Franklinville, New York

== Western New York Maple Festival ==
Held annually during the last weekend of April each year, the Western New York Maple Festival has occurred every year since its inception by the Franklinville JayCees in 1962. The festival attracts tens of thousands of visitors to the village annually. It showcases local area maple producers and their delicious maple syrup and maple products. The event is highlighted by a pageant, a parade, pancake breakfast, ham and leek dinner, trade show, craft fair and dozens of vendors.

== Notable people ==
- William H. Blyton, Wisconsin State Assemblyman
- Patricia McGee, former New York state senator
- Merlin Mead and other Underground Railroad people from Cadiz, Franklinville
- Kimberly Pressler, Miss New York USA 1999 and Miss USA 1999
- Myron H. Ranney, Medal of Honor recipient in the American Civil War
