= Meads (surname) =

Meads is a surname. Notable people with the surname include:

- Colin Meads (1936–2017), New Zealand rugby union footballer
- Eric Meads (1916–2006), English cricketer
- Johnny Meads (born 1961), American football player
- Lloyd Meeds (1927–2005), American politician
- Stanley Meads (born 1938), New Zealand rugby union footballer
- Tommy Meads (1900–1983), English footballer

== See also ==
- Mead (surname)
- Meade (surname)
