= Medes (disambiguation) =

The Medes were an ancient Iranian people.

Medes also may refer to:

- Grace Medes, American biochemist
- Medeš, the Slovak name for the Hungarian town of Medgyesegyháza
- Medes Islands, in the Mediterranean Sea
- Medeș River, in Romania
- MEDes, a Master of European Design

== See also ==
- Mead (disambiguation)
- Meade (disambiguation)
- Meades (disambiguation)
- Mede (disambiguation)
