= Myron H. Ranney =

American Civil War soldier

- Born: July 12, 1845/1846; Franklinville, New York
- Died: September 26/27, 1910; Olympia, Washington
- Burial place: Odd Fellows Memorial Park and Mausoleum, Tumwater, Washington
- Military career
- Allegiance: United States of America
- Branch: United States Army; Union Army
- Rank: Private
- Units: (New York (state)) Company G, 13th New York Volunteer Infantry
- Conflicts: Second Battle of Bull Run; American Civil War
- Awards: Medal of Honor

Myron H. Ranney (July 12, 1845/1846 - September 26/27, 1910) was an American soldier who fought in the American Civil War. Ranney received his country's highest award for bravery during combat, the Medal of Honor. Ranney's medal was won for his gallantry at the Second Battle of Bull Run in Virginia on August 30, 1862. He was honored with the award on March 23, 1895.

Ranney was born in Franklinville, New York, entered service in Dansville, New York, and was buried in Tumwater, Washington.

== Medal of Honor citation ==
The President of the United States of America, in the name of Congress, takes pleasure in presenting the Medal of Honor to Private Myron H. Ranney, United States Army, for extraordinary heroism on 30 August 1862, while serving with Company G, 13th New York Infantry, in action at Bull Run, Virginia. Private Ranney picked up the colors and carried them off the field after the Color Bearer had been shot down; was himself wounded.

== See also ==
- List of American Civil War Medal of Honor recipients: Q–S
