= 13th New York Infantry Regiment =

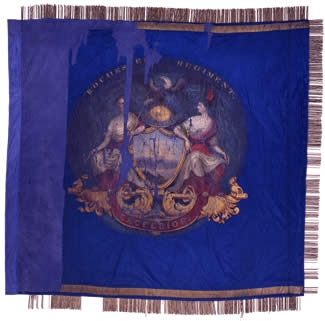
- Active: May 14, 1861 to June 23, 1863
- Country: United States
- Allegiance: Union
- Branch: Infantry
- Engagements: First Battle of Bull Run; Siege of Yorktown; Battle of Hanover Court House; Seven Days Battles; Battle of Beaver Dam Creek; Battle of Gaines's Mill; Battle of White Oak Swamp; Battle of Malvern Hill; Second Battle of Bull Run; Battle of Antietam; Battle of Fredericksburg; Battle of Chancellorsville

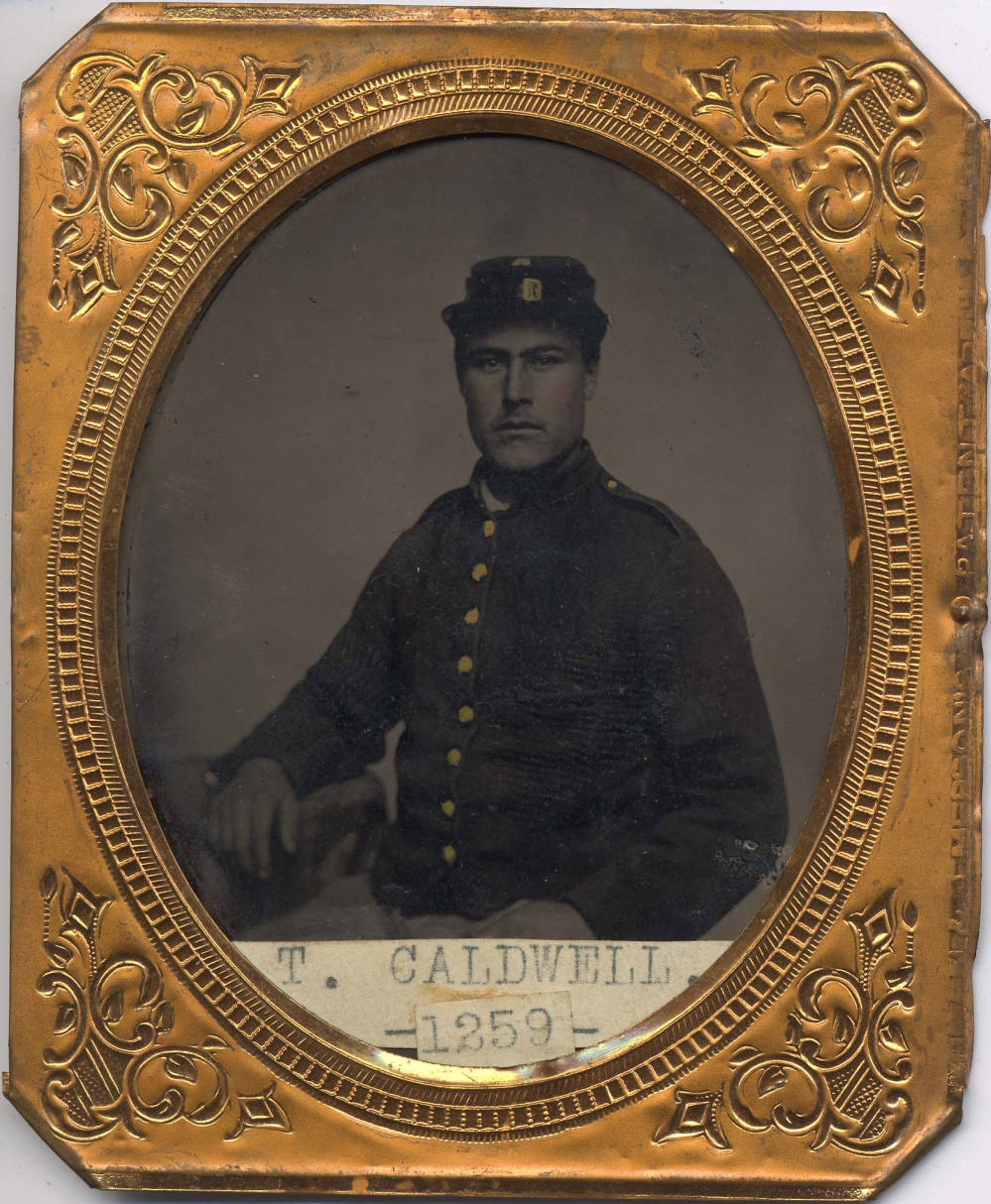
Sergeant Tzar Caldwell, 13th New York Volunteer Infantry

The 13th New York Infantry Regiment ("Rochester Regiment") was an infantry regiment in the Union Army during the American Civil War.

== Service ==
The 13th New York Infantry was organized at Elmira, New York and mustered in for two years state service on April 25, 1861. It was subsequently re-mustered for three months federal service under the command of Colonel Isaac Ferdinand Quinby. The regiment was transferred from state service to United States service for the balance of their term by order of Governor Edwin D. Morgan in August 2, 1861.

The regiment was attached to Sherman's Brigade, Tyler's Division, McDowell's Army of Northeast Virginia, from June to August 1861. For Fort Corcoran, Defenses of Washington, to October 1861. For Martindale's Brigade, Porter's Division, Army of the Potomac, to March 1862. For 1st Brigade, 1st Division, III Corps, Army of the Potomac, to May 1862. 1st Brigade, 1st Division, V Corps, to May 1863.

The 13th New York Infantry mustered out of the service on May 14, 1863. Men who had enlisted for three years' service were consolidated into two companies and served duty as Provost Guard, 1st Division, V Corps, April 27 to June 23. These two companies ceased to exist on June 23, 1863 when its members were transferred to the 140th New York Infantry.

== Detailed service ==
Left New York for Washington, D. C., May 30. Camp on Meridian Hill, defenses of Washington, until June 3, 1861, and at Fort Corcoran until July 16. Advance on Manassas, Va., July 16–21. Occupation of Fairfax Court House July 17. Blackburn's Ford July 18. First Battle of Bull Run July 21. Duty in the defenses of Washington until March 1862. Moved to the Virginia Peninsula March 16. Warwick Road April 5. Siege of Yorktown April 5-May 4. Reconnaissance from Yorktown April 11–13. New Bridge May 24. Battle of Hanover Court House May 27. Operations about Hanover Court House May 27–29. Seven Days before Richmond June 25-July 1. Mechanicsville June 26. Gaines's Mill June 27. White Oak Swamp and Turkey Bend June 30. Malvern Hill July 1. At Harrison's Landing until August 16. Retreat from the Peninsula and movement to Centreville August 16–28. Pope's Campaign in northern Virginia August 28-September 2. Second Battle of Bull Run August 30. Maryland Campaign September 6–22. Battle of Antietam September 16–17. Shepherdstown September 19. At Sharpsburg, Md., to October 30. Movement to Falmouth, Va., October 30-November 19. Battle of Fredericksburg December 12–15. Expedition to Richards' and Ellis' Fords December 29–30. "Mud March" January 20–24, 1863. At Falmouth until April 26. Chancellorsville Campaign April 27-May 6. Battle of Chancellorsville May 1–5.

== Casualties ==
The regiment lost a total of 100 men during service; 4 officers and 67 enlisted men killed or mortally wounded, 29 enlisted men died of disease.

== Commanders ==
- Colonel Isaac Ferdinand Quinby
- Colonel John Pickell
- Colonel Elisha Gaylord Marshall
- Lieutenant Colonel Francis A. Schoeffel - commanded at the Battle of Fredericksburg after Col. Marshall was wounded in action
- Captain William Downey - commanded the unit after it was consolidated to two companies

== Notable members ==
- Private Myron H. Ranney, Company G - Medal of Honor recipient for action at the First Battle of Bull Run
- Captain Henry Lomb, Company C - Industrialist, educator and philanthropist

== See also ==
- List of New York Civil War regiments
- New York in the Civil War
