= Meade =

Meade may refer to:

== Geographic placenames ==
- Meade Glacier, Washington, US
- Meade Island, Western Australia
- Meade River, Alaska, US

== Populated places or administrative divisions ==
- Meade, Kansas
- Meade, Ohio
- Meade County, Kansas
- Meade County, Kentucky
- Meade County, South Dakota
- Meade Township, Huron County, Michigan
- Meade Township, Mason County, Michigan

== Other uses ==
- Meade (surname), people with the surname Meade
- Meade Instruments, a company that manufactured telescopes and other astronomy accessories
- Meade Senior High School, a high school in Fort Meade, Maryland
- Meade Stadium, of the University of Rhode Island in Kingston, Rhode Island

== See also ==
- Mead (disambiguation)
- Meades (disambiguation)
- Meads (disambiguation)
- Mede (disambiguation)
- Medes (disambiguation)
