= Fort Corcoran =

- Part of the Civil War defenses of Washington, D.C.
- Arlington, Virginia
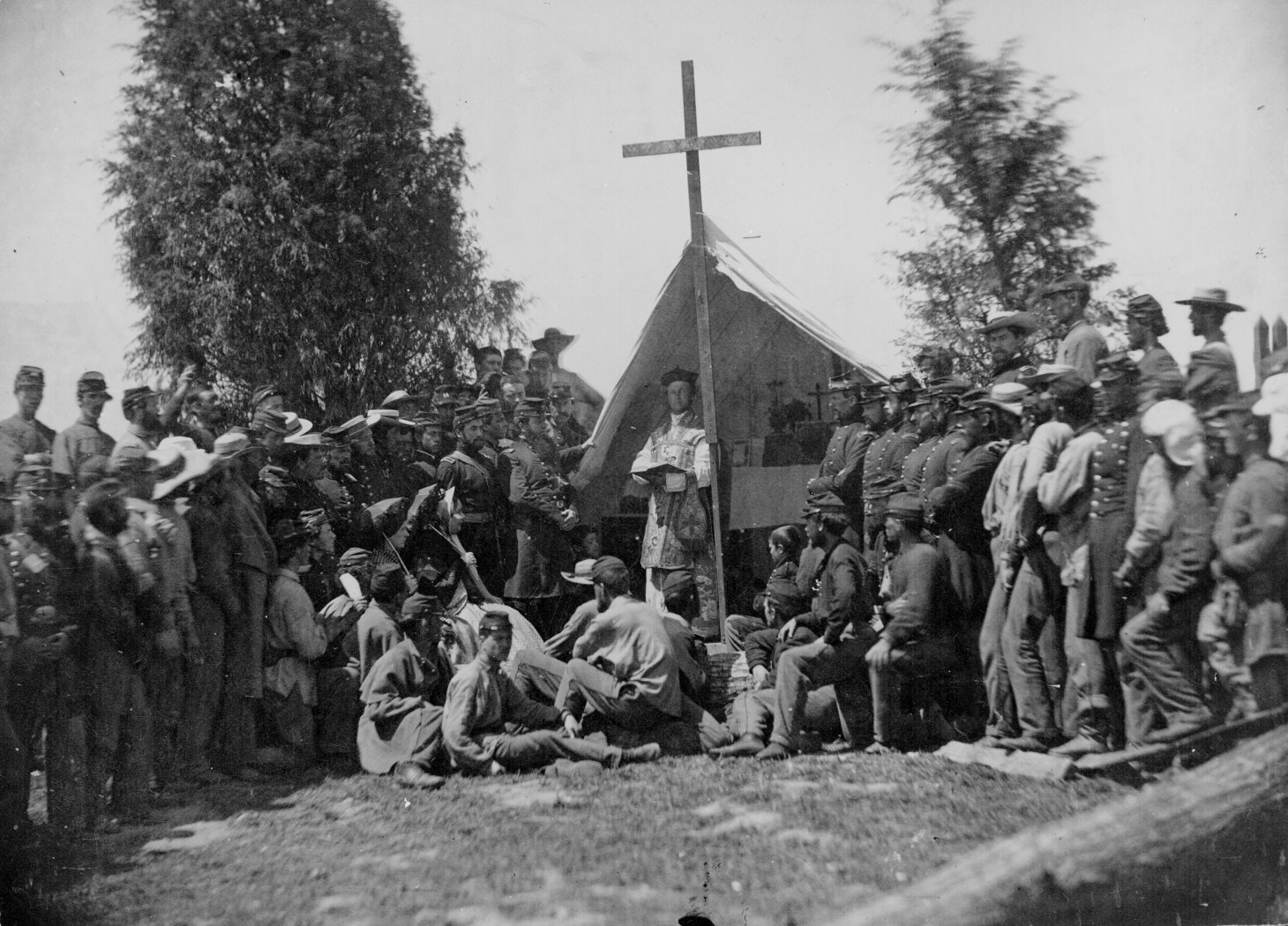
- The Fighting 69th; Irish Brigade, New York Volunteer Regiment, United States attend church services at Fort Corcoran in 1861.

Location
- Coordinates: 38°53′46.4″N 77°04′35.7″W

Fort Corcoran was a wood-and-earthwork fortification constructed by the Union Army in northern Virginia as part of the defenses of Washington, D.C. during the American Civil War. Built in 1861, shortly after the occupation of Arlington, Virginia by Union forces, it protected the southern end of the Aqueduct Bridge and overlooked the Potomac River and Theodore Roosevelt Island, known as Mason's Island.

The fort was named after Colonel Michael Corcoran, commander of the U.S. Fighting 69th Infantry, Irish Brigade 69th New York Volunteer Regiment, one of the units that constructed the fort. Fort Corcoran was home to the Union Army Balloon Corps and the headquarters of the defenses of Washington south of the Potomac River, and served throughout the war before being dismantled in 1866. Today, no trace of the fort remains, although the Arlington County government has erected a historical marker at its site.

== Early history of the Civil War in Northern Virginia ==
Before the outbreak of the Civil War, Alexandria County (renamed Arlington County in 1920), the closest Virginia county to Washington, D.C., was a predominantly rural area. Originally part of the District of Columbia, the land now comprising the county was retroceded to Virginia in a July 9, 1846 act of Congress that took effect in 1847. Most of the county is hilly, and at the time, most of the county's population was concentrated in the town of Alexandria at the southeastern corner of the county. In 1861, the rest of the county largely consisted of scattered farms and plantations (including the Abingdon Plantation), the occasional house, fields for grazing livestock, and Arlington House, owned by Mary Custis, wife of Robert E. Lee.

Following the surrender of Fort Sumter in Charleston, South Carolina, on April 14, 1861, the new American president Abraham Lincoln declared that "an insurrection existed" and called for 75,000 troops to be called up to quash the rebellion. The move sparked resentment in many other southern states, which promptly moved to convene discussions of secession. The Virginia State Convention passed "an ordinance of secession" and ordered a May 23 referendum to decide whether or not the state should secede from the Union. The U.S. Army responded by creating the Department of Washington, which united all Union troops in the District of Columbia and Maryland under one command.

Brigadier General J.F.K. Mansfield, commander of the Department of Washington, argued that Northern Virginia should be occupied as soon as possible in order to prevent the possibility of the Confederate Army mounting artillery on the hills of Arlington and shelling government buildings in Washington. He also urged the erection of fortifications on the Virginia side of the Potomac River to protect the southern terminuses of the Chain Bridge, Long Bridge, and the Aqueduct Bridge. His superiors approved these recommendations, but decided to wait until after Virginia voted for or against secession.

On May 23, 1861, Virginia voted by a margin of 3 to 1 in favor of leaving the Union. That night, U.S. Army troops began crossing the bridges which link Washington, D.C. to Virginia. The march, which began at 10 p.m. on the night of the 23rd, was described in colorful terms by the New York Herald two days later:

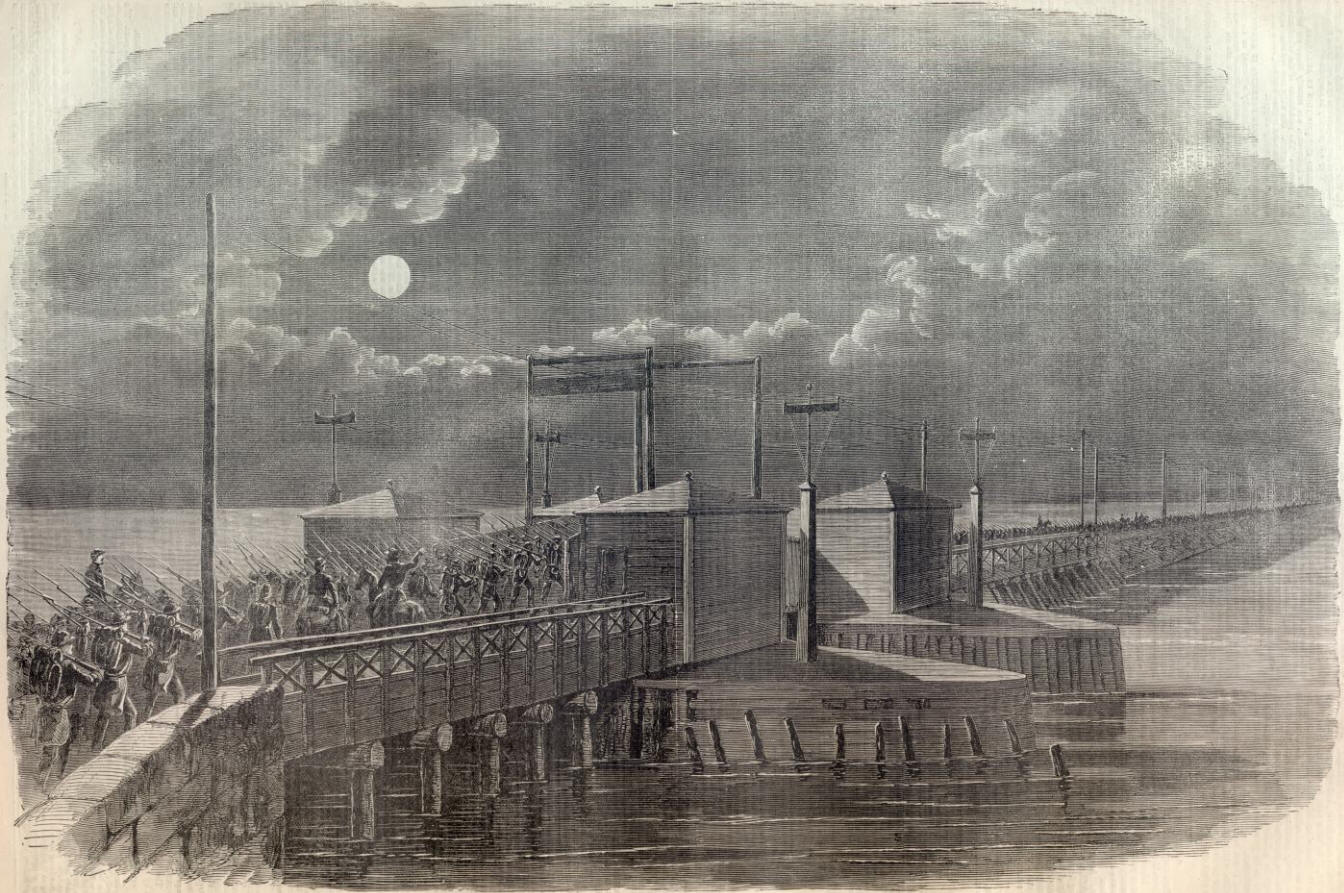
Union soldiers cross the Long Bridge during the occupation of Northern Virginia following that state's secession from the Union.

There can be no more complaints of inactivity of the government. The forward march movement into Virginia, indicated in my despatches last night, took place at the precise time this morning that I named, but in much more imposing and powerful numbers.

About ten o'clock last night four companies of picked men moved over the Long Bridge, as an advance guard. They were sent to reconnoitre, and if assailed were ordered to signal, when they would have been reinforced by a corps of regular infantry and a battery....

At twelve o'clock the infantry regiment, artillery and cavalry corps began to muster and assume marching order. As fast as the several regiments were ready they proceeded to the Long Bridge, those in Washington being directed to take that route.

The troops quartered at Georgetown, the Sixty-ninth, Fifth, Eighth and Twenty-eighth New York regiments, proceeded across what is known as the chain bridge, above the mouth of the Potomac Aqueduct, under the command of General McDowell. They took possession of the heights in that direction.

The imposing scene was at the Long Bridge, where the main body of the troops crossed. Eight thousand infantry, two regular cavalry companies and two sections of Sherman's artillery battalion consisting of two batteries, were in line this side of the Long Bridge at two o'clock.

For the most part, the occupation of Northern Virginia was peaceful. The town of Alexandria was the sole exception. There, as Colonel Elmer E. Ellsworth, commander of the New York Fire Zouaves (Eleventh New York Volunteer Infantry Regiment), entered a local hotel to remove the Confederate flag flying above it, he was shot and killed by James Jackson, the proprietor. Ellsworth was one of the first men killed in the American Civil War.

== Planning and construction ==
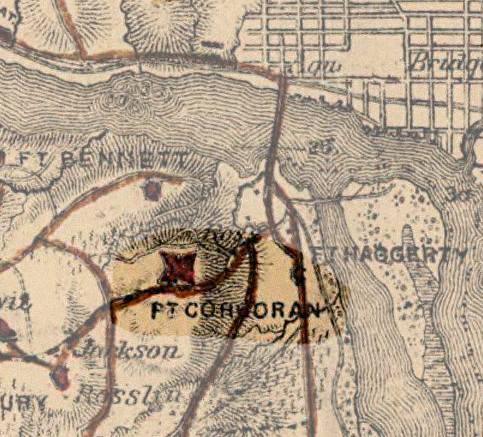
Portion of an 1865 map showing the location of Fort Corcoran. To the northeast is the Potomac River and Georgetown. The Aqueduct Bridge can also be distinguished.

Over 13,000 men marched into Northern Virginia on the 24th, bringing with them "a long train of wagons filled with wheelbarrows, shovels, &c." These implements were put to work even as thousands of men marched further into Virginia. Engineer officers under the command of then-Colonel John G. Barnard accompanied the army and began building fortifications and entrenchments along the banks of the Potomac River in order to defend the bridges that crossed it. By sunrise on the morning of the 24th, ground had already been broken on the first two forts comprising the Civil War defenses of Washington — Fort Runyon and Fort Corcoran. Fort Corcoran was named after Colonel Michael Corcoran, commander of the 69th New York Volunteer Regiment, one of the units that constructed the fort. The 69th New York, part of the famed Irish Brigade, went about its work with high spirits, exemplified by the actions of Father Thomas Mooney, the 69th's chaplain. After the fort's cannon were emplaced, Mooney baptized them and was promptly recalled by New York's bishop, who took a dim view of the sacrilegious action.

Despite the limited nature of the two forts, Barnard reported that the work was difficult. "The first operations of field engineering were, necessarily, the securing of our debouches to the other shore and establishing of a strong point to strengthen our hold of Alexandria. The works required for these limited objects (though being really little towards constructing a defensive line) were nevertheless, considering the small number of troops available, arduous undertakings."

In the seven weeks that followed the occupation of Arlington and the beginning of work on Fort Corcoran, Barnard and his engineers were forced to focus virtually all of their effort on Corcoran and Runyon, owing to the limited resources available. By the time Barnard was beginning to focus his efforts on tying Corcoran and Runyon into an entire belt of fortifications, his engineers were drawn off by the approach of the Confederate Army and the incipient First Battle of Bull Run.

=== Expansion and renovation ===
Following the Union defeat at Bull Run, panicked efforts were made to strengthen the forts built by Barnard in order to defend Washington from what was perceived as an imminent Confederate attack. Many of makeshift trenches and blockhouses that resulted would later be renovated and expanded into permanent defenses surrounding Fort Corcoran. On July 23, President Abraham Lincoln and Secretary of State William Seward visited Fort Corcoran in an effort to revive morale after the defeat at Bull Run.

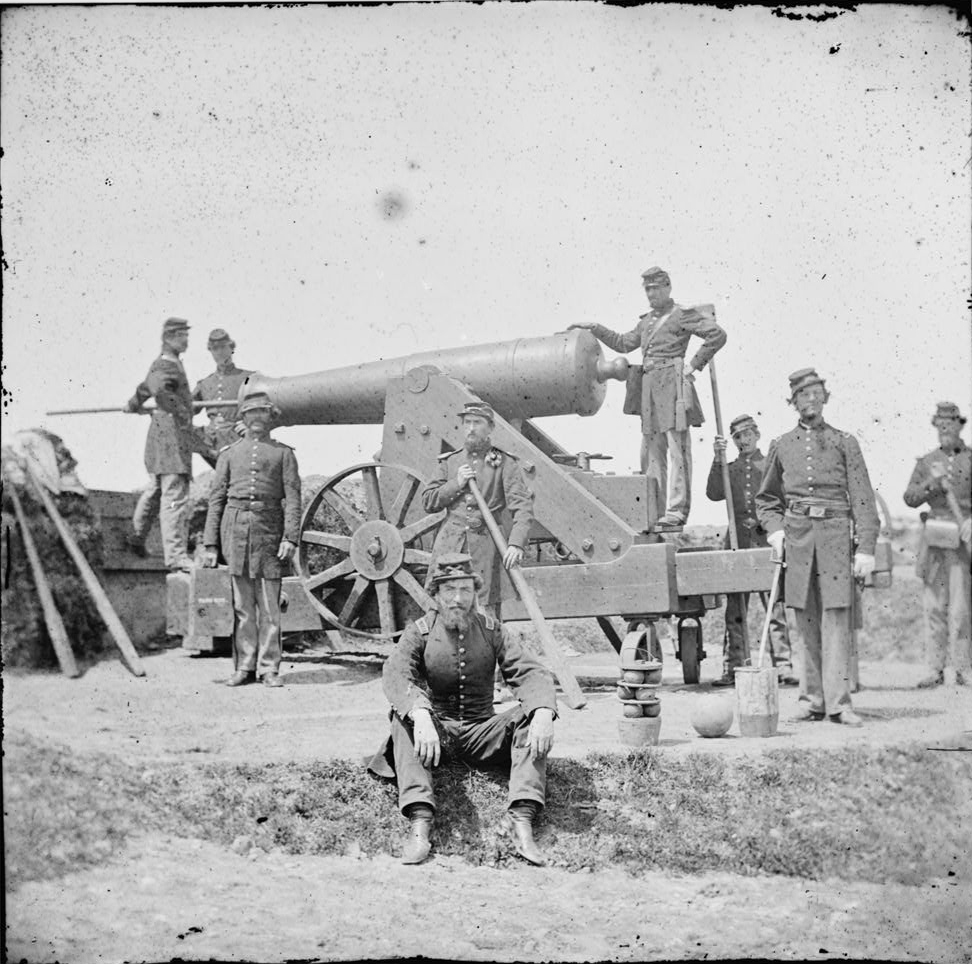
Artillerymen pose with their 24-pounder siege cannon at Fort Corcoran

On July 26, 1861, five days after Bull Run, Maj. Gen. George B. McClellan was named commander of the military district of Washington and the Army of the Potomac. Upon arriving in Washington, McClellan was appalled by the condition of the city's defenses, despite the hurried efforts in the wake of the Union defeat:

In no quarter were the dispositions for defense such as to offer a vigorous resistance to a respectable body of the enemy, either in the position and numbers of the troops or the number and character of the defensive works... not a single defensive work had been commenced on the Maryland side. There was nothing to prevent the enemy shelling the city from heights within easy range, which could be occupied by a hostile column almost without resistance.

Large numbers of disorganized troops sat in hastily dug trenches in Arlington, awaiting a Confederate assault. Fort Corcoran itself served as the rallying point for several battered artillery units, filling the fort well beyond capacity. An informal report on July 29, 1861, indicated Corcoran had far more than its planned 12 guns and 180 artillerymen. The report listed "12 8-inch seacoast howitzers, seven 24-pounder barbette guns, two 12-pounder field guns, and two 24-pounder howitzers." Manning these guns were over 200 dedicated artillerymen and many soldiers from the De Kalb regiment who had been cross-trained in artillery. Naturally, these facts meant the fort was severely overcrowded, and the report indicated that "...the field batteries are in very unsatisfactory condition, many of them..."

To remedy the situation at Corcoran and the other forts defending Washington, one of McClellan's first orders upon taking command was to greatly expand the number and size of the forts defending the city. In regards to improving Fort Corcoran, Barnard reported, "A belt of woods was felled through the forest in front of Arlington and half-sunk batteries prepared along the ridge in front of Fort Corcoran and at suitable points near Fort Albany, and a battery of two rifled 42-pounders (Battery Cameron) was established on the heights near the distributing reservoir above Georgetown to sweep the approaches to Fort Corcoran." Portions of this work were done by troops under the command of William Tecumseh Sherman, eventual commander of the Military Division of the Mississippi, who was encamped in a location near the fort following the defeat at Bull Run.

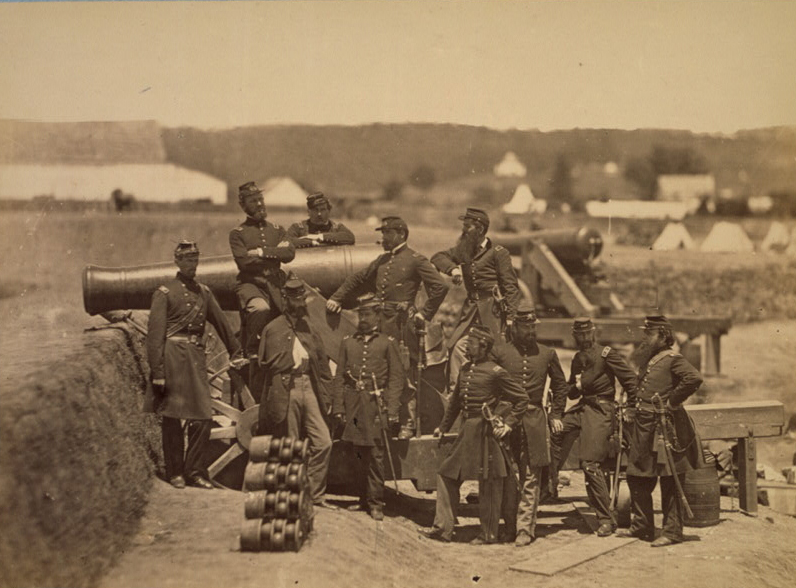
Officers of the 69th New York Volunteer Regiment pose with a cannon at Fort Corcoran in 1861.Michael Corcoran at left

On October 25, 1862, Edwin M. Stanton, the Secretary of War, ordered that a civilian commission be established in order to study the defenses of Washington, D.C. and make recommendations on improving those defenses as needed. The final report was delivered to Secretary Stanton on December 30, 1862, and several portions dealt with Fort Corcoran, one of the largest forts defending Washington at the time. The commission recommended that a new work be constructed on a ridge above and behind Forts Tillinghast and Cass in order to "...give great additional strength to Fort Corcoran, enabling it to be held, even should the two works in its front fall...." In addition, the commission recommended that additional bombproofs be constructed in Fort Corcoran in order to provide protected refuge for the entire garrison.

In the years that followed the completion of the fort, numerous telegraph lines were laid between Fort Corcoran, War Department offices in Washington, and other forts in Northern Virginia. According to a July 1863 report on the operations of the military telegraphs in the Army of the Potomac, six telegraph lines ran between Fort Corcoran and Washington, five between Corcoran and Fort Ethan Allen, two between Corcoran and Alexandria, and one each to two observation points southwest of the fort. Throughout the remainder of the war, Fort Corcoran remained an important communications center for the entire Arlington Line system of defenses, eventually connecting to over 30 miles of telegraph wire at the time of Robert E. Lee's surrender.

== Wartime use ==
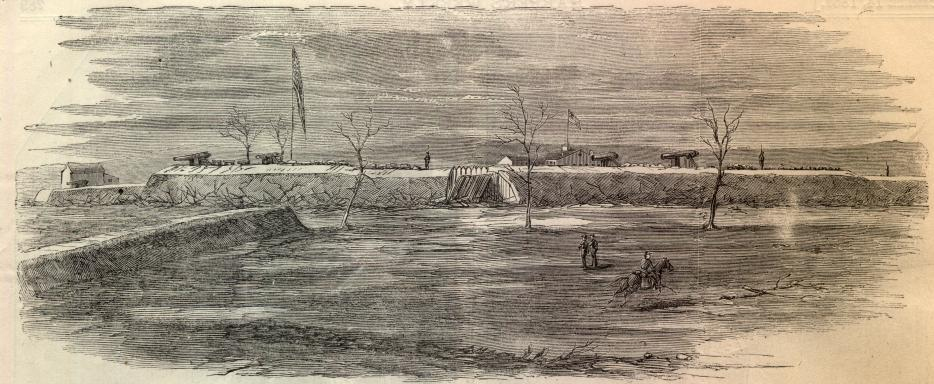
A sketch of Fort Corcoran, as published in Harper's Weekly in December 1861. The view is of the southern wall of the fort.

As originally designed, Fort Corcoran's planned 12-gun complement would have been manned by 180 artillerymen, and the fort's 576 yards of perimeter would have been guarded by 620 soldiers, for a total garrison of 800 men. The initial garrison was the 13th New York Volunteer Infantry, and the fort's 12 guns were manned by Company K of the 2nd Wisconsin Volunteer Infantry Regiment. However, the demands of war meant that the 2nd Wisconsin Regiment was needed for the Peninsula Campaign and left Fort Corcoran in late 1861. Throughout the war, Fort Corcoran's rear location and proximity to the supply depots of Washington meant that a steady stream of Union regiments rotated through the fort and the military camps nearby for much of the war. In August 1861 alone, regiments from Maine, Massachusetts, New York, Michigan, Rhode Island, Wisconsin, and Pennsylvania served in or near the fort. So many troops were stationed in and near the fort, in fact, that in a report on March 31, 1863, General Barnard, chief engineer of the defenses of Washington, said Fort Corcoran was among a small number of sites that had "more enlisted men than required as artillery garrisons."

On May 17, 1864, Brigadier General A. P. Howe, Inspector-General of Artillery for the Union Army, concluded an inspection of the garrisons of the various forts defending Washington, D.C. At Fort Corcoran, an "interior work," he found little to commend, except the size of the garrison, which consisted of three companies of the 2nd New York Heavy Artillery. The men he found to be "very ordinary" in artillery drill, "very deficient" in infantry drill, and "a low state" of discipline overall. These problems, he concluded, were the fault of the commanding officer, Lieutenant Colonel Palmer, who "shows inefficiency in the command." General Howe also counted three magazines and 11 guns (one less than the 1861 plan) of various types at the fort: two 8-inch seacoast howitzers, two 12-pounder heavy guns, four 12-pounder light Napoleons, and three 10-pounder Parrott rifles.

=== Communications and headquarters ===
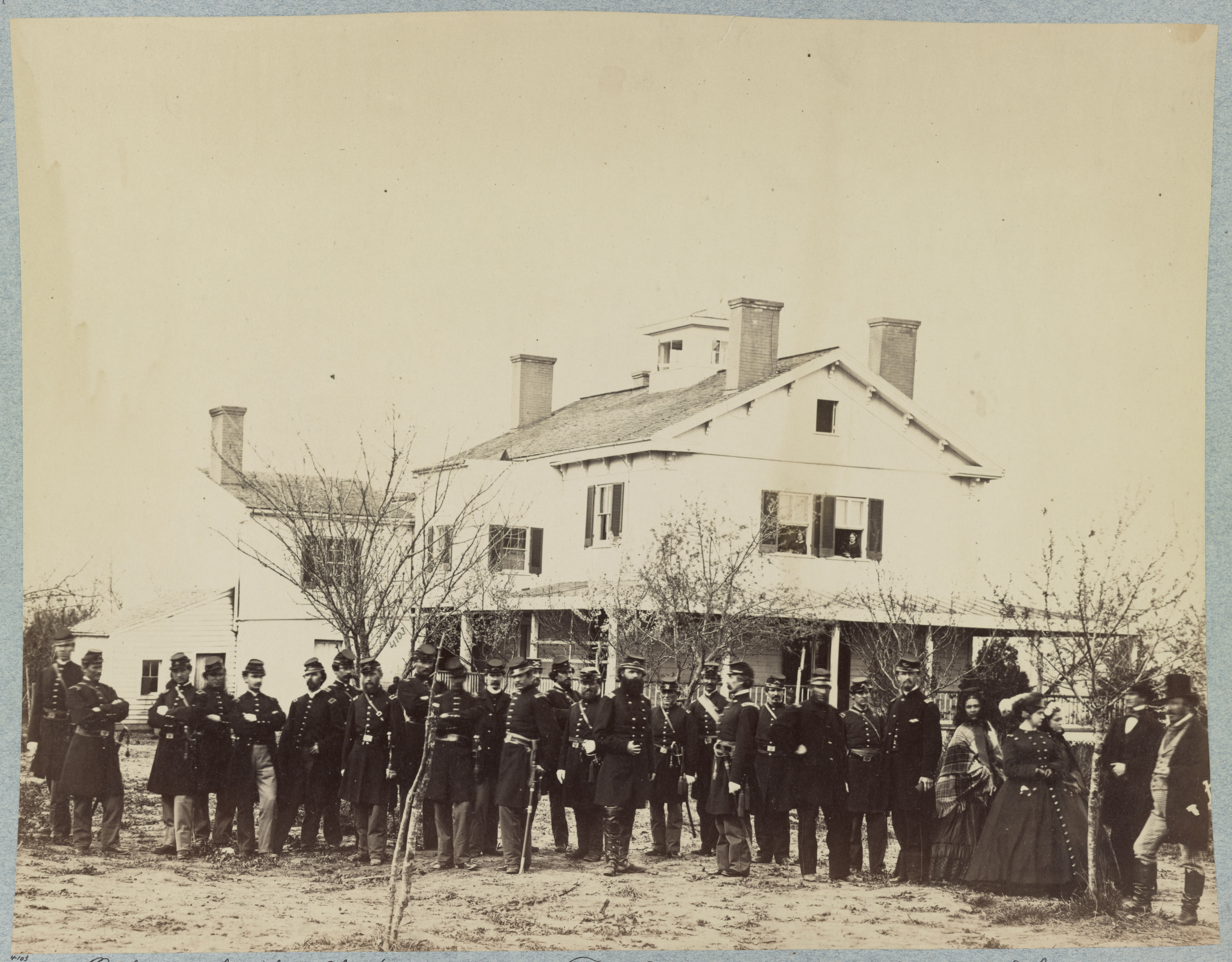
Officers of 4th N.Y. Heavy Artiller at Fort Corcoran in 1862

Due to the number of camps that surrounded it, its secure rearward location, and multiple telegraph connections with Washington, Alexandria, and other forts defending Washington, Fort Corcoran became the headquarters for Washington's defenses south of the Potomac River. On September 6, 1862, General Fitz John Porter assumed command of those defenses and made his headquarters at Fort Corcoran. He was only at Fort Corcoran for a short time before he and the rest of his command were withdrawn from the defenses of Washington in order to counter Lee's advance into Maryland. A bare handful of artillerymen were left to man the guns of the forts along the Arlington Line. Following the climactic Battle of Antietam, Porter and his men returned to Fort Corcoran. A few months following Antietam, Porter was court-martialed for his actions at the Second Battle of Bull Run and was removed from command.

Replacing Porter was Brigadier General Gustavus Adolphus DeRussy, whose division was spread across multiple forts in the Arlington Line defenses. As did Porter before him, DeRussy made his headquarters at Fort Corcoran and directed the defense of the Arlington Line until after the final surrender of Confederate forces.

=== Union Army Balloon Corps ===
The two generals' divisions were not the only units to have their headquarters at Fort Corcoran, however. From September 1861 through August 1863, Fort Corcoran served as the official headquarters for the Union Army Balloon Corps, a civilian organization commanded by Thaddeus S. C. Lowe, who had been appointed to the position by President Lincoln. The Balloon Corps performed limited aerial observation duties for the Army of the Potomac.

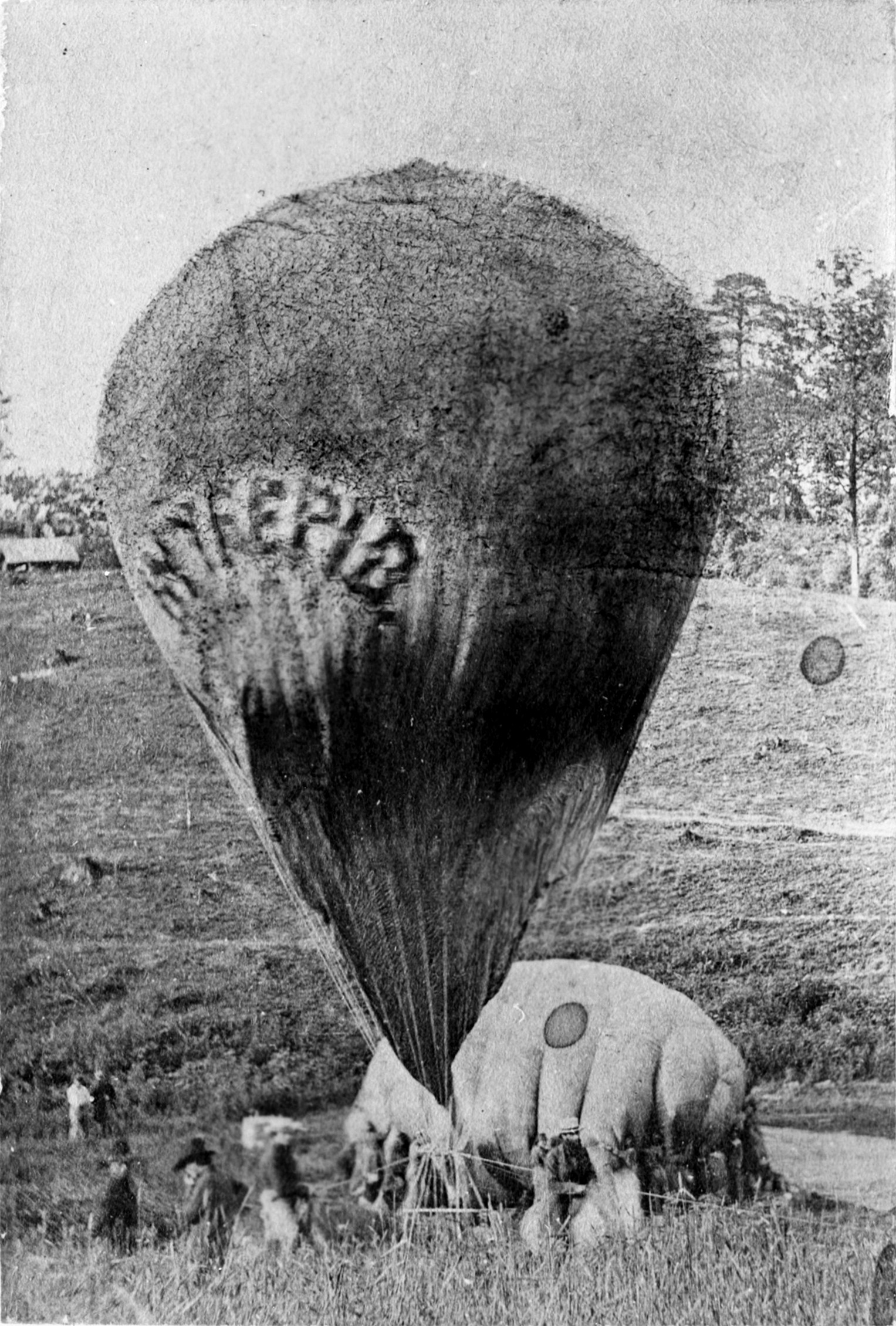
The balloon Intrepid, one of six to eventually be constructed by Thaddeus Lowe and the Union Army Balloon Corps.

In late July 1861, Lowe inflated a balloon in Washington with hopes of providing aerial coverage for the impending Battle of Bull Run, but a violent storm buffeted the inflated balloon and delayed Lowe until word of the Union defeat reached him on the road. Lowe subsequently decided to make a detour to Fort Corcoran, reaching it on July 27. Over the next few days, he repeatedly ascended in the balloon to make maps of the surrounding area and gather intelligence about Confederate troops advancing on Washington.

The information gathered was valuable enough that Lowe was ordered to construct larger balloons by an officer of the U.S. Army's Topographic Engineering Corps. The first of these was complete by mid-August, and was subsequently ordered to report to Fort Corcoran. Beginning August 30, 1861, Lowe's new balloon made daily ascents to monitor the movements of Confederate troops that had moved north following the Battle of Bull Run. By September 11, 1861, General F.J. Porter, in command of the forces in the area of Fort Corcoran was impressed enough by Lowe's daily reports to write, "You are of value now."

On September 24, 1861, Lowe went beyond simple observations when he actively directed the fall of artillery fire from nearby Camp Advance on Confederate positions near Falls Church, three miles away. The agreed-upon signaling system was simple, but effective: "If we fire to the right of Falls Church, let a white flag be raised in the balloon; if to the left, let it be lowered; if over, let it be shown stationary; if under, let it be waved occasionally." This event was the first time in American history that an aerial observer actively directed artillery fire.

Because of these and other successes, Lowe was authorized to build four additional balloons and the needed inflation equipment. However, Lowe's initial successes proved difficult to recreate in field conditions, and aside from limited successes, such as at the Battle of Seven Pines, the utility of the Balloon Corps was limited. In addition, jurisdictional squabbles arose between Lowe's civilian command and the military officers under whom he worked. By early 1863, Lowe had grown tired of dealing with military minutia and left the Corps, returning to civilian research. The Balloon Corps fell to the command of less-capable individuals and was eventually eliminated in August 1863.

=== Camp life ===
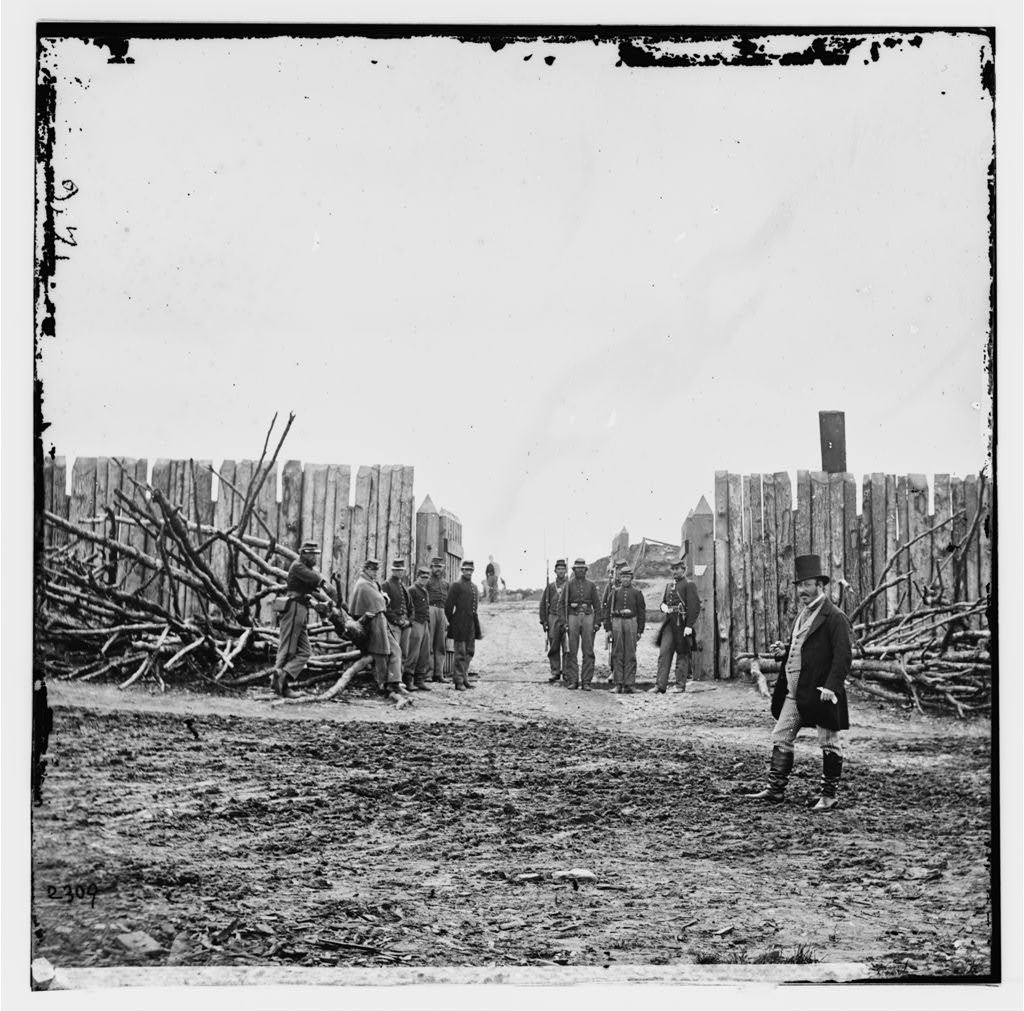
The rear entrance to Fort Corcoran. The timber palisade and wooden barriers are easily visible, as is a portion of the garrison.

Due to Fort Corcoran's large size and proximity to Georgetown, duty as part of the fort's garrison was less of a hardship than it was at many of the more isolated forts in the defenses of Washington, such as Fort Greble. Morale and sanitation officers often visited Fort Corcoran, and leave to visit Georgetown or Washington was sometimes granted to both officers and enlisted men. Men at the fort served in regimental bands or played baseball in their spare time between periods of infantry and gunnery drill. Due to Fort Corcoran's location behind the Arlington Line, however, drill was not as intense as at many front-line forts.

Much of the work at the fort dealt with maintenance and renovation of the original structure, which had been hurriedly thrown up in the wake of the Union advance into Arlington after the secession of Virginia. An 1864 report by Brigadier General Richard Delafield, chief of the U.S. Army Corps of Engineers lists an extensive series of improvements made to the fort over the previous year. This work was typically done by the soldiers of the garrison, who supplied much of the labor for all of the defenses protecting Washington. At Fort Corcoran, Delafield reported, "one magazine has been rebuilt and the other two reinforced; a new bomb-proof 158 feet long has been built; interior revetment repaired; embrasures newly revetted, and seven new platforms and embrasures made." At Fort Corcoran, however, some of the work was done by contracted laborers or freed slaves, thus freeing much of the garrison for leisure time.

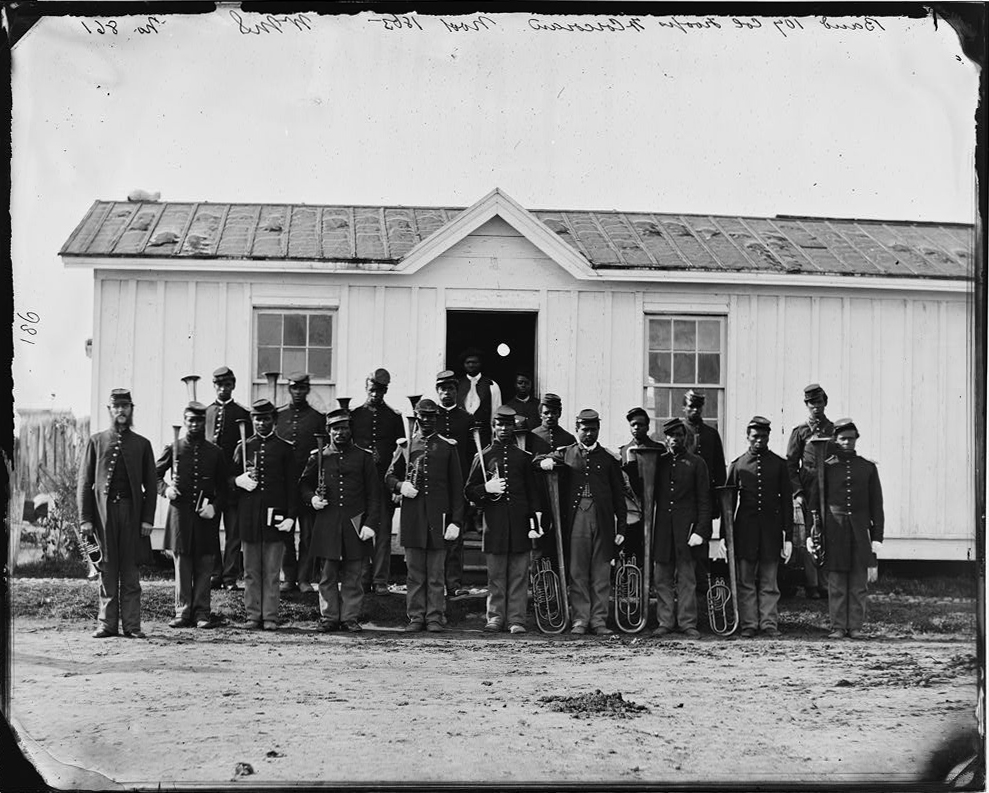
The band of the 107th Colored Infantry Regiment, which was stationed at Fort Corcoran in late 1865.

Duty was not entirely idyllic, however. Due to the fort's proximity to Georgetown, clashes between soldiers on leave and civilians were inevitable. On March 7, 1866, Edward N. Lucas, a local resident, complained that "he was assaulted and badly beaten by colored soldiers from Fort Corcoran at the Aqueduct Bridge yesterday."

=== Early's Raid and beyond ===
During Early's Raid, which preceded the Battle of Fort Stevens, troops were rushed to Fort Corcoran in order to help forestall a Confederate advance on the Arlington Line. After it became apparent that the forces under the command of Confederate general Jubal Early were moving further north, the additional troops at Fort Corcoran marched northward to counter them.

In August 1864, the 10th New York Heavy Artillery Regiment manned the defenses of Fort Corcoran.

On April 18, 1865, the garrison at Fort Corcoran participated in a national salute to President Lincoln, who had been assassinated four days prior. At sunset, all ten guns at Fort Corcoran fired in unison with the guns of Fort Lincoln, Alexandria, and Camp Barry.

== Post-war use ==
After the surrender of General Robert E. Lee's Army of Northern Virginia on April 9, 1865, the primary reason for manned defenses protecting Washington ceased to exist. Initial recommendations by Col. Alexander, chief engineer of the Washington defenses, were to divide the defenses into three classes: those that should be kept active (first-class), those that should be mothballed and kept in a reserve state (second-class), and those that should be abandoned entirely (third-class). Fort Corcoran fell into the third-class category.

In order to speed the dismantling of the third-class forts, the 22nd Army Corps issued General Order 89, which stated (in part) that the guns and ammunition removed from the dismantled forts should be kept in storage. Fort Corcoran was chosen as one of the storage locations and thus avoided the immediate demise of the other third-class fortifications. By the end of August 1865, however, with funds running low, and no further appropriations likely, more and more forts were designated as second- or third-class locations, and were dismantled and the land returned to its original owners Fort Corcoran stored the cannon of the dismantled forts located south of the Potomac River.

By October 1866, orders were given to the Ordnance Sergeant at Fort Corcoran to compile a complete list of all the weapons at the fort in order to assist in their final movement to the Washington Arsenal or other permanent forts. Shortly afterward, the fort was dismantled and the land returned to its original owner, the Ross Family.

Today, the site of the fort is located at the intersection of Key Boulevard and North Ode Street in Arlington, Virginia (1530 N. Key Blvd., on the site of the Atrium). No trace of the fort remains, although the Arlington Historical Society has erected a historical marker at its approximate site in urban Arlington.

== Bibliography ==
- Feng, Patrick (2017). "Fort Corcoran, Virginia". On Point. 23 (1): 46–49. JSTOR 26295933.
