= Meade (surname) =

Meade is a surname, and may refer to:

== Actors ==
- Ada Meade (1883–1965), American actress
- Emily Meade (born 1989), American actress
- Garth Meade (1925–2002), South African comedian/actor, active in Australia since 1970
- Mary Meade (1923–2003), American film actress of the 1940s

== Artists and musicians ==
- Alexa Meade (born 1986), American artist
- Angela Meade (born 1977), American opera singer
- Tyson Meade (born 1962), singer and songwriter

== Military ==
- Arthur Meade, 5th Earl of Clanwilliam (1873–1953), British army officer and politician
- George Meade (1815–1872), American Civil War general
- Richard Meade, 4th Earl of Clanwilliam (1832–1907), British Royal Navy officer
- Richard John Meade (1821–1894), British Indian army general
- Richard Worsam Meade I (1778–1828), American merchant and art collector
- Richard Worsam Meade II (1807–1870), American naval officer
- Richard Worsam Meade III (1837–1897), American naval officer
- Robert Leamy Meade (1842–1910), officer in the United States Marine Corps

== Politicians and ambassadors ==
- Arthur Meade, 5th Earl of Clanwilliam (1873–1953), British army officer and politician
- Edwin R. Meade (1836–1889), lawyer and U.S. Congressman
- Hugh Meade (1907–1949), U.S. Congressman
- Sir John Meade, 1st Baronet (1642–1707), Irish barrister, judge and politician, Member of the Parliament of Ireland 1689–1707
- John Meade, 1st Earl of Clanwilliam (1744–1800), Irish peer and Member of the Parliament of Ireland for Banagher 1764–67
- John Meade (British Army officer) (c. 1775–1849), Member of the UK Parliament for County Down 1805–12
- José Antonio Meade (born 1969), Mexican politician and economist, PRI candidate for the 2018 Mexican general election
- Matthew J. Meade (1823–1896), Wisconsin state senator
- Reuben Meade (born 1952), politician from Montserrat
- Richard Meade, 3rd Earl of Clanwilliam (1795–1879), British ambassador
- Richard Kidder Meade (1803–1862), lawyer and U.S. Congressman from Virginia
- Robert Henry Meade (1835–1898), Head of the British Colonial Office
- Wendell H. Meade (1912–1986), lawyer and U.S. Congressman in Kentucky

== Religion ==
- Charles Meade (1916-2010), Christian group leader
- Marie Meade (born 1947), Yup'ik tradition bearer
- William Meade (1789–1862), United States Episcopal bishop

== Sport ==
- Charles Francis Meade (1881–1975), British mountaineer and author
- Corrin Brooks-Meade (1988–2025), English-born Montserratian footballer
- James "Jim" Gordon Meade (1914–1977), American football player
- McPherson Meade (born 1979), Montserratian cricketer
- Neville Meade (1948–2010), British boxer
- Noel Meade, Irish trainer of racehorses
- Raphael Meade (born 1962), English football (soccer) player
- Richard Meade (equestrian) (1938–2015), British equestrian and Olympic gold medal winner
- Richie Meade, American lacrosse coach
- Seán Meade (born 1937), Gaelic footballer

== Writers ==
- Charles Francis Meade (1881–1975), British mountaineer and author
- Gerald Willoughby-Meade (1875–1958), British author who wrote about the supernatural in Chinese folklore
- Glenn Meade (born 1957), Irish author
- L. T. Meade (1854–1914), pseudonym of Elizabeth Thomasina Meade Smith, an English writer of girls' stories
- Marion Meade (1934–2022), American biographer

== Other ==
- Carl J. Meade (born 1950), NASA astronaut
- David Meade, conspiracy theorist and book author, predicted that a hidden planet called Nibiru would collide with Earth on September 23, 2017
- Edmund Meade-Waldo (1855–1934), English ornithologist and conservationist
- Euthanasia Sherman Meade (1836–1895), first president of The Woman's Medical Club of California
- James Meade (1907–1995), British economist and winner of the 1977 Nobel Prize in Economics
- Michael J. Meade (born 1944), Mythopoetic branch of the Men's Movement
- Richard Henry Meade (1814–1899), British entomologist & arachnologist
- Robin Meade (born 1969), television news anchor
- Theodosia Meade, Countess of Clanwilliam (1744–1817), landowner in Ireland
- Thomas Meade (1936–2022), British epidemiologist
- Tom Meade (1939–2013), American automobile designer and dealer

== Fictional characters ==
- Alexis Meade, character in Ugly Betty
- Bradford Meade, character in Ugly Betty
- Claire Meade, character in Ugly Betty
- Daniel Meade, character in Ugly Betty

== See also ==
- Mead (disambiguation)
- Meade (disambiguation)
- Meades, a surname
- Meads (disambiguation)
