= St. Philomena's Roman Catholic Church =

Church in New York, United States

Coordinates: 42°20′35.92″N 78°27′4.32″W

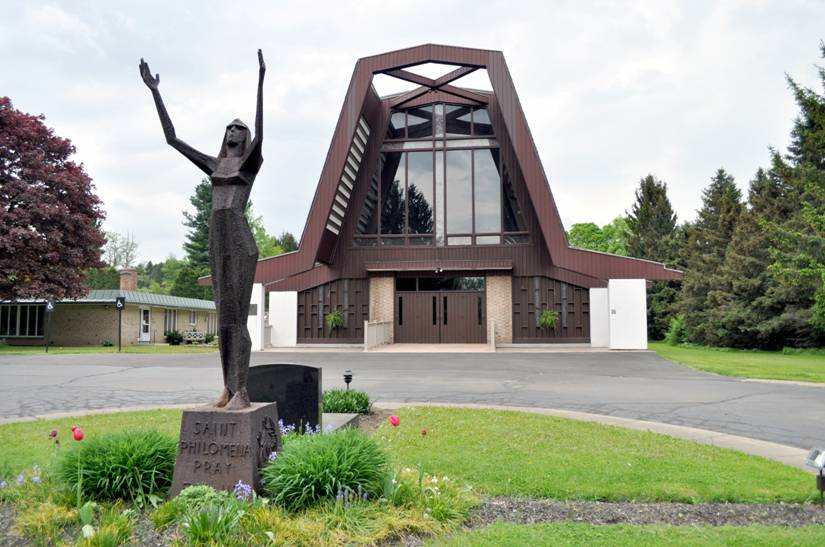
St. Philomena's RC Church in Franklinville, NY

The original St. Philomena's Roman Catholic Church was built in 1875 at a cost of $2,300 on a lot adjoining the Free Methodist Church in the village where the parish hall stands today. St. Philomena's congregation then built a new church in 1964 on Plymouth Avenue in Franklinville, NY; although it had actually been in use since Christmas of 1964, a formal dedication was held May 16, 1965. The resident priest at the time was the Rev. Henry J. Romanowski. When he died some years later in 1985, he was buried in the flowerbed by the statue in front of the church. Today the parish hall is still in use on Mill St. where the parish holds many events, functions, and parties.

The new church features stained glass windows, the Stations of the Cross, and the statue of St. Philomena which were all executed by Larry Griffis, Buffalo artist and sculptor. A statue of the church's patroness stands in the center of a circular drive in front of the church. It is made of welded low alloy steel, a new material with a limited oxidation feature. Also, completed in the parish building program is the brick rectory, at the left of the church. Mr. Griffis of Buffalo is the creator of Griffis Sculpture Park at Ashford Hollow.

In the fall of 2007, Holy Family R. C. Church in Machias, NY, closed and merged with St. Philomena’s parish. After the merger, then parish administrator, Fr. Joseph Zalacca consecrated the Holy Family chapel complete with the statues that used to stand in the Machias church. The chapel is located just left of the narthex.

Saint Philomena’s Roman Catholic Church 26 Plymouth Avenue Franklinville, NY 14737

Web: http://sites.google.com/site/saintphilomena14737

Some of this information was collected from: http://www.rootsweb.ancestry.com/~nycattar/towns/franklin/churches.htm
