= Mead High School (disambiguation) =

Mead High School is a public secondary school in Spokane, Washington

Mead High School may also refer to:

- Mead High School (Longmont, Colorado), a school in the St. Vrain Valley School District in Longmont, Colorado
- Mead High School, a high school in Nebraska

== See also ==
- M.E.A.D. Alternative High School or Mead Education Alternative Department Alternative High School, a learning community of non-traditional students and instructors in north Spokane, Washington
- Meade County High School, a school in Brandenburg, Kentucky
- Meade Senior High School, a school at Fort Meade, Maryland
