= Mead (disambiguation) =

Mead is an alcoholic drink made from honey.

Mead may also refer to:

== Places ==
=== United States ===
- Mead, Colorado, a Statutory Town
- Mead, Nebraska, a village
- Mead, Oklahoma, a town
- Mead, Washington, an unincorporated suburb and census-designated place
- Mead, West Virginia, an unincorporated community
- Mead, Wisconsin, a town
- Lake Mead, an artificial lake on the Colorado River in Arizona and Nevada created by the Hoover Dam
- Mead Township, Merrick County, Nebraska
- Mead Township, Belmont County, Ohio
- Mead Township, Pennsylvania
- Mead Wildlife Area, Wisconsin

=== Other places ===
- Mead, Ontario, Canada
- Mead (crater), a crater on Venus

== Companies ==
- Mead Johnson, a nutritional company
- The Mead Corporation, which merged with Westvaco to form MeadWestvaco, a paper and packaging manufacturing company

== People ==
- Mead (surname)
- Mead Schaeffer (1898–1980), American illustrator
- Mead Treadwell (born 1956), American businessman and politician

== Other uses ==
- Mead High School (disambiguation)
- Mead Art Museum, Amherst, Massachusetts, United States
- Mead Center for American Theater, a theater complex in Washington, DC
- Mead Memorial Chapel, Lewisboro, New York, United States, an Episcopal chapel on the National Register of Historic Places
- Mead Observatory, Columbus, Georgia, United States, former name of the WestRock Observatory
- Mead substation, a major electric power interconnection point just outside Boulder City, Nevada, United States
- MEAD (film), a 2022 science fiction film
- Mead, a meadow
- Mi'ad, also transliterated "mead", an Arabic term for resurrection

== See also ==
- Meade (disambiguation)
- Meads (disambiguation)
- Meadville (disambiguation)
- Mede (disambiguation)
