= UWW TV =

UWW-TV is a TV station located in Whitewater, Wisconsin that is mainly run by students at the University of Wisconsin –Whitewater. It offers programming that ranges from news, sports, and original content. Along with UWW-TV, University of Wisconsin–Whitewater also offer programs with their local radio station 91.7 The Edge.

== History ==
UWW-TV used to be known as Cable 6 and then Cable 19 back in the 80's and 90's When it switched over to UWW-TV in 2012, the programming mainly switched to student-based projects and student information programming. UWW-TV has had two directors over its lifetime. Dr. Peter Conover, who directed from 70's to the early 00's and cemented the foundation of UWW-TV. Jim Mead, who now directs UWW-TV, played a pivotal part in pushing UWW-TV into the social media realm. There is 12 hours of the day are new student programming and the other 12 hours are highlights and compilations of popular broadcasts.

== Programming ==
UWW-TV has five blocks of TV programming that cover original content, news, sports, supplement programing, and public service announcements. Their main form of television is located in “Original Programming” where they highlight horror, comedy, and reality dramas. Their comedy block is the most viewed original programs such as Bob is a Jerk, ECLAP, and Dude Sessions. Recently UWW-TV has started a new program on channel 101.1 showing classic sports and other classic programing. This program will air 16 hours a day for seven days a week.
