= Meadville =

Meadville may refer to:

- Meadville, Mississippi
- Meadville, Missouri
- Meadville, Nebraska
- Meadville, Pennsylvania, the largest U.S. city named Meadville
  - Meadville Area Senior High School
  - Meadville Medical Center
- Meadville (album), by David Thomas and Two Pale Boys
- Meadville Corporation, an oil company
- Meadville Lombard Theological School, a Unitarian Universalist seminary in Chicago
