= Mede =

Mede may refer to:

- A member of the Medes, an ancient Iranian people who lived in an area known as Media
- Mede, Lombardy, a comune (municipality) in Italy
- Joseph Mede, biblical scholar
- Petra Mede (born 1970), Swedish comedian and television host
- Robert Mede
- William Mede
- Attrebus Mede, protagonist of The Infernal City and Lord of Souls novels

== See also ==
- Mead (disambiguation)
- Meade (disambiguation)
- Medes (disambiguation)
