= Merlin Mead =

American Underground Railroad conductor (1794–1874)

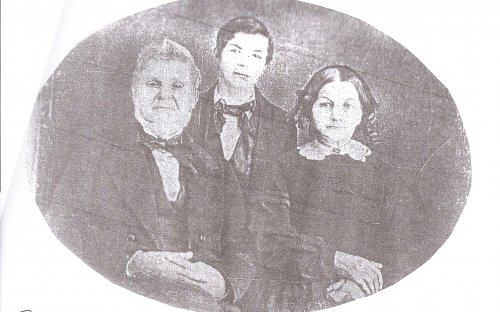
Merlin, Polly, and son Eddie Mead

Merlin Mead (August 18, 1794 – December 23, 1874) was an Underground Railroad conductor and station master, one of several people from the hamlet of Cadiz within Franklinville, New York that sheltered and aided enslaved people who escaped and headed for freedom in Canada. He was a farmer, schoolmaster, town clerk, postmaster, and justice of the peace. He operated a public house, until he attended a temperance meeting and stopped selling liquor. Mead was ordained an elder and was an active leader of the First Presbyterian Church in Franklinville.

== Early life ==
Merlin was born August 18, 1794, in South Salem, Westchester County, New York. His parents were Lois and Clark Mead,. Clark, a farmer in South Salem, was the son of Reverend Solomon Mead (1725-1812), the pastor of the South Salem Presbyterian Church. The Mead family came to the British Colonies from Kent, England in the 1630s, eventually settling in Greenwich, Connecticut, before Solomon moved to South Salem to start the church.

Merlin worked on the family farm in the summer and in the winter taught at the district school. On November 14, 1820, he married Polly Clark, the daughter of Eli Clark of Waterbury, Connecticut. They had eight children, born between 1821 and 1842.

== Career ==
Mead and his wife, along with Mr. McKean, operated a night school in New York City. The Meads are also said to have established a school for disadvantaged boys in the city. Two of their students were Richard March Hoe and Robert Hoe, printing press inventors. The Meads were members of the Cedar Street Presbyterian Church.

Polly's health declined while living in the city and they moved to Franklinville, New York in the fall of 1830. They established a public house on Elm Street with his sister Laura and brother-in-law Seth Ely. It was later known as Ten Broeck House. After attending an American Temperance Society meeting in Arcade, New York in 1833, he and his wife decided to destroy barrels of liquor and to never sell alcoholic beverages again. For two winters, Mead taught at the old red schoolhouse. He served as Town Clerk and Justice of the Peace in Franklinville. When a post office was opened in Cadiz, Mead was appointed postmaster. He was also a farmer.

The Meads were a fixture within the town's First Presbyterian Church. Mead was ordained an elder of the church. He filled in for the minister when needed. He was also the Clerk of Sessions and Superintendent.

== Underground Railroad ==
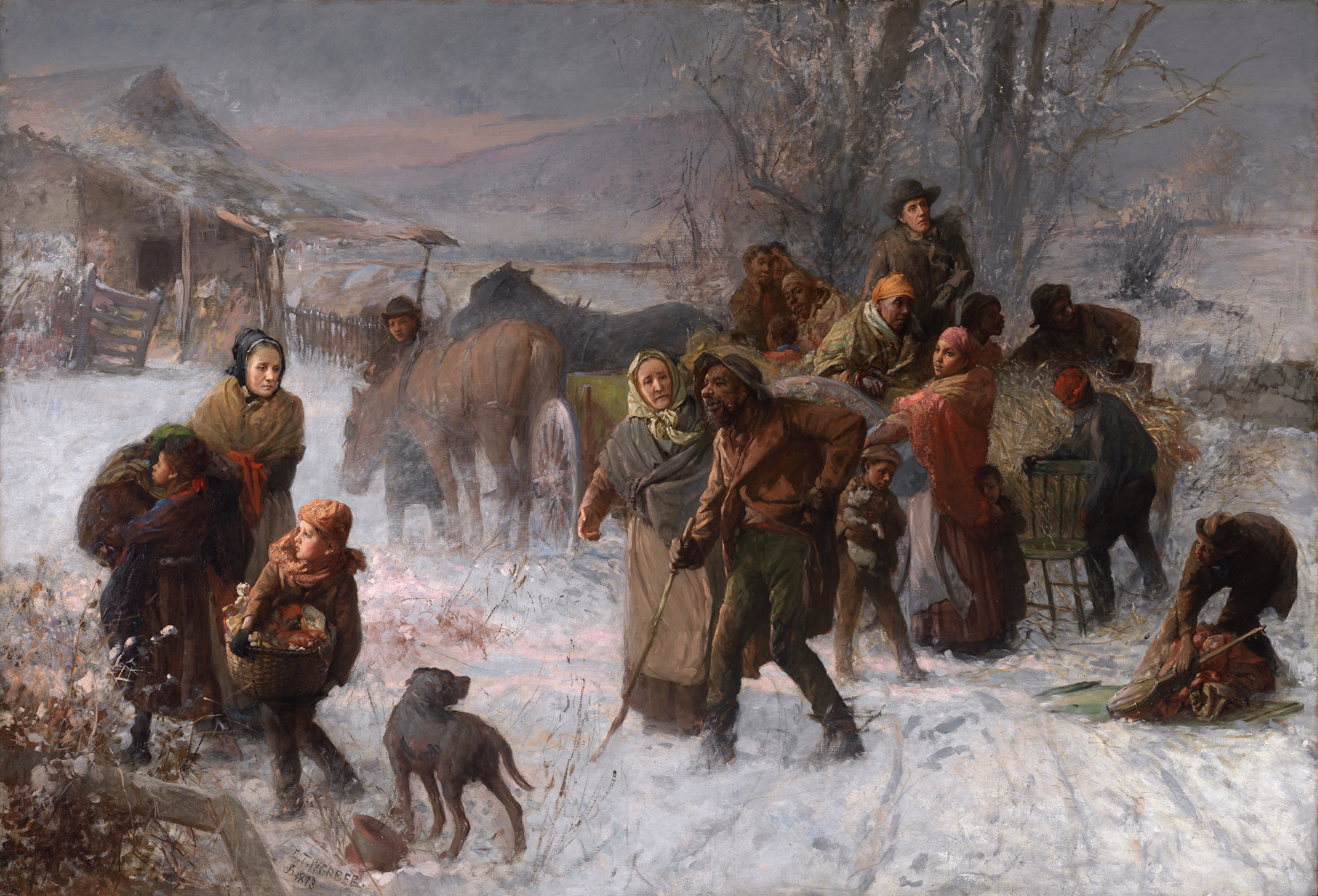
Charles T. Webber, The Underground Railroad, 1893

Beginning in February 1834, he was the secretary of the American Anti-Slavery Society in Franklinville. The Meads moved to Cadiz in 1841, where he was known and subject to some harassment for being an abolitionist. They lived first in the Howe-Prescott House, which is now owned by the Ischua Valley Historical Society. They then built a larger house that was later destroyed in a fire. His house was known to be an Underground Railroad station that operated before and during the Civil War.

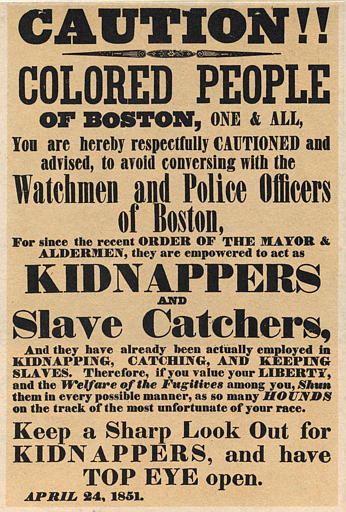
Poster that warns escaped slaves that local officials and lawmen are required by the Fugitive Slave Act of 1850 to return them to their slaveholder, Boston, 1851

Mead collaborated with others in the area: the innkeeper at the Stagecoach Inn, John Burlingame, Alfred Rice, and Isaac Searle. They worked clandestinely, helping former enslaved people, knowingly at risk of being sent to jail or face heavy fines. See: Fugitive Slave Act of 1793 and 1850

Throughout the Underground Railroad network, railroad terms were used to communicate their activities. Lines were the routes north and into Canada. Conductors transported people, identified as passengers and freight, between stations, meaning Underground Railroad people's property. Stationmasters hid and aided freedom seekers on their property. Stockholders provided the funds for clothing, food, and money.

Mead's house was located on two routes through Cattaraugus County, New York. Freedom seekers traveled from Olean, New York to Mead's House at Cardiz. One route took passengers from the Orlean area to Buck Pond, where they rode on canal boats or rafts up the Ischua Creek. Another route went from Orlean through Maplehurst and the Hatch Place near Hinsdale, New York before arriving at the Mead's House at Cadiz in Franklinville. There were other stops in the Cadiz area, including the Stagecoach Inn and Isaac Searle's property on Route 16.

Alfred Rice transported passengers from Franklinville to the next Underground Railroad stop at East Aurora. Along the way, men, women, and children hid under straw for their safety. Sometimes, travelers went to Arcade (before East Aurora), on their way to Buffalo, New York.

A historical marker was installed along Route 90 near Ischua Creek by the Pomeroy Foundation. It is located where travelers left the rafts in Cadiz and went one of four places. They walked to the Mead's house, went through a tunnel to the Stagecoach Inn, went to John Burlingame's house or went to Isaac Searl's farm. Located in the hamlet of Cadiz in Franklinville, it recognizes the efforts taken in Cattaraugus County to help escaped slaves make it to Canada from the 1830s through the Civil War. Another historical marker for Cadiz recognizes the citizens who served on the Underground Railroad. It is located on County Road 98, .1 mile east of Route 69. The part of the Cadiz marker that refers to the Underground Railroad states:

Cadiz became a center of the Underground Railroad. Escaping slaves were rafted up Ischua Creek and hidden in area homes and the Stagecoach Inn at the four corners. Families known to be involved in this activity were the Meads, Burlingames and Searles. The Howe Prescott Pioneer House circa 1814, located on this site, serves as a museum for the Ischua Valley Historical Society. Abolitionist Merlin Mead lived here in 1841.

== Parcel post system ==
Mead's Congressman introduced a bill to send packages to soldiers. Mead had written to his Congressman when he learned that a neighbor's son had not been able to receive the boots he requested from home. The bill was passed so that all soldiers could receive packages. The program led to the current parcel post system.

== Death ==
Mead died on December 23, 1874, at his home in Cadiz. Polly died May 19, 1882. They were interred at the Mount Prospect Cemetery.
