= Major C. Mead =

American politician

Major C. Mead (1858–1925) was a member of the Wisconsin State Senate.

== Biography ==
Mead was born on June 26, 1858, in Lyndon, Sheboygan County, Wisconsin, as the son of Abel Mead and Permelia Peck . His father died when he was 1 year old, and in 1863 his mother remarried his father's younger brother Clark R. Mead. On June 29, 1881, Mead married Rose Robinson (1859–1951). They moved to Plymouth, Wisconsin, and had three children. Mead died on February 19, 1925, and is interred at the Union Cemetery in Plymouth.

== Career ==
Mead was elected to the Senate in 1888 and remained a member until 1892. He was a Democrat.
