= James R. Mead (pioneer) =

American politician (1836–1910)

James R. Mead

James R. Mead (May 3, 1836 – March 31, 1910) was a plainsman, Kansas pioneer, one of the founders of Wichita, Kansas and state legislator. He was active in seeking to protect the rights of the Kansas Indian tribes. He aided in directing the cattle drives along the Chisholm Trail to the city. In 1871, he was instrumental in bringing the Wichita & Southwestern Railroad to Wichita. He possessed a lifelong interest in biology and ethnology. Later in life, he wrote articles for the Kansas State Historical Society and for the Kansas Academy of Science. His memoirs were published (1986, 2008) in the book, Hunting and Trading on the Great Plains 1859-1875 [Rowfant Press 2008, ISBN 978-1-929731-07-7] .

== Biography ==
James R. Mead was born in New Haven, Vermont to the Reverend Enoch Mead (born 1809; graduated Yale University 1830; ordained Presbyterian minister 1833) and Mary Emmes James. The family settled on a farm purchased near Davenport, Iowa in 1837. There Mead acquired his appreciation of nature and the American frontier. At the age of 14, he attended Iowa College (preparatory school) in Davenport and also had one year of college at age 19. James R. Mead arrived in Kansas Territory in 1859, having ridden in from his home in Iowa, and was soon involved in trading with the Indians. He was a Kansas pioneer and businessman. The trading post he established in the Arkansas Valley in 1864 was the first building on the site that was to become Wichita - a city he was instrumental in founding and developing. He later served in the State Senate, but one of his early business partners was Jesse Chisholm who had a trading post in Indian Territory and it was Chisholm's frequent trips up to get supplies from Mr. Mead during the Civil War that caused the route to be called the Chisholm Trail. In 1871 Mr. Mead was the guiding force behind the move to bring the railroad down from Newton to Wichita. Mr. Mead had a lifelong interest in archaeology, natural history, and ethnology. He wrote many articles for the Kansas State Historical Society and the Kansas Academy of Sciences. Late in life, he dictated his memories of his early days in Kansas which were later published in his book Hunting and Trading on the Great Plains, 1859 - 1875.

== Hunting and Trading, 1859 - 1875 ==
James R. Mead arrived in Kansas Territory in 1859 at the age of 23 when the land was still the ancestral home of the Osage, Kansas, Kiowa, Comanche and many other Indian tribes. Vast herds of buffalo in the tens of millions still roamed from their northern range in Canada to southern Texas. The Santa Fe Trail and the Oregon Trail crisscrossed the state. The Santa Fe Trail originated near Westport, Kansas. The wagons, carrying 8 to 10 thousand pounds of goods with as many as 10 to 30 oxen or Missouri mules traveled all the way to Santa Fe. In the process, a huge trail of 60 to 100 feet wide was worn smooth and solid by the constant travel.

Mead arrived when the land was a "hunter's paradise". There was still not a foot of railroad track in the territory. Hunting in the Smoky Hills off the Saline River (Kansas), he observed:

'The whole country had the appearance of a well-kept park belonging to some English nobleman. The grass was eaten down close by the buffalo and paths ran in every direction. The country was well watered by pure streams fringed by belts of timber and the high buttes was clothed with grass to their summits.'.

In 1860 Mead established a camp on Spillman Creek northwest of present-day Salina. For several years he traded with the Sioux, Cheyenne and Kaw Indians before Indian troubles convinced him that a move was in order for the safety of himself and his family.

In the Summer of 1863, Mead left the Smoky Hills and established a trading post at Towanda in Butler County, Kansas. For the next several years Mead successfully operated his trading post. He continued trading with the various Indian tribes and supplying other traders including Jesse Chisholm.

== Treaty of the Little Arkansas ==
On October 17, 1865, the United States and all of the major Plains Indians Tribes signed a treaty on the Little Arkansas River. It was there, that Mead first met Kit Carson who was representing the government.

== Wichita ==
In 1868, along with Governor Crawford and others, he incorporated the town of Wichita. Mead insisted on the name Wichita as the Wichita Indians had occupied the town site for several years.

== Notes ==
1. James R. Mead, Hunting and Trading on the Great Plains, 1859 - 1875, Edited by Jones, Introduction by Ignace Mead Jones, Rowfant Press, Wichita, 2008. 2. KANSAS. A Cyclopedia of State History, Embracing Events, Institutions, Industries, Counties, Cities, Towns, Prominent Persons, Etc., Volume 3, Part 1, Pages 456–459, Standard Pub. Co. Chicago : 1912.
