= James R. Mead (judge) =

American judge and politician (died 1934)

Member of the Connecticut Senate from the 27th district district
- In office 1915–1921
- Preceded by: Dean Foster
- Succeeded by: Matthew H. Kenealy

Member of the Connecticut House of Representatives from Greenwich
- In office 1903–1905 Serving with Whitman S. Mead
- Preceded by: John H. Boswell; James F. Walsh
- Succeeded by: Seaman Mead; George S. Ray

Personal details
- Born: 1860 or 1861 Greenwich, Connecticut, U.S.
- Died: January 9, 1934 (aged 73) Greenwich, Connecticut, U.S.
- Party: Republican

James R. Mead (1860 or 1861 – January 9, 1934) was an American judge and politician from Connecticut.

== Personal life ==
Mead was born in Greenwich, Connecticut, in 1860 or 1861. His parents were Benjamin C. and Mary E. Ritch Mead. He married Elizabeth M. Stone, who survived him. Mead was a member of the Sons of the American Revolution.

== Career ==
A Republican, Mead was elected to the Connecticut House of Representatives in 1902 and served one term representing the town of Greenwich. From 1915 to 1921, he served in the Connecticut State Senate, representing the 27th district.

== Death ==
Mead died on January 9, 1934, at age 73.
