= Burgh (surname) =

- Pronunciation: /ˈbʌrə, ˈbʌroʊ, bɜːr(ɡ)/ BURR-ə, BURR-oh, BUR(G)
- Language: English

Origin
- Language: French
- Derivation: de Burgh
- Meaning: "(of the) borough"
- Region of origin: England

Other names
- Variant forms: Burgo/de Burgo, de Búrca, Burke, Bourke

Burgh is an Anglo-Norman surname. Notable people with the surname include:

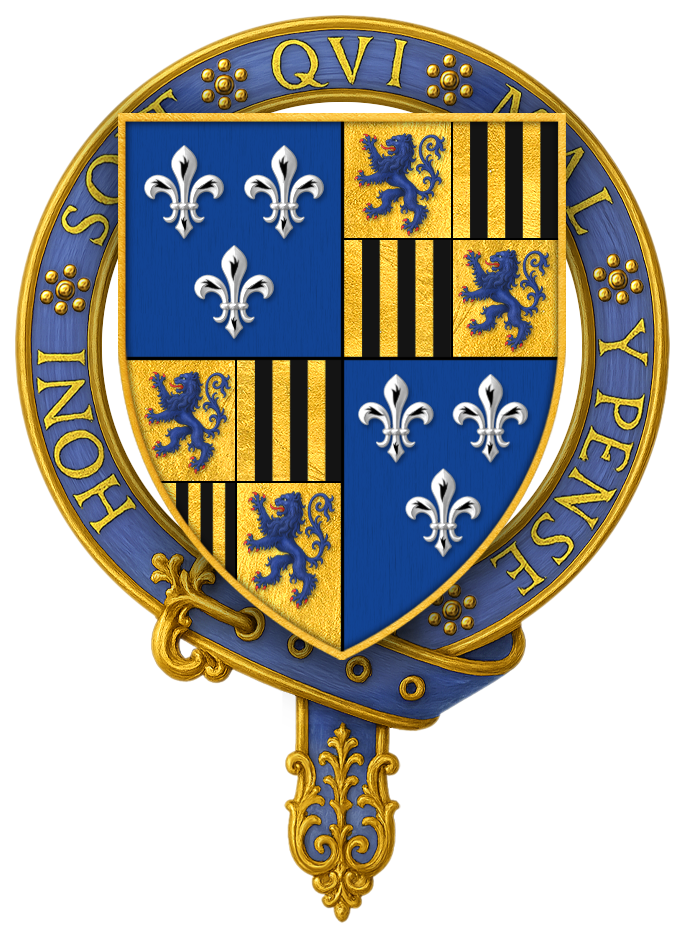
Arms of Thomas Burgh, 1st Baron Burgh, at the time of his installation as a Knight of the Most Noble Order of the Garter

== Surname ==
=== A ===
- Albert Burgh (1593–1647), Dutch physician

=== J ===
- James Burgh (1714–1775), English Whig politician
- John Burgh (disambiguation), multiple people:
  - John Burgh I (fl. 1399), MP for Bodmin in 1399
  - John Burgh II (died 1434), MP for Surrey 1413–1416
  - John Burgh III (died 1436), MP for Rutland 1413–1415 and Leicestershire 1421 and 1433
  - John Burgh (MP for Brackley), see Brackley (UK Parliament constituency)
  - John Burgh (MP for Wallingford), see Wallingford (UK Parliament constituency)
  - John Burgh (civil servant) (1925–2013), senior British civil servant and President of Trinity College, Oxford

=== T ===
- Thomas Burgh (disambiguation), multiple people:
  - Thomas Burgh of Gainsborough (c.1431–1496), English peer and High Sheriff of Lincolnshire 1460
  - Thomas Burgh, 1st Baron Burgh (c.1488–1550), English peer and 5th Baron Strabolgi
  - Thomas Burgh, 3rd Baron Burgh (c.1558–1597), English peer, 7th Baron Strabolgi, Lord Deputy of Ireland 1597
  - Thomas Burgh (1670–1730) or de Burgh, Irish military engineer, architect, MP and Surveyor General of Ireland
  - Thomas Burgh (Lanesborough MP) (1696–1758), Anglo-Irish politician and MP
  - Thomas Burgh (died 1759) (1707–1759), Irish politician and MP
  - Thomas Burgh (1754–1832), Irish politician and MP
  - Thomas Burgh (MP died 1810), Irish politician and MP for Kilbeggan, Clogher and Fore
  - Thomas Burgh (priest) (1786–1845), Dean of Cloyne

=== U ===
- Ulysses Burgh (1632–1692), Irish Anglican cleric and Bishop of Ardagh
- Ulysses Burgh, 2nd Baron Downes (1788−1864) Irish soldier and politician

== See also ==
- de Burgh, surname
- DeBerg, surname
- Burke (disambiguation)
- de Burgh-Canning
- House of Burgh, an Anglo-Norman and Hiberno-Norman dynasty founded in 1193
- Clanricarde (Mac William Uachtar/Upper Mac William) or Galway (Upper Connaught) Burkes
- Earl of Clanricarde, earldom in the Peerage of Ireland created in 1543 and 1800
- Lord of Connaught, title claimed in the Peerage of Ireland
- Earl of Ulster, earldom created in the Peerage of Ireland in 1264
- Bourke (disambiguation)
- Burgo (disambiguation)
- De Burghs Bridge, road bridge in Sydney, Australia
- Bourg (disambiguation)
- Dubourg, surname
