= Thomas Burgh =

Thomas Burgh may refer to:

- Thomas Burgh of Gainsborough (c. 1431–1496), English peer and High Sheriff of Lincolnshire 1460
- Thomas Burgh, 1st Baron Burgh (c. 1488–1550), English peer and 5th Baron Strabolgi
- Thomas Burgh, 3rd Baron Burgh (c. 1558–1597), English peer, 7th Baron Strabolgi, Lord Deputy of Ireland 1597
- Thomas Burgh (1670–1730) or Thomas de Burgh, Irish military engineer, architect, MP and Surveyor General of Ireland
- Thomas Burgh (Lanesborough MP) (1696–1758), Anglo-Irish politician and MP
- Thomas Burgh (died 1759) (1707–1759), Irish politician and MP
- Thomas Burgh (1754–1832), Irish politician and MP
- Thomas Burgh (MP died 1810), Irish politician and MP for Kilbeggan, Clogher and Fore
- Thomas Burgh (priest) (1786–1845), Dean of Cloyne

== See also ==
- Burgh (surname)
- de Burgh, surname
- DeBerg, surname
