= Borgh =

Borgh may refer to:

- Borve (disambiguation): places in Scotland named "Borve"
- Tithing: a historical administrative county subdivision which, in the county of Kent, England, is known as a "borgh"

== See also ==
- Berg (disambiguation)
- Burg (disambiguation)
- Borg (disambiguation)
- Bourg (disambiguation)
- Bergh (disambiguation)
- Burgh (disambiguation)
