= De Burgh =

de Burgh
- Blazon: Or, a cross gules
- Pronunciation: English: /d ˈbɜːr/ Irish: [də ˈbuːɾˠkə]
- Language: English

Origin
- Language: French
- Meaning: "of the borough"
- Region of origin: England, Ireland

Other names
- Variant forms: de Bourgh, Burgo/de Burgo
- Anglicisation: Burgh
- Derivatives: de Búrca, Burke, Bourke

de Burgh (English: /dəˈbɜːr/ də-BUR, French: [dəbuʁ]; Irish: de Búrca; Latin: Burgo, de Burgo) is an Anglo-Norman surname deriving from the ancient Anglo-Norman and Hiberno-Norman noble dynasty, the House of Burgh. In Ireland, the descendants of William de Burgh (c.1160–1206) had the surname de Burgh which was gaelicised in Irish as de Búrca and over the centuries became Búrc then Burke and Bourke.

Notable people with this name include:

== Surname ==
=== A ===
- Aoife de Búrca (1885–1974), born Eva Burke, Red Cross nurse during the Irish Easter Rising

=== C ===
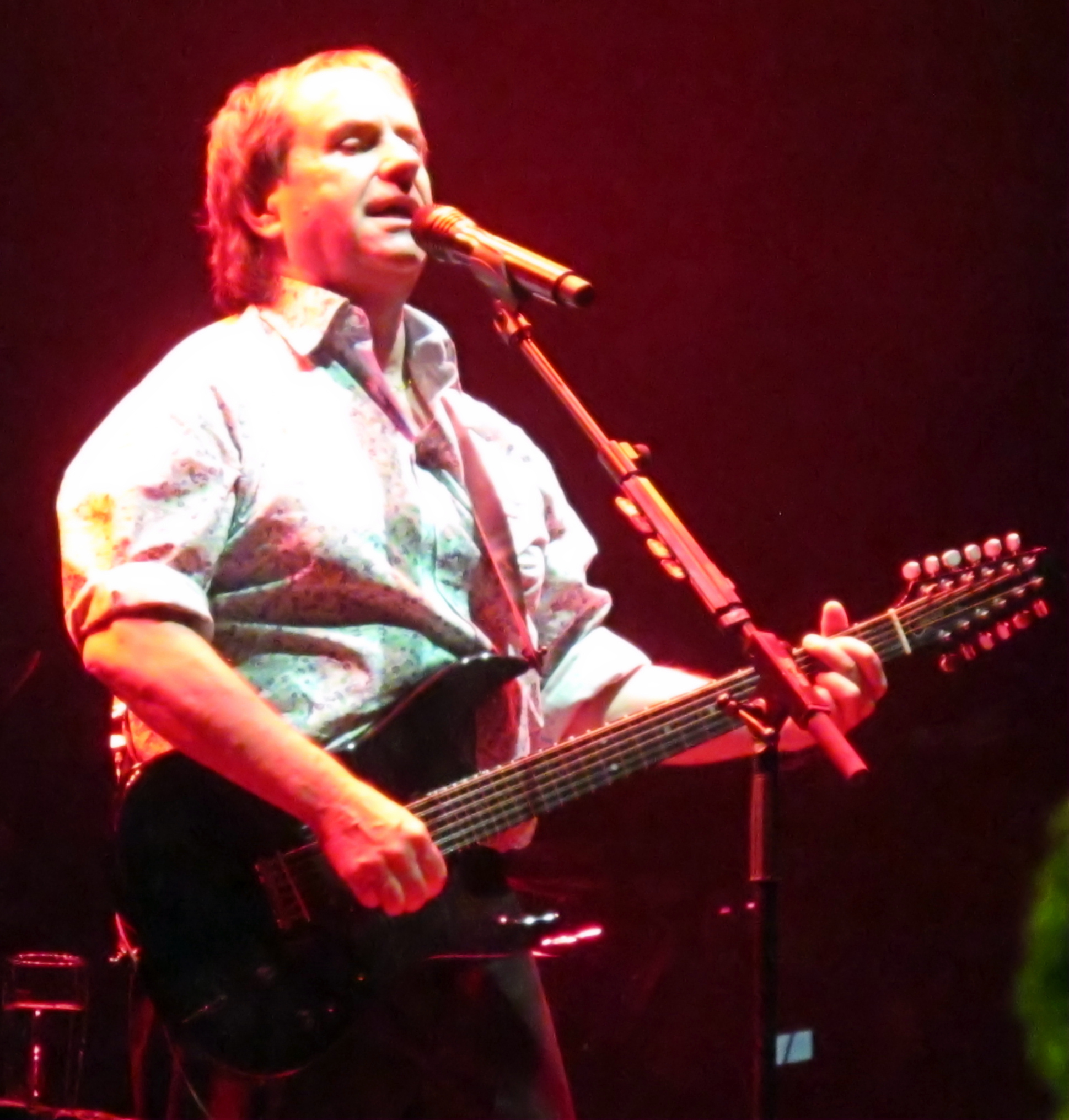
Chris de Burgh

- Coralie de Burgh (1924–2015), British Irish painter
- Cameron de Burgh (born 1971), Australian Paralympic swimmer
- Chris de Burgh (born 1948), musician and songwriter

=== D ===
- David de Burca or David de Burgh, 15th Mac William Iochtar (alive 1537), Irish chieftain and noble

=== E ===
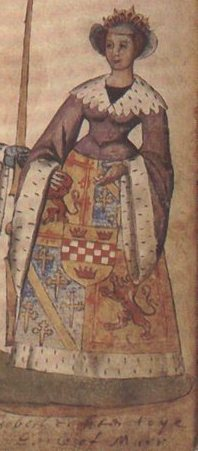
Elizabeth de Burgh, Queen Consort of Scotland

- Edmond Albanach de Burgh (d.1375), Lord of Connaught
- Edmond de Burca or Edmond de Burgh, 12th Mac William Iochtar (died 1527), Irish chieftain and noble
- Edmund na Féasóige de Burca or Edmund de Burgh, 4th Mac William Iochtar (died 1458), Irish chieftain and noble
- Elizabeth de Burgh (disambiguation)
  - Elizabeth de Burgh (c.1289–1327), queen of Scotland, wife of Robert the Bruce
  - Elizabeth de Clare or de Burgh (1295–1360), founder of Clare College, sister-in-law of Queen Elizabeth de Burgh
  - Elizabeth de Burgh, 4th Countess of Ulster (1332–1363) granddaughter of Elizabeth de Clare
- Emily Charlotte de Burgh, Countess of Cork (1828–1912), British poet and writer
- Eric de Burgh (1881–1973), British Indian Army officer
- Ernest Macartney de Burgh (1863–1929), Irish-born Australian civil engineer

=== G ===
- Geoffrey de Burgh (c.1180–1228), English Bishop of Ely
- Gylle de Burgh (fl. 1332), Anglo-Irish noblewoman

=== H ===
- Henry de Burgh, 1st Marquess of Clanricarde (1742–1797), Irish peer and politician
- Hubert de Burgh, 1st Earl of Kent (c.1180–1243), Justiciar of England and Ireland
- Hubert de Burgh (cricketer) (1879–1960), Irish cricketer and Royal Naval Officer
- Hubert de Burgh-Canning, 2nd Marquess of Clanricarde (1832–1916), Irish politician
- Hugh de Burgh (d.c.1351), Irish crown official and judge
- Hugo de Burgh (born 1949), British journalism theorist and academic

=== J ===
- John de Burgh (disambiguation)
  - John de Burgh (d.1271), son of Hubert de Burgh and son in law of William de Lanvallei
  - John de Burgh (1286–1313) (1286–1313), Irish heir apparent to the Earldom of Ulster
  - John Smith de Burgh, 11th Earl of Clanricarde or John Smith Burke (1720–1782), Irish peer
  - John de Burgh, 13th Earl of Clanricarde (1744–1808), Irish nobleman, politician and cricketer
  - John de Burgh (bishop) (1590–1667), Roman Catholic archbishop of Tuam
  - Jon de Burgh Miller (21st century), English science fiction writer

=== M ===
- Margery de Burgh (1224–1252), Norman-Irish noblewoman

=== R ===
- Richard de Burgh (disambiguation)
  - Richard Mor de Burgh (c.1194–1242), eldest son of William de Burgh
  - Richard Óg de Burgh, 2nd Earl of Ulster (1259–1326), Irish nobleman
  - Richard Burke, 4th Earl of Clanricarde or Richard de Burgh (1572–1635), Irish nobleman
  - Richard Burke, 8th Earl of Clanricarde or Richard de Burgh (d.1704), Irish nobleman
  - Risdeárd de Burca or Ruchard de Burgh, 6th Mac William Íochtar (died 1473), Irish chieftain and noble

=== T ===
- Thomas de Burgh (1670–1730), Irish soldier, architect and politician
- Tomás Óg de Burca or Tomás Óg de Burgh, 5th Mac William Iochtar (died 1460), Irish chieftain and noble
- Thomas mac Edmond Albanach de Burca or Thomas de Burgh, 2nd Mac William Iochtar (died 1402), Irish chieftain and noble

=== U ===
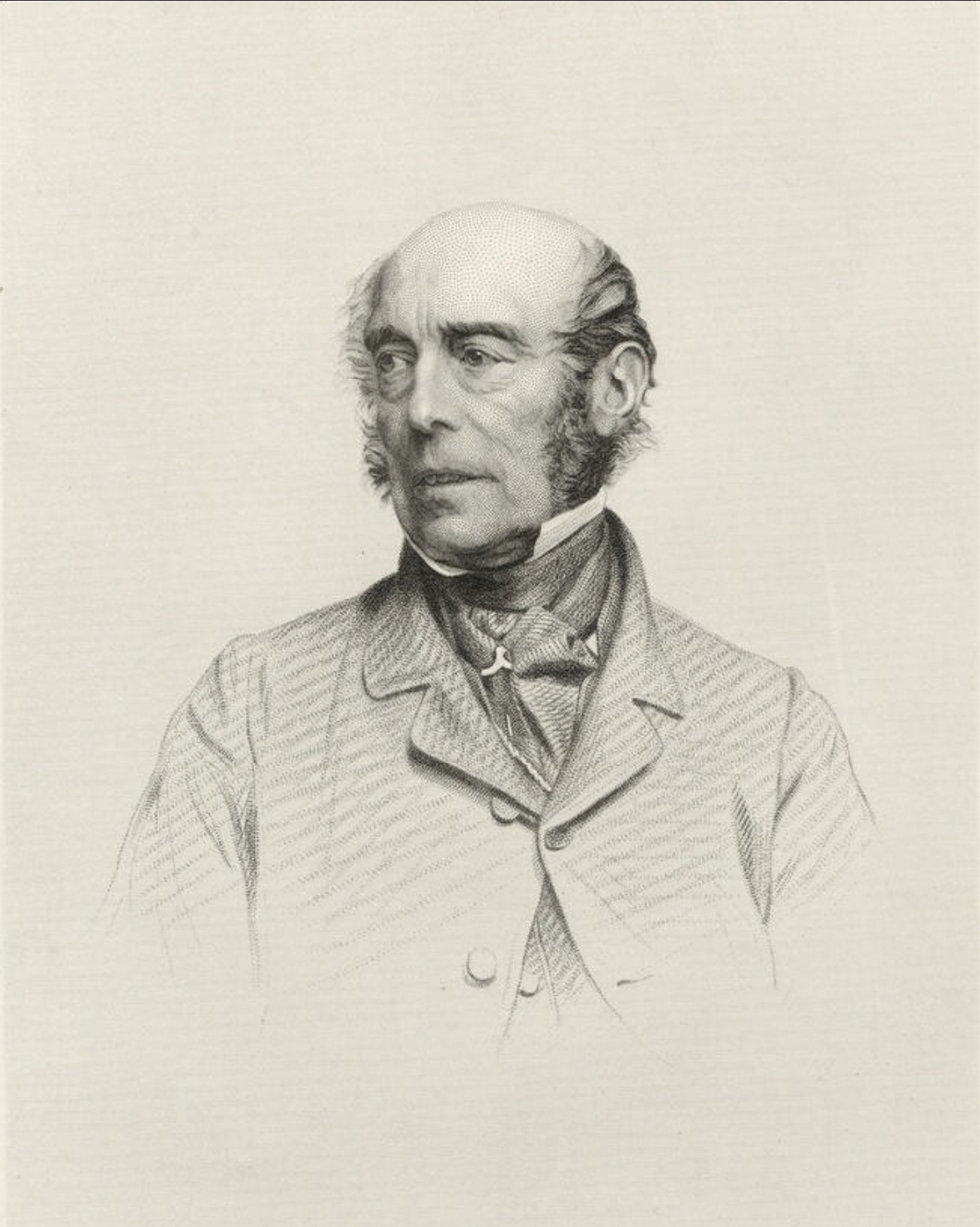
Ulick de Burgh, 1st Marquess of Clanricarde

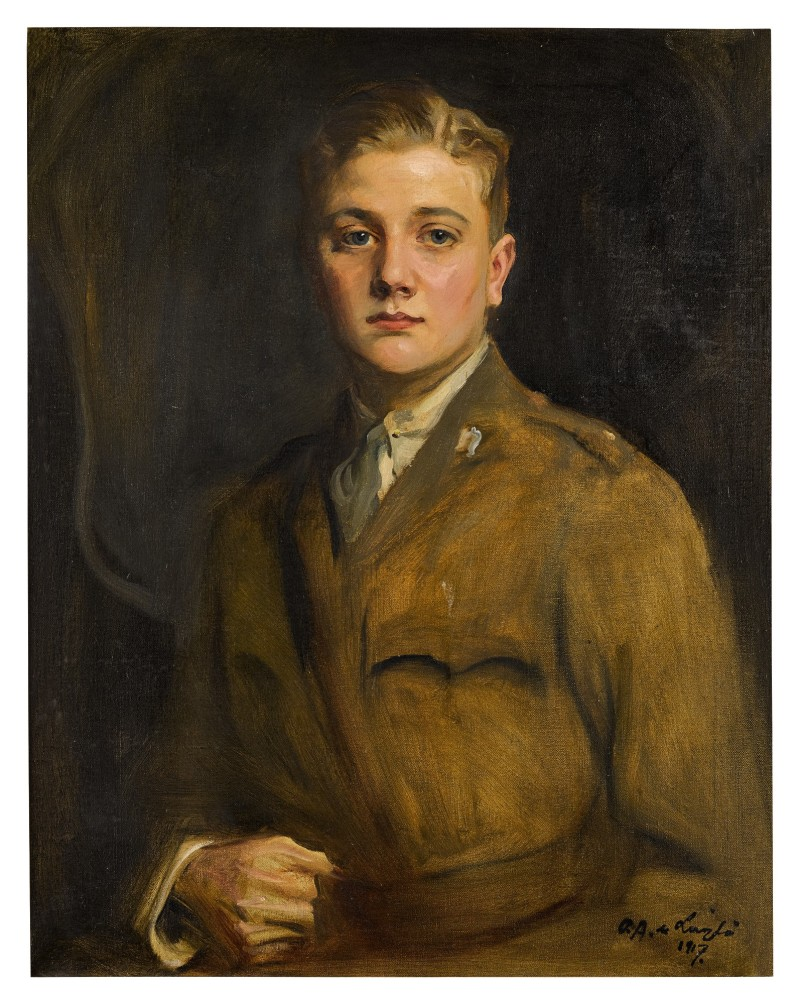
Ulick de Burgh Browne, 7th Marquess of Sligo

- Ulick de Burgh (disambiguation)
  - Ulick Burke of Umhaill or Ulick de Burgh (d.1343), founder of the Bourkes of the Owles
  - Ulick Burke of Annaghkeen or Ulick de Burgh, 1st Clanricarde or Mac William Uachtar (d.1343/1353), Irish chieftain and noble
  - Ulick an Fhiona Burke Ulick de Burgh, 3rd Clanricarde or Mac William Uachtar (d.1424), Irish chieftain and noble
  - Ulick Fionn Burke or Ulick de Burgh, 6th Clanricarde or Mac William Uachtar (d.1509), Irish chieftain and noble
  - Ulick Burke, 3rd Earl of Clanricarde or Ulick de Burgh (died 1601), Irish noble
  - Ulick Burke, 1st Marquess of Clanricarde or Ulick de Burgh (1604–1657), Irish noble
  - Ulick Burke, 1st Viscount Galway or Ulick de Burgh (1670–1691), Irish Jacobite
  - Sir Ulick Burke, 3rd Baronet or Ulick de Burgh (d.1708), of Glinsk, MP for Galway County
  - Ulick de Burgh, 1st Marquess of Clanricarde (1802–1874), British whig politician
  - Ulick Canning de Burgh, Lord Dunkellin (1827–1867), Anglo-Irish soldier and politician
  - Ulick Burke (politician) (born 1943), Irish Fine Gael politician
  - Peter Burke (historian) or Ulick Peter Burke (born 1937), British historian
  - Sir Ulick Burke, 1st Baronet (c.1594–c.1660) of the Burke Baronets
  - Sir Ulick Burke, 8th Baronet (d.1759) of the Burke Baronets
- Ulysses Burgh, 2nd Baron Downes or Ulysses de Burgh (1788–1864), Irish soldier and politician

=== W ===
- Walter de Burgh, 1st Earl of Ulster (c.1230–1271), founder of Athassel Priory
- Walter mac Thomas de Burca or Walter de Burgh, 3rd Mac William Iochtar (died 1440), Irish chieftain and noble
- William de Burgh (disambiguation)
  - William de Burgh (1157–1206), Lord of Connaught
  - William Óg de Burgh (died 1270), Irish chieftain
  - William Donn de Burgh, 3rd Earl of Ulster (1312–1333), noble in the Peerage of Ireland
  - William de Burgh (MP) (1741–1808), Anglo-Irish theologian, politician and anti-slavery campaigner
  - William de Burgh (philosopher) (1866–1943), British philosopher.

== Given name ==
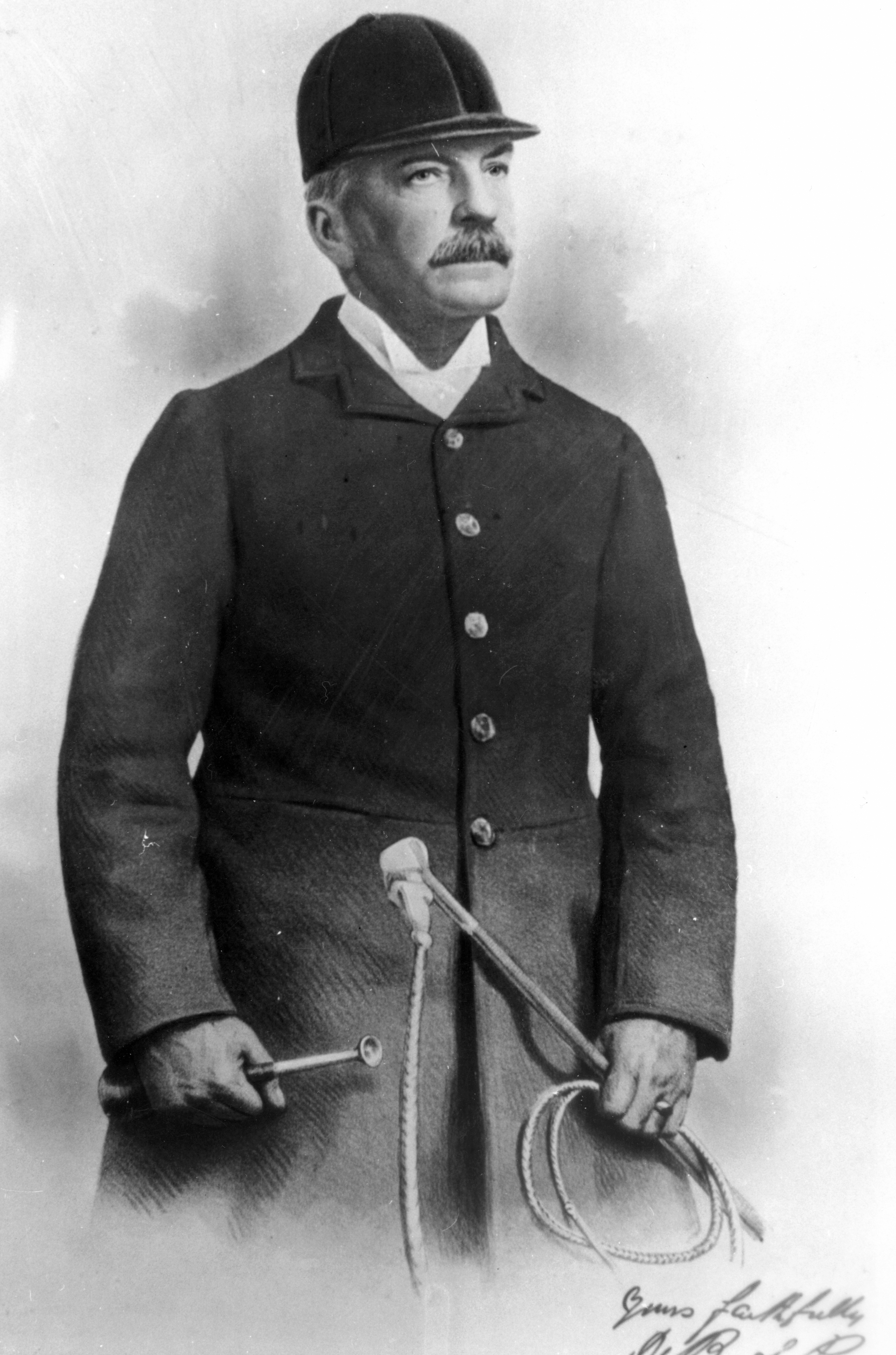
De Burgh Fitzpatrick Persse

- Danny Kinahan or Daniel de Burgh Kinahan (born 1958), Ulster Unionist Party (UUP) politician
- David Kenworthy, 11th Baron Strabolgi David Montague de Burgh Kenworthy (1914–2010), British peer
- De Burgh Fitzpatrick Persse (1840–1921), Australian politician
- Emily de Burgh Daly (1859–1935), Irish nurse, writer and traveller
- Garth Welch or Garth de Burgh Welch (born 1936), Australian dancer and choreographer
- Ivan De Burgh Daly (1893–1974), British experimental and animal physiologist
- Jon de Burgh Miller, British author
- Kenneth de Burgh Codrington (1899–1986), British archaeologist and art historian
- Reg Egan or Reginald Clarence De Burgh Egan (1927–2014), Australian rules footballer
- Stanton Welch or Stanton De Burgh Welch (born 1969), Australian dancer and choreographer
- Ulick de Burgh Browne, 7th Marquess of Sligo (1898–1941), British and Irish peer and British army officer

== Fictional characters ==
- Lady Catherine de Bourgh (character from Jane Austen's novel, Pride and Prejudice)

== See also ==
- Burke (disambiguation)
- House of Burgh, an Anglo-Norman and Hiberno-Norman dynasty founded in 1193
- Clanricarde (Mac William Uachtar/Upper Mac William) or Galway (Upper Connaught) Burkes
- de Burgh-Canning
- Earl of Clanricarde, earldom in the Peerage of Ireland created in 1543 and 1800
- Lord of Connaught, title claimed in the Peerage of Ireland
- Earl of Ulster, earldom created in the Peerage of Ireland in 1264
- Bourke (disambiguation)
- Burgo (disambiguation)
- De Burghs Bridge, road bridge in Sydney, Australia
- Bourg (disambiguation)
- Dubourg, surname
- DeBerg, surname
