= Bergh (disambiguation) =

Bergh, de Bergh, van den Bergh, or variant, may refer to:

- Bergh (surname)
- Van Den Bergh (surname)
- Van den Bergh catalogue, the VdB catalogue of reflection nebulae
- Gillis Gillisz. de Bergh, 17th century Dutch painter
- List of counts van Bergh
- Van Bergh countdom
- Bergh, former municipality in the Dutch province of Gelderland.
- Bergh Apton, village in England
- Bergh–Stoutenburgh House, in Hyde Park, New York, USA
- 6512 de Bergh (1987 SR1), the de Bergh asteroid or Bergh asteroid

== See also ==
- Berg (disambiguation)
- Burg (disambiguation)
- Borg (disambiguation)
- Burgh (disambiguation)
- Borgh (disambiguation)
- Bourg (disambiguation)
