= Burgh (disambiguation) =

A burgh is an autonomous corporate entity in Scotland.

For the Etymology, or original historical meaning of the word Burgh see here. see also List of generic forms in place names in Ireland and the United Kingdom.

Burgh may also refer to:

- Burgh, Suffolk, East Anglia, England, United Kingdom
- Burgh, Netherlands
- Burgh (surname)
- Burgh (Pokémon), a character of the Pokémon universe.
- Pittsburgh, Pennsylvania, (Nicknamed by some as Da Burgh)

== See also ==
- Burgh by Sands, Cumbria, England
- Burgh le Marsh, Lincolnshire, England
- Burgh next Aylsham village, Norfolk, England
- Burgh on Bain, Lincolnshire, England
- Baron Burgh
- Burgh Bypass
- Burgh Castle civil parish, Norfolk, England
- Burgh Castle Roman Site, at Burgh Castle, Norfolk, England
- Burgh Heath, Surrey, England
- Burgh House, London, England
- Burgh Island, Devon, England
- de Burgh
- van der Burgh
- Burh, a fortified town in Anglo-Saxon England
- Berg (disambiguation)
- Burg (disambiguation)
- Borg (disambiguation)
- Bourg (disambiguation)
- Bergh (disambiguation)
- Borgh (disambiguation)
