= Bergh (surname) =

Bergh is a surname of Scandinavian origin. Notable people with the surname include:

- Carl Martin Bergh (1849–1906), Norwegian-American immigrant associated with the settlement of Norge, Virginia
- Eva Bergh (1926–2013), Norwegian actress
- Gunnar Bergh (1909–1986) Swedish athlete
- Haagen Ludvig Bergh (1809–1863), Norwegian politician
- Henry Bergh (1813–1888), American businessman who founded the American Society for the Prevention of Cruelty to Animals
- Ilja Bergh (1927–2015), Danish pianist and composer
- Karl Bergh (1883–1954) Swedish track and field athlete who competed in the 1912 Summer Olympics
- Larry Bergh (born 1942), American former professional basketball player
- Odd Bergh (1937–2023), Norwegian athlete who specialized in the triple jump and long jump
- Olof Bergh (1643–1725), Swedish-South African explorer and Cape Colony official
- Richard Bergh (1858–1919), Swedish painter
- Rikard Bergh (born 1966), Swedish tennis player
- Rudolph Bergh (1824–1909), Danish physician and malacologist
- Rudolph Sophus Bergh (1859–1924), Danish composer
- Sverre Bergh (1920–2006), Norwegian spy in Nazi Germany during World War II
- Trond Bergh (born 1946), Norwegian economic historian

== See also ==
- Berg (surname)
- Burg (disambiguation)
