= Burcht =

Burcht, occasionally "Burght" in old English texts, refers to a castle or fortress in Dutch and Flemish.

Burcht may also refer to:

- Burcht, Antwerp, a village in the Flemish province of Antwerp, Belgium
- Antwerpen Burcht, a fortress in Antwerp, Belgium, now known as Het Steen
- Burcht van Leiden, an old fort in Leiden, Netherlands

== See also ==
- Burg (disambiguation)
- List of castles in Belgium
- List of castles in the Netherlands
