= Philips III van Wassenaer =

- Burgrave of Leiden, Lord of Wassenaar
- Coat of arms after becoming burgrave of Leiden
- Predecessor: Dirk II van Wassenaer
- Successor: Dirk III van Wassenaer
- Died: between 1343 and 1348

Philips III van Wassenaer (?- c. 1345) was an oldest son of the main branch of the Dutch noble family Van Wassenaer.

== Life ==
=== Family ===
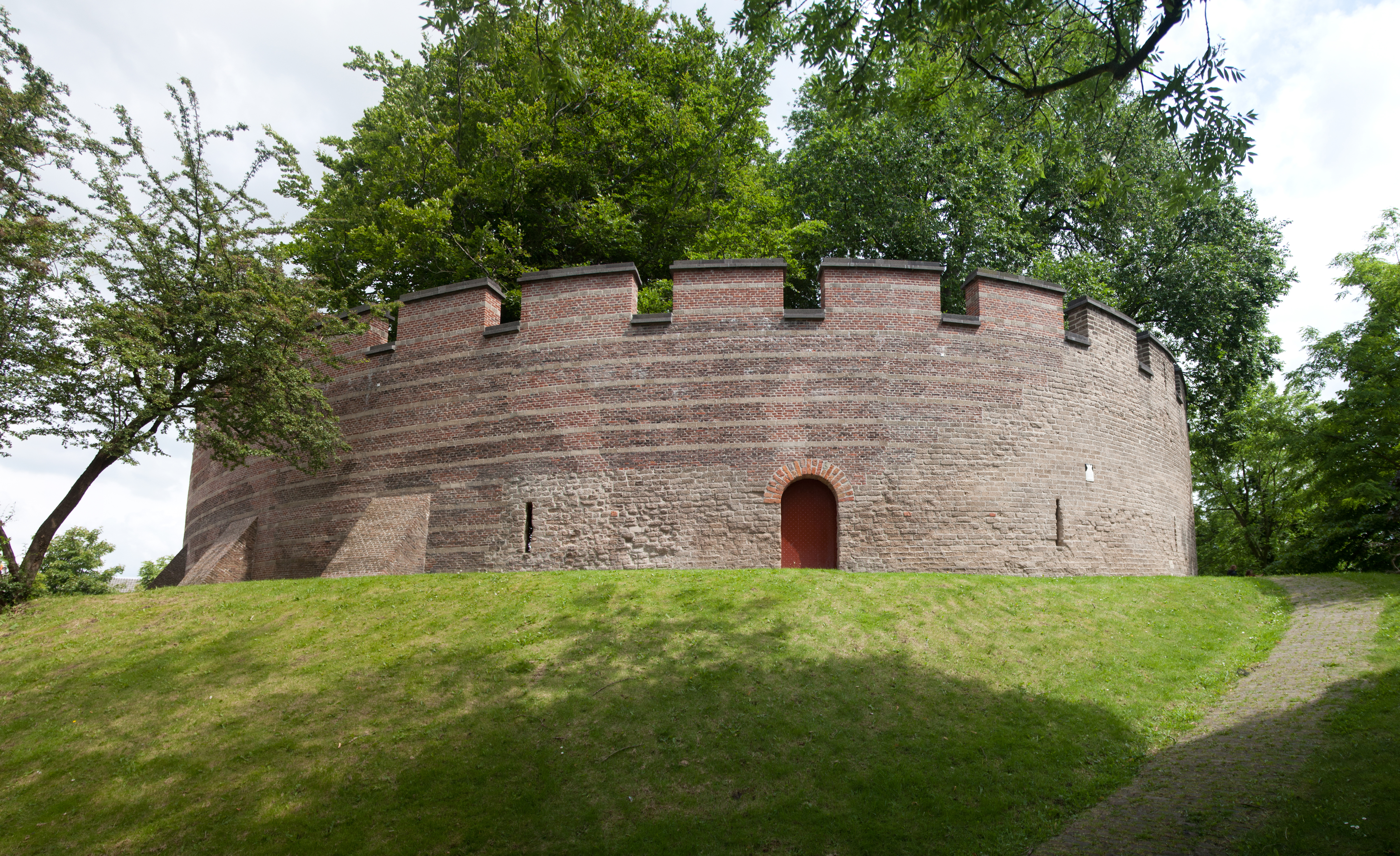
Burcht of Leiden

Philips' father Dirk II van Wassenaer (? - c. 1310) was one of the most influential nobles during the reign of Floris V, Count of Holland (1256-1296). He married Bertha van Kuik, daughter of Hendrik van Kuik (?-1319), burgrave of Leiden.

Philips' siblings were: Govaert van Wassenaer, married to Russende Storms; Willem van Wassenaer; Arent van Wassenaer, called Vanden Damme. Arent had four children: (another) Philips, Willem, Claas and Beatrix.

=== Career ===
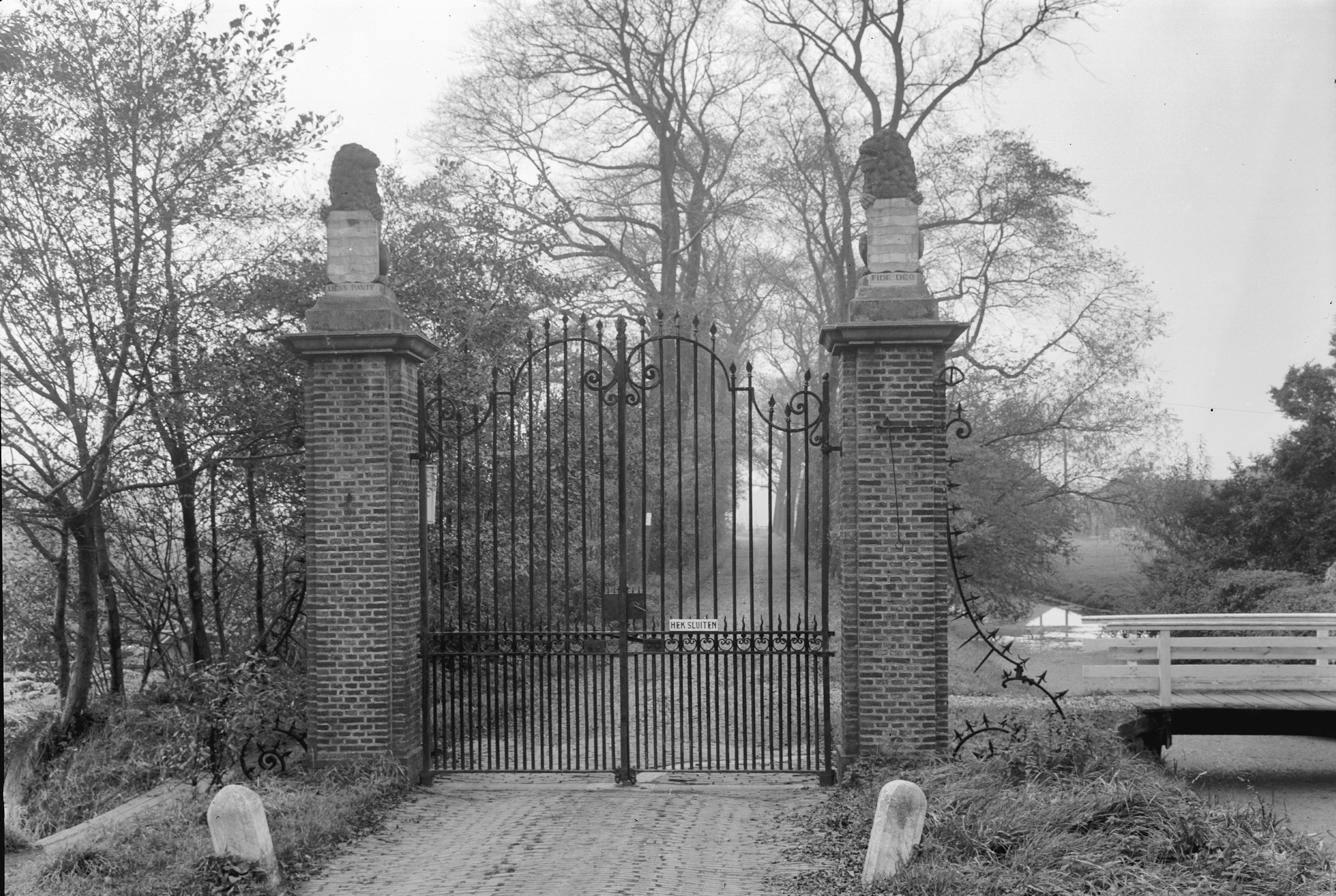
Gate of Ter Horst Castle

In 1287 Philip was chamberlain of Count Floris V. That year he was granted the tithe of Wassenaar, except for the usufruct or dower of Oda, widow of Willem van Teylingen. In May 1291 Philips was keeper of the seals of Count Floris V. At that time he was still a squire, and got granted the privilege that if he did not get a son, his oldest daughter could inherit his estate. If she also died, his other eldest daughter was allowed to inherit. A similar provision had been made for the estate of his father and mother in 1282. In June 1326 Philips was still a squire.

Philips first married Goedele van Benthem, daughter of Symon van Benthem. In 1319 she was still alive.

On 3 January 1326 Philips married Lijsbeth van der Dussen, daughter of Sir Jan van der Dussen. The marriage contract states that if he would get a son with Lijsbeth, he would succeed in all his fiefs. Which makes it clear that he did not have a surviving son with his former wife Goedele.

Philip's biggest success was that he became burgrave of Leiden in April 1339. This succession came about as follows: Burgrave Hendrik van Kuik (?-1319) had a son Dirk, a son Willem and a daughter Bertha, married to Philips' father. Dirk van Kuik succeeded as burgrave of Leiden. He married a young widow Justine (?-after 1377) in about 1322, but they had no children. In 1336 the old burgrave asked the count of Holland to manage his estate because he was incapable due to old age. In February 1338 the old burgrave died. By then his brother Willem was already dead. Philips thus became burgrave of Leiden due to his father's marriage with Bertha.

=== Residence ===
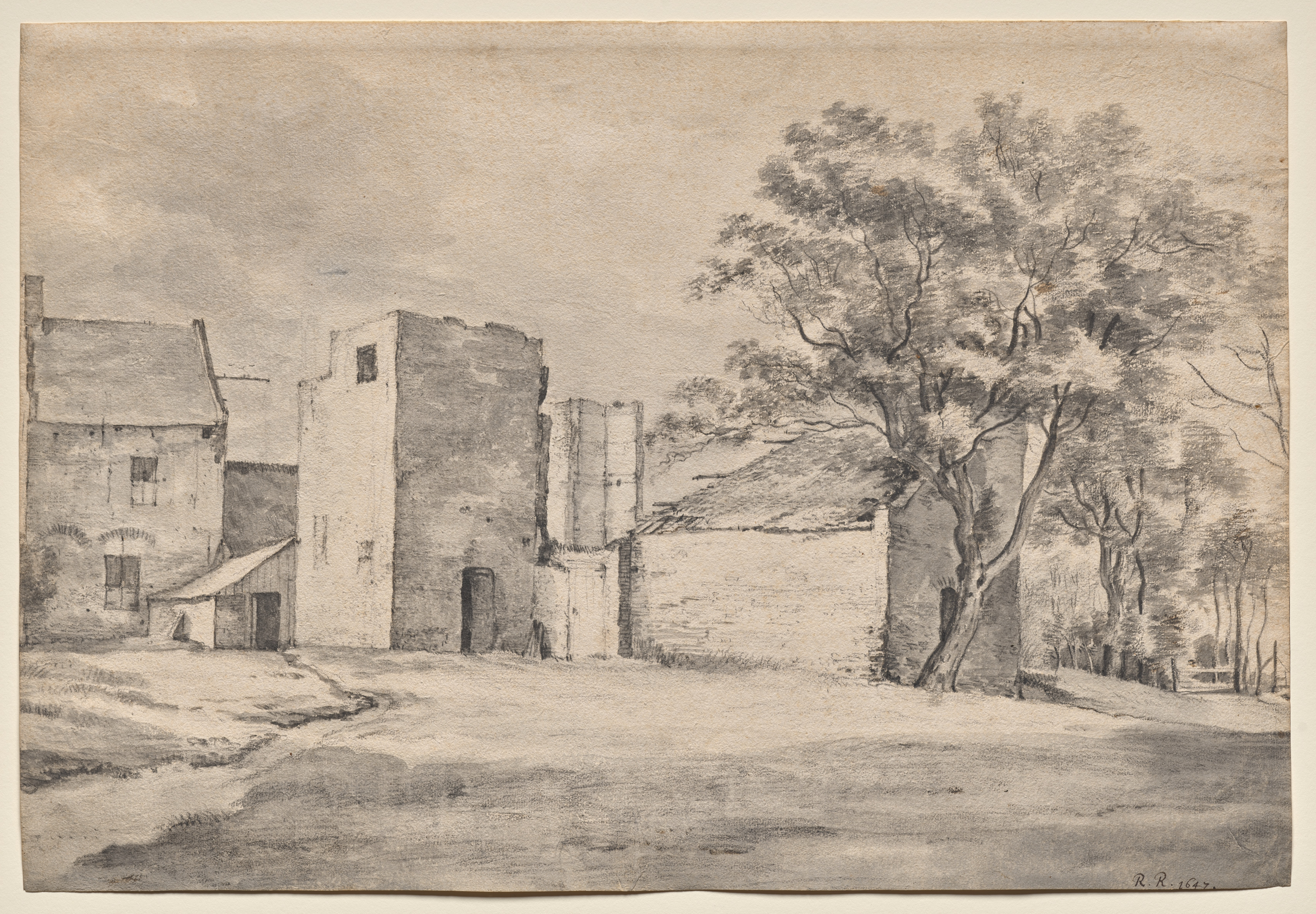
Ruins of 't Sant Castle in Katwijk late 17th century

Ter Horst Castle in Voorschoten was held in fief by Philips' father Dirk. In 1307 Dirk made Philips heir of Ter Horst Castle as part of a larger estate, and in 1309 Count William III did the same. That Philips actually resided there is known from the papers that he sealed there, e.g. in 1326.

Not that much is known about Ter Horst Castle. It was destroyed in 1393. Around 1635 Reinier Pauw (1591–1676) built a manor in its place. From 1863 to 1876 Prince Frederick of the Netherlands built a neo Gothic mansion on top of the existing foundations.

The office of burgrave of Leiden made Philips castellan of the burcht van Leiden. This was a castle which was always referred to as burcht, while other castles were generally called Huys. The exact reason is not that clear, but that the title burchgrave contains the word burcht, is no coincidence.

By the thirteenth century the castle had become less defendable, and unsuitable as a residence. However, the office of burgrave had become to include the lordship (ambachtsheerlijkheid) of Valckenburg and Katwijk. In 1340 Philips therefore took up residence at 't Zand Castle between Katwijk and Oegstgeest.

== Marriage and offspring ==
Philips married three times:

1. Goedele van Benthem, daughter of Symon van Benthem.
2. In 1326: Lijsbeth van der Dussen, daughter of Sir Jan van der Dussen.
3. Catharina Duyk

From Goedele he had:

- Heilwig van Wassenaer, married to Willem van Duvenvoorde

Philips furthermore had:

- Badeloch van Wassenaer, married to ?.
- Elisabeth van Wassenaer, married to Gijsbert Uytterlier.
- Dirk III van Wassenaer (c. 1325 - 1391)
- Hendrik van Wassenaer killed in the Battle of Othée in 1408 fighting at against Liège.

== Gallery ==
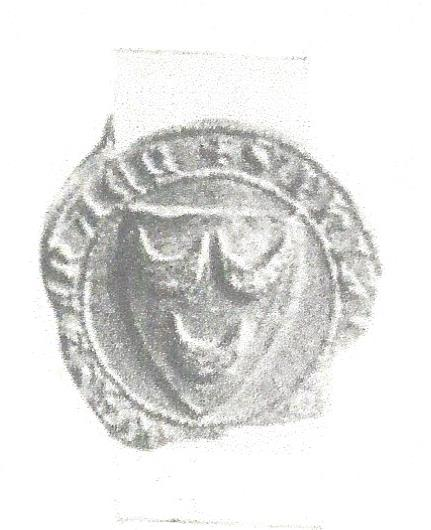
Seal of Philips van Wassenaer before he became burgrave of Leiden

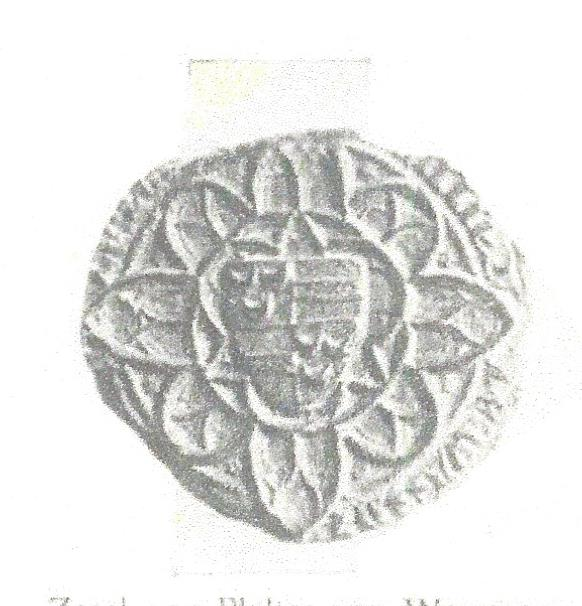
Seal of Philips van Wassenaer as burgrave of Leiden
