= Bourg =

Bourg or Le Bourg may refer to:

== Places ==
=== France ===
==== Bourg ====
- Bourg, Aisne, a former commune in France, now part of Bourg-et-Comin
- Bourg, Bas-Rhin, a former commune in Bas-Rhin, now part of Bourg-Bruche
- Bourg, Gironde, also known as Bourg-sur-Gironde
- Bourg, Haute-Marne
- Bourg, Maine-et-Loire, a former commune of Maine-et-Loire, now part of Soulaire-et-Bourg
- Bourg-Achard, in Eure (département)
- Bourg-Archambault, Vienne (département)
- Bourg-Argental, Loire (département)
- Bourg-Beaudouin, Eure (département)
- Bourg-Blanc, Finistère
- Bourg-Bruche, Bas-Rhin
- Bourg-Charente, Charente
- Bourg-de-Bigorre, Hautes-Pyrénées
- Bourg-de-Péage, Drôme
- Bourg-des-Comptes, Ille-et-Vilaine
- Bourg-de-Sirod, Jura (département)
- Bourg-des-Maisons, Dordogne (département)
- Bourg-de-Thizy, Rhône (département)
- Bourg-de-Visa, Tarn-et-Garonne
- Bourg-d'Oueil, Haute-Garonne
- Bourg-du-Bost, Dordogne (département)
- Bourg-en-Bresse, Ain
- Bourg-et-Comin, Aisne (département)
- Bourg-Fidèle, Ardennes (département)
- Bourg-la-Reine, Hauts-de-Seine
- Bourg-Lastic, Puy-de-Dôme
- Bourg-le-Comte, Saône-et-Loire
- Bourg-le-Roi, Sarthe
- Bourg-lès-Valence, Drôme
- Bourg-l'Évêque, Maine-et-Loire
- Bourg-Madame, Pyrénées-Orientales
- Bourg-Saint-Andéol, Ardèche
- Bourg-Saint-Bernard, Haute-Garonne
- Bourg-Saint-Christophe, Ain
- Bourg-Sainte-Marie, Haute-Marne
- Bourg-Saint-Maurice, Savoie (département)
- Bourg-sous-Châtelet, Territoire de Belfort

==== Le Bourg ====
- Le Bourg, Lot (département)
- Le Bourg-d'Hem, Creuse (département)
- Le Bourg-d'Iré, Maine-et-Loire
- Le Bourg-d'Oisans, Isère (département)
- Le Bourg-Dun, Seine-Maritime
- Le Bourg-Saint-Léonard, Orne

=== Switzerland ===
- Bourg-Saint-Pierre, Valais canton

=== United States ===
- Bourg, Louisiana

== People ==
- Anne Bourg (born 1987), Luxembourgish footballer
- Daniel de Bourg (born 1976), British singer, songwriter, dancer, actor and model
- Dominique Bourg (born 1953), French philosopher
- Frank Bourg (1890–1955), American bank teller
- Hervé de Bourg-Dieu (c.1080–1150), French Benedictine exegete
- Joseph-Mathurin Bourg (1744–1797), Roman Catholic Spiritan priest
- Lorna Bourg, American charity director and President of the Southern Mutual Help Association (SMHA)
- MacKenzie Bourg (born 1992), American singer-songwriter
- Tony Bourg (1912–1991), Luxembourgish author, linguist, literary scholar and critic
- Willy Bourg (1934–2003), Luxembourgish politician

== Other ==
- Côtes de Bourg, an Appellation d'origine contrôlée (AOC) for Bordeaux wine

== See also ==
=== Other French placenames which include Bourg ===
- Boussac-Bourg, Creuse (département)
- Cherbourg-Octeville
- Chaumont-le-Bourg, Puy-de-Dôme
- Fontaine-le-Bourg, Seine-Maritime
- Grand-Bourg, Guadeloupe
- Le Grand-Bourg, Creuse (département)
- Granges-le-Bourg, Haute-Saône
- Hornoy-le-Bourg, Somme (département)
- Lurcy-le-Bourg, Nièvre
- Magnac-Bourg, Haute-Vienne
- Noroy-le-Bourg, Haute-Saône
- Petit-Bourg, Guadeloupe
- Saint-Cyr-en-Bourg, Maine-et-Loire
- Saint-Léger-du-Bourg-Denis, Seine-Maritime
- Saint-Bonnet-le-Bourg, Puy-de-Dôme
- Saint-Denis-lès-Bourg, Ain
- Saint-Seurin-de-Bourg, Gironde
- Soulaire-et-Bourg, Maine-et-Loire
- Vieux-Bourg, Calvados
- Le Vieux-Bourg, Côtes-d'Armor

=== Similar words ===
- Bergh (disambiguation)
- Borg (disambiguation)
- Borgh (disambiguation)
- Burg (disambiguation)
- Burgh (disambiguation)
- Dubourg, surname
