= El Burgo (disambiguation) =

El Burgo is a town in Andalusia, Spain.

El Burgo may also refer to:

- El Burgo de Ebro, municipality in Aragon
- El Burgo de Osma, town in Castille
- El Burgo Ranero, municipality in the province of León
- Elburgo, the largest settlement in the municipality of Elburgo/Burgelu, in the Basque Country

== See also ==
- Burgo (disambiguation)
