= Dirk III van Wassenaer =

- Lord of Wassenaar
- Arms of Dirk III van Wassenaer
- Predecessor: Philips III van Wassenaer
- Successor: Philips IV van Wassenaer
- Born: c. 1325
- Died: 1391

Dirk III van Wassenaar (c. 1325 - 1391 or 92) was Heer van (Lord of) Wassenaar and burggraaf (burgrave) of Leiden.

== Life ==
=== Family ===
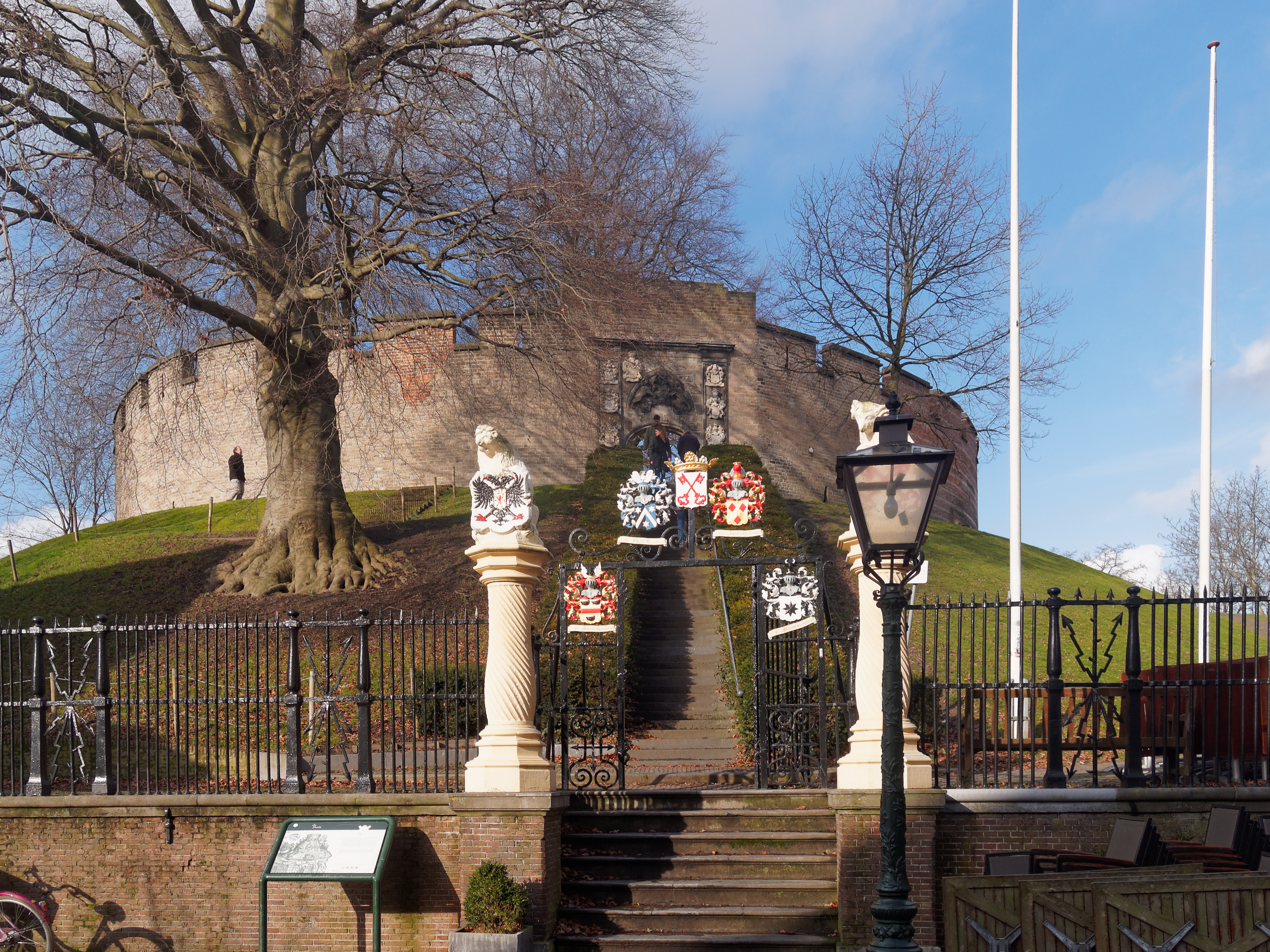
Burcht van Leiden

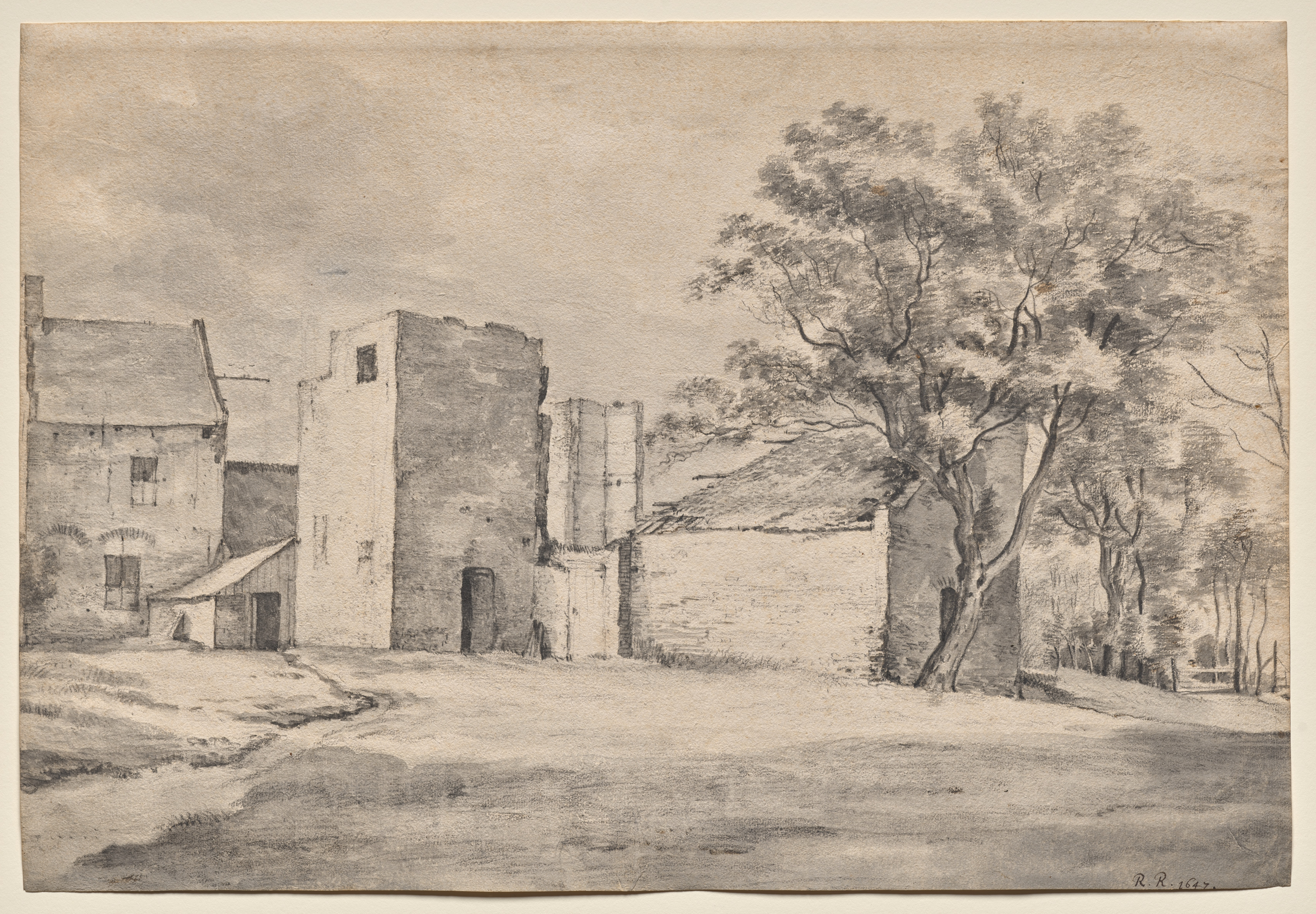
Ruins of 't Sant Castle

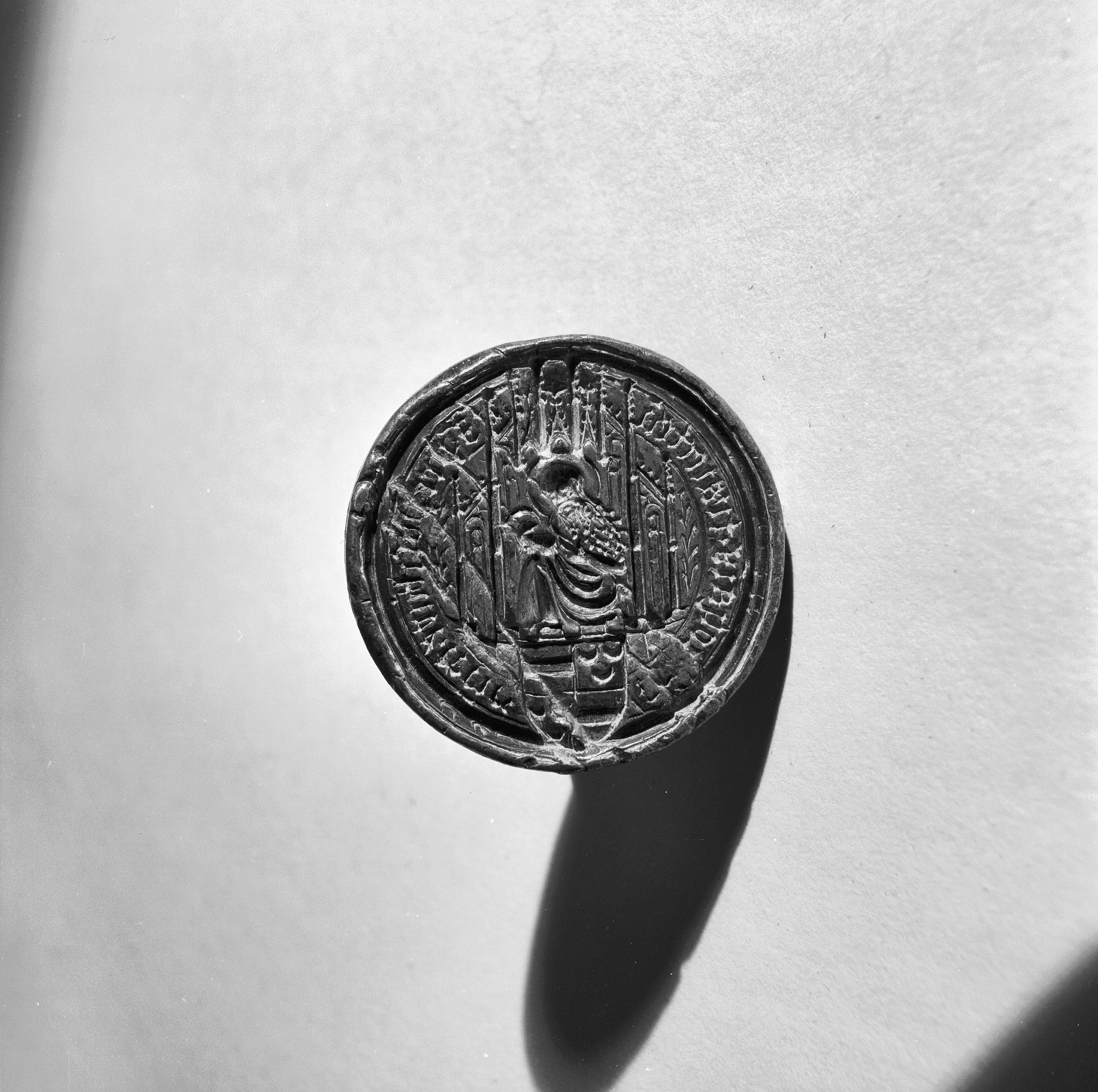
Arms of Dirk III van Wassenaar (RCE)

Dirk III van Wassenaer belonged to the main branch of the Van Wassenaer family. He was the son of Philips III van Wassenaer (1307- c. 1345) and Elisabeth van der Dussen. From his three marriages, Philips left Dirk with a half-sister Heylwig, married to Willem van Duvenvoorde, two other half-sisters, and a brother Hendrik. Philips had crowned his career by becoming Burgrave of Leiden in 1339.

=== Residence ===
It's tempting to assume that the Burgrave of Leiden lived in the well known ancient Burcht van Leiden, but this was not a habitable castle. Therefore, the burgraves generally resided somewhere else. In 1300 the Burgrave office became connected to the lordship (ambachtsheerlijkheid) of Valckenburg and Katwijk. In 1340 Philips took up residence at 't Zand Castle in Katwijk.

It's probable that after his father died, Dirk continued to live at 't Sant. In the late fourteenth century Dirk would build Paddenpoel Castle as his new residence.

=== Hook and Cod Wars ===
The Hook and Cod wars started in earnest in February 1351. At that time Dirk would have been about 25 years old. He is on the September 1350 list of members of the Hook Alliance. Here he is mentioned first in the list of squires that signed the alliance. The obvious reason is that he had not yet been made a knight. His office as burgrave of Leiden is explicitly mentioned.

It is not that clear what happened to Dirk III during the Hook and Cod Wars. He is not on the list of the enemies of the Cod Alliance, which dates either from 1350 or from 1351. In June 1352 he was on a list of nobles that would have to besiege the Hook stronghold Groot Poelgeest Castle in case Gerard of Poelgeest would not surrender to the count. Caution is required, because the reference is to the 'Burgrave of Leiden'. With 20 men he would have to deliver the largest number of soldiers for the possible siege.

It therefore seems that Dirk III might have been a reluctant Hook, or chose to come to terms early. In June 1355 Dirk van Wassenaer, Burgrave of Leiden declared that the citizens of Delft did not have to pay toll in his territories. Nevertheless, in September 1357 the count declared that Dirk van Wassenaer had been restored in all rights as burgrave of Leiden. It therefore seems that Dirk did not get away without punishment.

=== Struggle with Leiden ===
During his office as burgrave, Dirk would struggle with the city over all kinds of privileges. In 1315 a charter instituted 8 schepenen and a schout for the city government. In 1351 the city chose four councilors to govern the city. These four would later be called mayors. It is obvious that in the year 1351 the city profited from the political situation. In November 1355 Dirk again lost a lot a whole bunch of rights to the city, which had the Cod count on its side.

One of the causes for the serious arguments and eternal squabbles was in geography. In time, the Burcht van Leiden was absorbed into the city. The burgraves then insisted on their authority over that part of the city, which used to be their land. On the contrary, the city government understandably refused to acknowledge legal exceptions within the city limits.

The position of Dirk III became better after count William V of Holland was locked up because of insanity. In February 1358 William's younger brother Albert of Bavaria became regent of Holland, Zeeland and Hainaut. Within a year Albert was fighting against the Cod lords, and the city of Delft. However, the long term trend of the rising cities could not be undone by incidental success. The struggle between the city and the burgraves would result in a total defeat for the latter in 1420.

=== Dies before the murder of Aleid van Poelgeest (1392) ===
Dirk began to be replaced by his son Philip from about 1380. On 5 May 1392 Philips IV became the legal successor to his deceased father. In September 1392 Filips became implicated in the murder of Aleid van Poelgeest.

== Marriage and offspring ==
Dirk III married Machteld Oem, daughter of Gilles Oem, Lord of Barendrecht and had:

- Philips IV van Wassenaer
- Gerrit van Wassenaer
- Willem van Wassenaer
- Dirk IV van Wassenaer
