= DeBerg =

DeBerg is a surname. Notable people with the surname include:

- Keren DeBerg, American singer-songwriter
- Steve DeBerg (born 1954), American football player

== See also ==
- de Burgh, surname
- Dubourg, surname
- Bourg (disambiguation)
