= Ilja Bergh =

Danish pianist and composer (1927-2015)

- Born: 22 January 1927; Berlin, Germany
- Died: 5 September 2015 (aged 88); Hvidovre, Denmark
- Occupations: Pianist and composer

Ilja Bergh (22 January 1927 – 5 September 2015) was a Danish pianist and composer.

His father was a Jewish singing teacher and his mother was a Russian-born painter. His grandfather was the composer Rudolph Sophus Bergh and his great-grandfather physician and zoologist Rudolph Bergh.

Ilja Bergh led a colorful and turbulent life. His childhood took him from Berlin to Riga and Kiev, and finally to Copenhagen. He received his first piano lessons in Kiev 1935–1937. After World War II, he was admitted to the Royal Danish Academy of Music, but was thrown out due to obstinance. Later he was admitted again and received his diploma in 1957.

He died on 5 September 2015.
