= Borve =

Borve may refer to places otherwise known as "Borgh":

Villages in Scotland:

- Borve, Barra
- Borve, Harris
- Borve, Lewis
- Borve, Skye
- Borve, North Uist

Castles in Scotland:

- Borve Castle, Benbecula
- Borve Castle, Sutherland

== See also ==
- Borge (disambiguation)
