= Borve, Harris =

Coordinates: 57.843°N 7.001°W

Borve: Scottish Gaelic: Na Buirgh
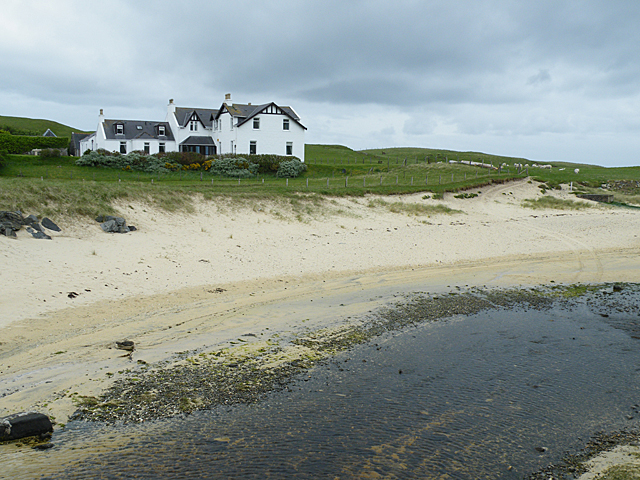
- Borve House, standing on the machair above the Allt Bhuirgh

- Location within the Outer Hebrides
- Language: Scottish Gaelic; English
- OS grid reference: NG032946
- Civil parish: Harris
- Council area: Na h-Eileanan Siar
- Lieutenancy area: Western Isles
- Country: Scotland
- Sovereign state: United Kingdom
- Post town: ISLE OF HARRIS
- Postcode district: HS3
- Dialling code: 01859
- Police: Scotland
- Fire: Scottish
- Ambulance: Scottish
- UK Parliament: Na h-Eileanan an Iar
- Scottish Parliament: Na h-Eileanan an Iar

Borve (Scottish Gaelic: Na Buirgh) is a village in Harris in the Outer Hebrides, Scotland. Borve is also within the parish of Harris, and is on the A859.
