= Bourg-d'Oueil =

- Commune
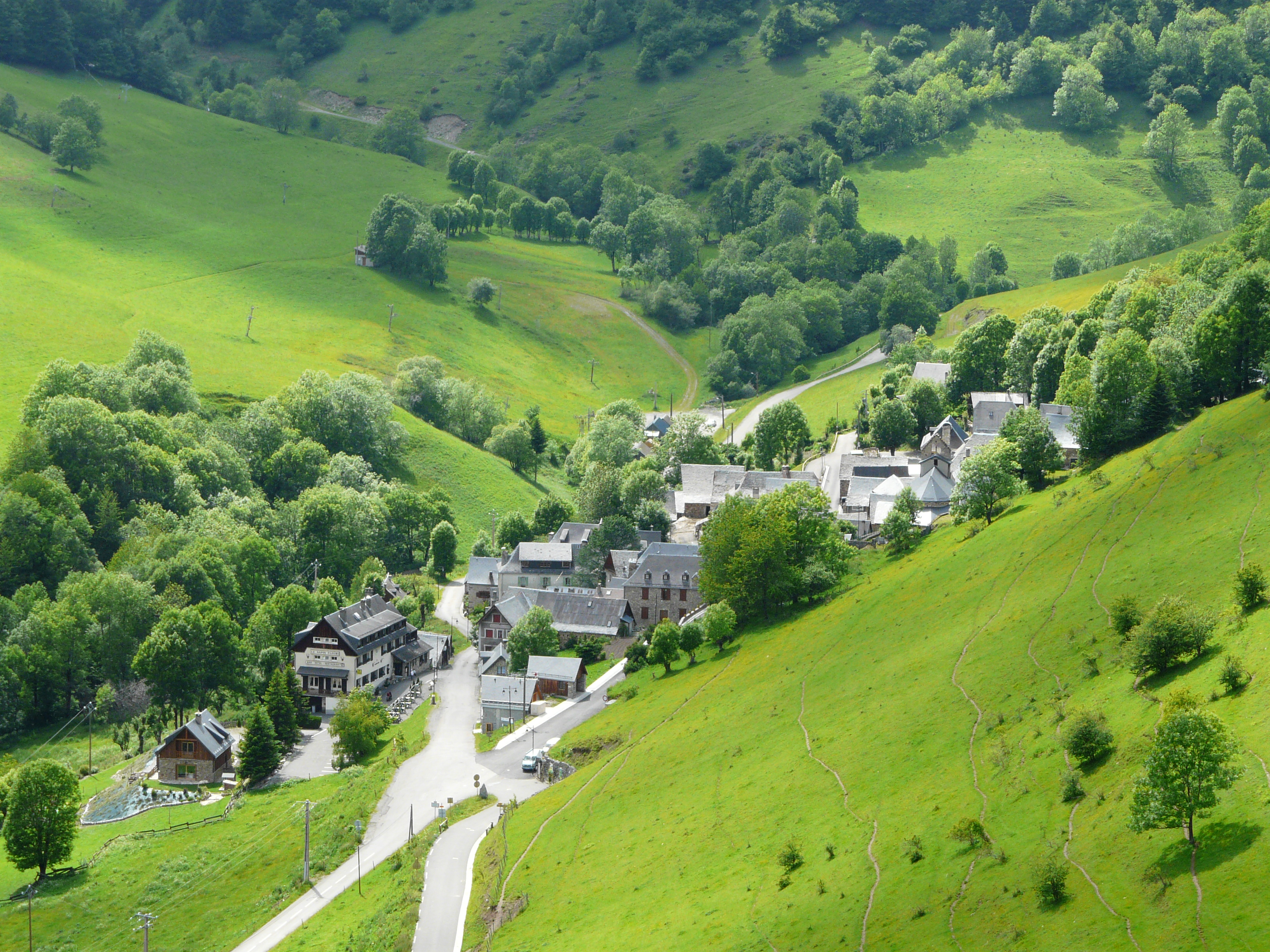
- An aerial view of Bourg-d'Oueil
- Location of Bourg-d'Oueil
- Location within France Location within Occitanie
- Coordinates: 42°51′37″N 0°29′55″E
- Country: France
- Region: Occitania
- Department: Haute-Garonne
- Arrondissement: Saint-Gaudens
- Canton: Bagnères-de-Luchon
- Intercommunality: Pyrénées Haut-Garonnaises

Government
  - Mayor (2020–2026): Henri Jamme
- Area^{1}: 9.52 km^{2} (3.68 sq mi)
- Elevation: 1,339 m (4,393 ft)
- Highest elevation: 2,150 m (7,050 ft)
- Lowest elevation: 1,274 m (4,180 ft)
- Population (2023): 14
  - Density: 1.5/km^{2} (3.8/sq mi)
- Time zone: UTC+01:00 (CET)
  - Summer (DST): UTC+02:00 (CEST)
- INSEE/Postal code: 31081 /31110
- ^{1} French Land Register data, which excludes lakes, ponds, glaciers > 1 km^{2} (0.386 sq mi or 247 acres) and river estuaries.

Bourg-d'Oueil (French pronunciation: [buʁ dwɛj]; Occitan: Borg de Guelh) is a commune in the Haute-Garonne department in southwestern France.

== Population ==
Historical population
| Year | Pop. | ±% p.a. |
|---|---|---|
| 1968 | 21 | — |
| 1975 | 18 | −2.18% |
| 1982 | 21 | +2.23% |
| 1990 | 19 | −1.24% |
| 1999 | 10 | −6.88% |
| 2007 | 11 | +1.20% |
| 2012 | 9 | −3.93% |
| 2017 | 6 | −7.79% |
| 2023 | 14 | +15.17% |
Source: INSEE

== See also ==
- Communes of the Haute-Garonne department
