= Noroy-le-Bourg =

- Commune
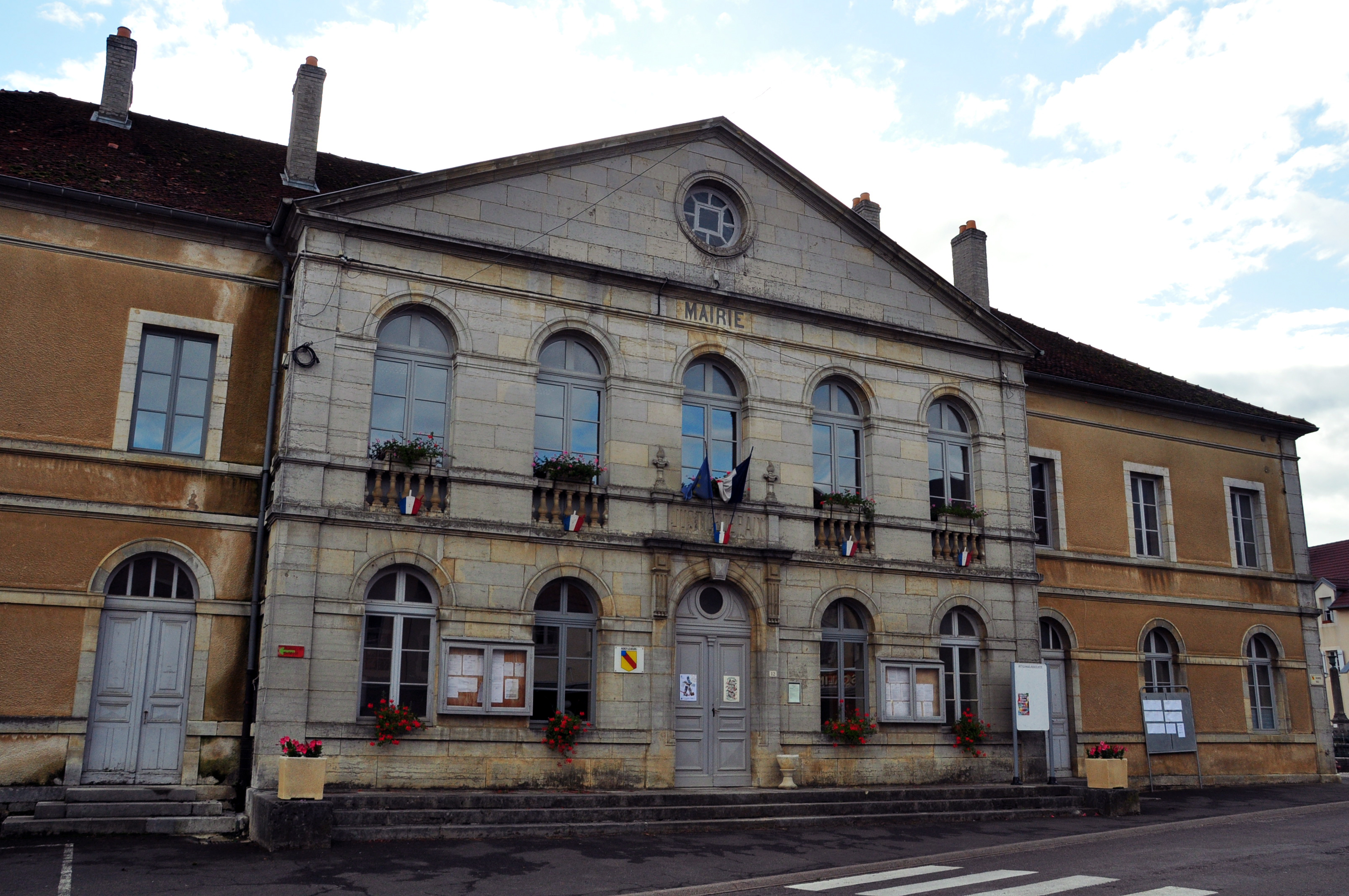
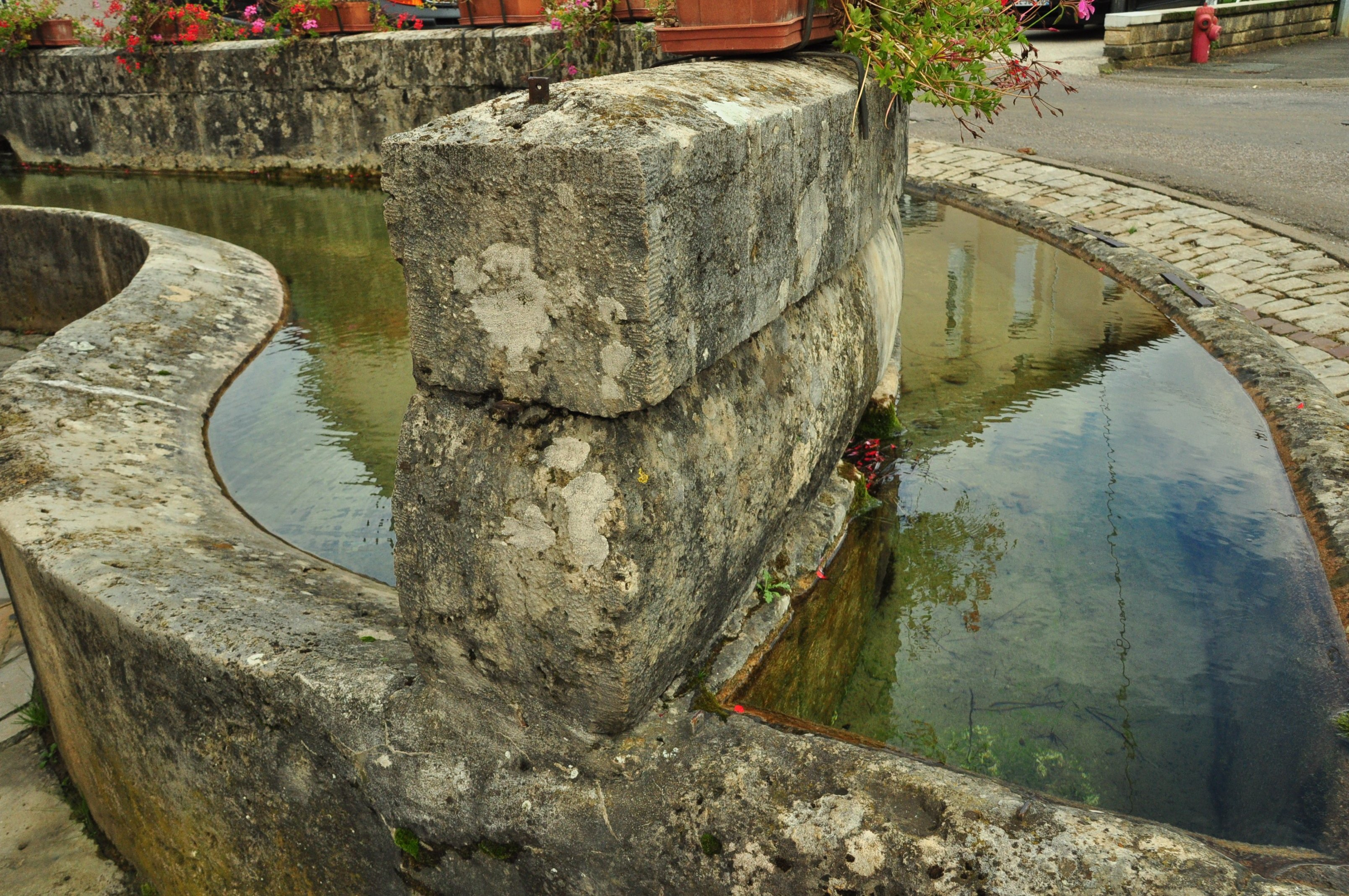
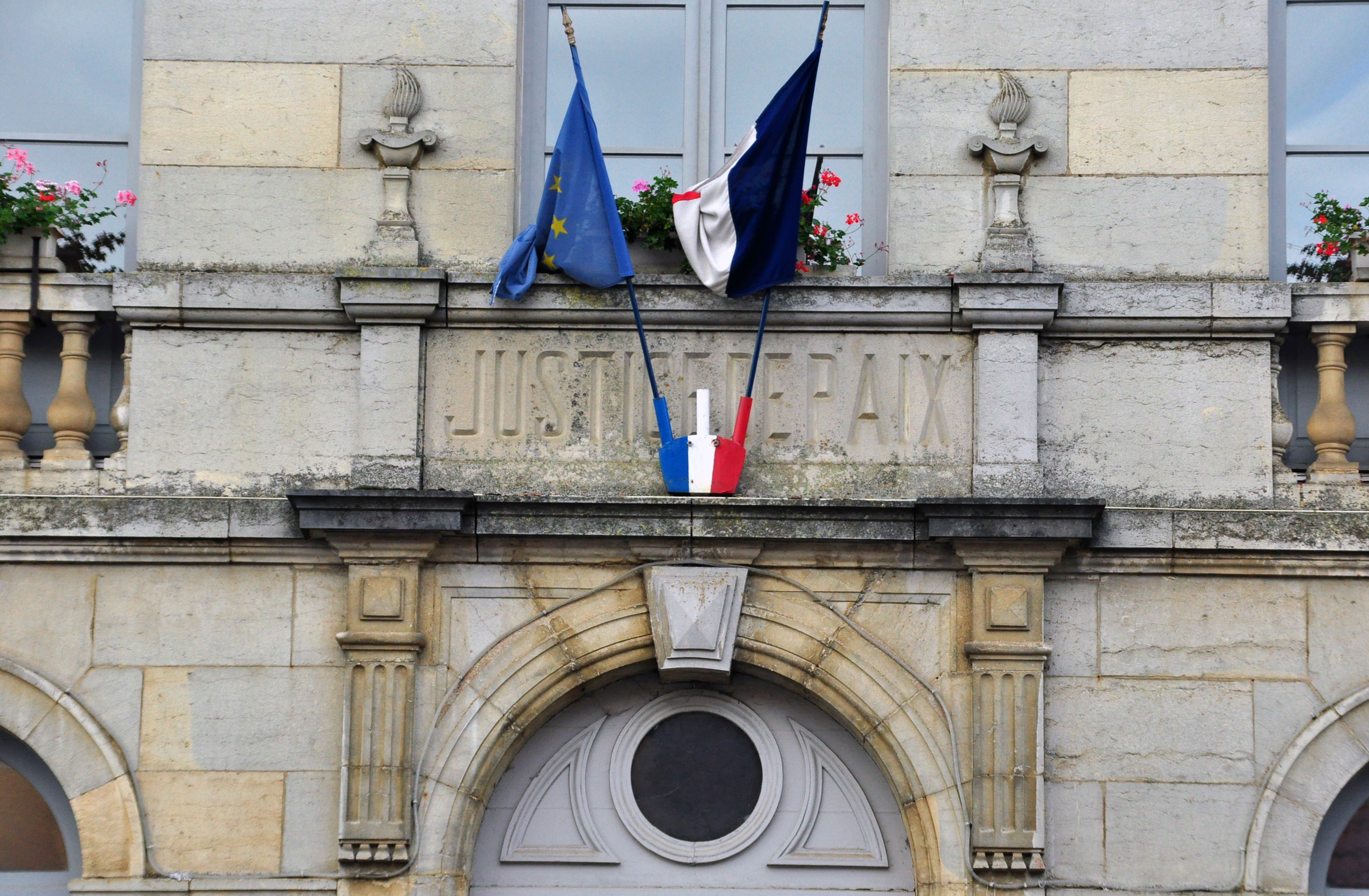
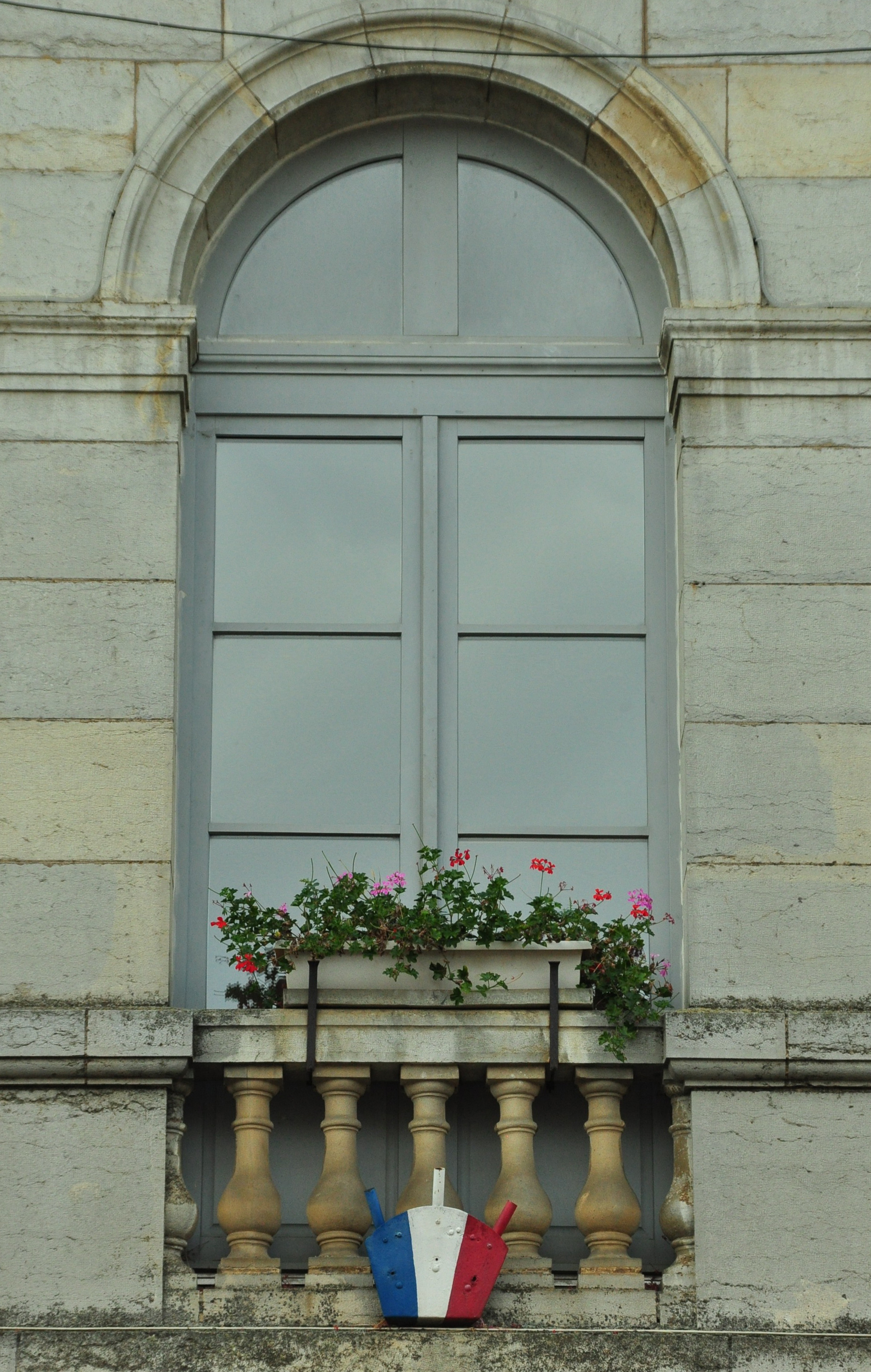
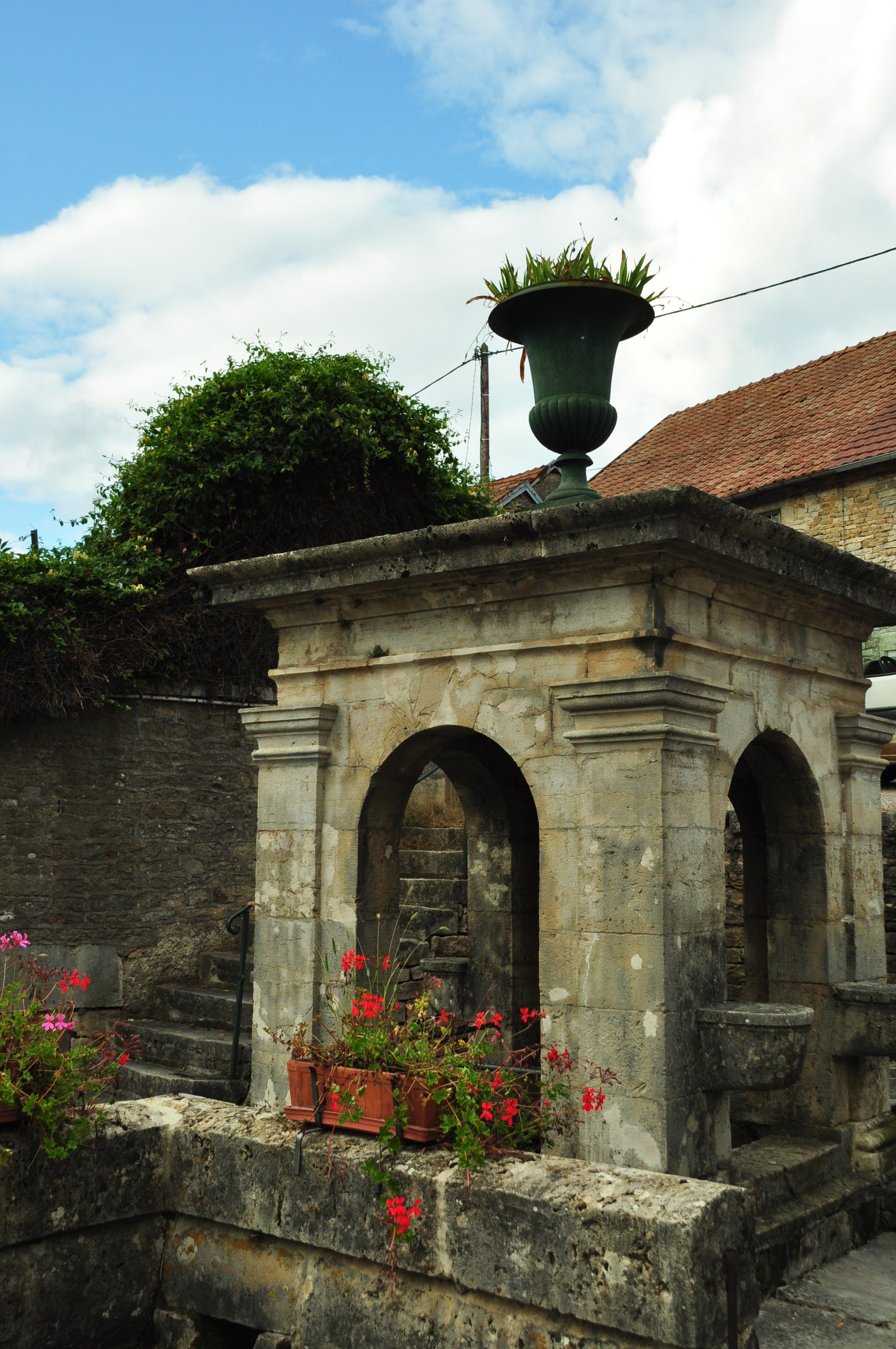
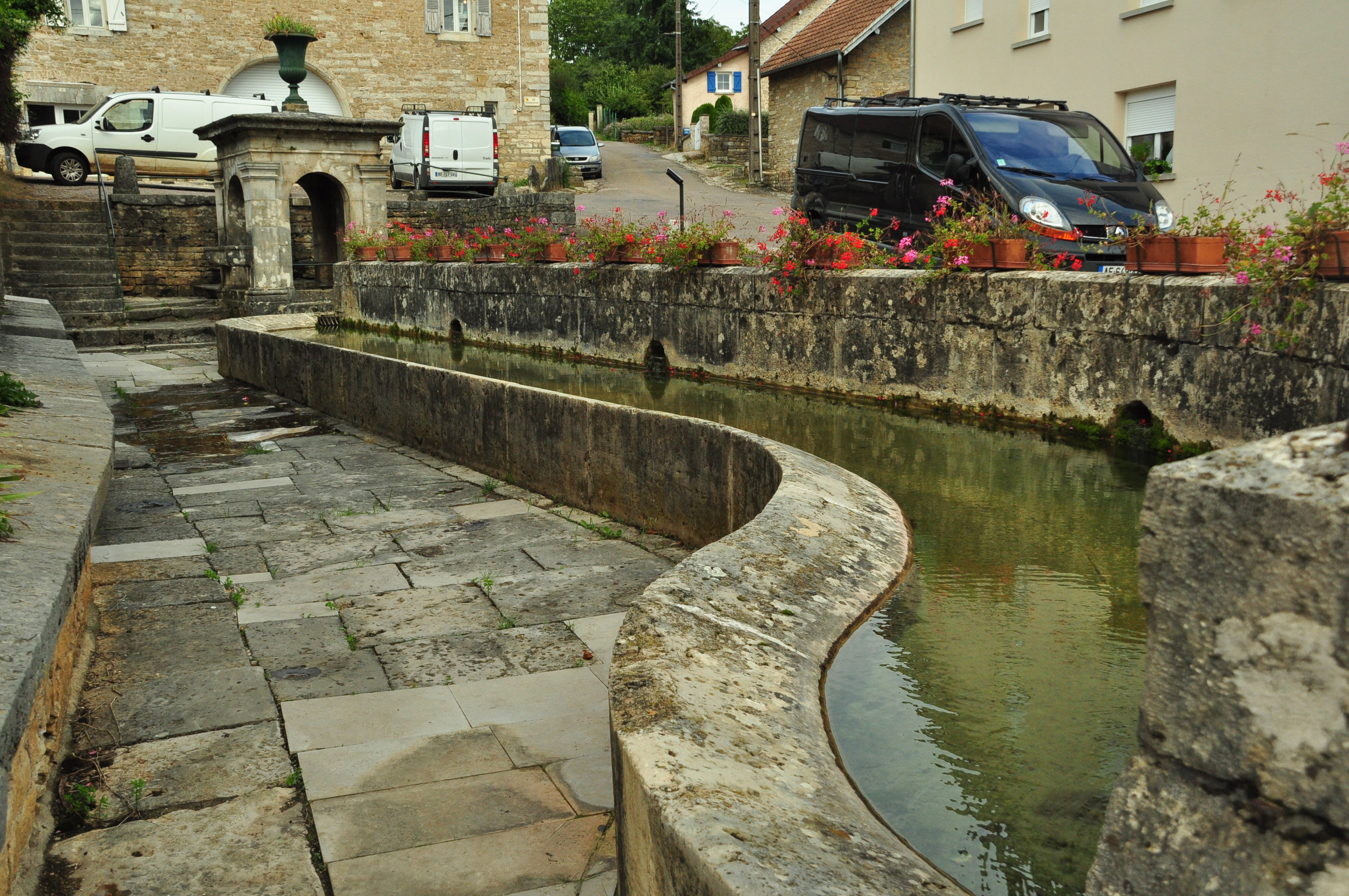

- Coat of arms
- Location of Noroy-le-Bourg
- Location within France Location within Bourgogne-Franche-Comté
- Coordinates: 47°36′56″N 6°18′22″E
- Country: France
- Region: Bourgogne-Franche-Comté
- Department: Haute-Saône
- Arrondissement: Vesoul
- Canton: Villersexel

Government
  - Mayor (2020–2026): Jean Desmartin
- Area^{1}: 31.78 km^{2} (12.27 sq mi)
- Highest elevation: 447 m (1,467 ft)
- Lowest elevation: 280 m (920 ft)
- Population (2023): 506
  - Density: 15.9/km^{2} (41.2/sq mi)
- Time zone: UTC+01:00 (CET)
  - Summer (DST): UTC+02:00 (CEST)
- INSEE/Postal code: 70390 /70000
- ^{1} French Land Register data, which excludes lakes, ponds, glaciers > 1 km^{2} (0.386 sq mi or 247 acres) and river estuaries.

Noroy-le-Bourg (French pronunciation: [nɔʁwa lə buʁ]) is a commune in the Haute-Saône department in the region of Bourgogne-Franche-Comté in eastern France.

== See also ==
- Communes of the Haute-Saône department
