= Borg Island =

Island of Kemp Land, Antarctica

- Location within Antarctica

Geography
- Location: Antarctica
- Coordinates: 66°58′S 57°35′E
- Length: 1.9 km (1.18 mi)

Administration
- Administered under the Antarctic Treaty System

Demographics
- Population: Uninhabited

Borg Island (66°58′S 57°35′E) is an island 1.9 kilometres (1 nmi) long in the eastern part of the Øygarden Group. It was mapped by Norwegian cartographers from aerial photos taken by the Lars Christensen Expedition, 1936–37, and called by them "Borgoy" (castle island).

== See also ==
- List of Antarctic and sub-Antarctic islands
