= Burgo =

Burgo, de Burgo or del Burgo may refer to:

== People ==
- House of Burgh (Latin: de Burgo), an Anglo-Norman and Hiberno-Norman dynasty founded in 1193
- De Burgo baronets, a title in the Baronetage of Ireland
- Bill Burgo (1919–1988), American Major League Baseball player in 1943 and 1944
- Dominic de Burgo (1629–1704), Roman Catholic Bishop of Elphin
- Roland de Burgo (died 1589), Roman Catholic and Anglican Bishop of Clonfert
- Thomas Burke (bishop) or Thomas de Burgo (c. 1709–1776), Irish Dominican and Roman Catholic Bishop of Ossory
- Jaime del Burgo (born 1942), Spanish lawyer, politician and historian
- Rufino Segovia del Burgo (born 1985), Spanish footballer
- Burgo Partridge (1935–1963), English author and member of the Bloomsbury Group
- Burgo Fitzgerald, a character in the novel Can You Forgive Her?, by Anthony Trollope

== Places ==
- Burgo de Osma-Ciudad de Osma, third-largest municipality in Soria, Castile and León, Spain

== Buildings ==
- Burgo de Osma Cathedral, Roman Catholic church located in El Burgo de Osma, Spain
- Pellicer-De Burgo House, historic house located at 53 St George Street in St Augustine, Florida

== Food ==
- Steak de Burgo, steak dish and regional specialty in the Midwest, Des Moines, Iowa, United States
- Burgo (food), a folded rice pancake, specialty of Palembang, Indonesia

== Publications ==
- Book of the de Burgos or Book of the Burkes, late 16th-century Gaelic illuminated manuscript held by the Library of Trinity College, Dublin

== See also ==
- Burgos (disambiguation)
- El Burgo (disambiguation)
- de Burgh
- Burke (disambiguation)
