= Lorna Bourg =

American charity director

Lorna Bourg (English: /bɜːr/; BER) is an American charity director who is President and Executive Director of the Southern Mutual Help Association (SMHA).

== Biography ==
She graduated from St. Joseph's Academy and received a Master's degree in Psychology from the University of Louisiana at Lafayette, from Harvard University's JFK School of Government in the Sr. Executive's Program, and studied at University of Massachusetts Amherst as well as the University of Wisconsin's Extension Program Community Development.

Bourg co-founded the Southern Mutual Help Association in 1969.

She designed and implemented the Building Rural Communities Program for Economic Development. She designed, and implemented a loan fund for low-income rural homeowners. In 1997, she helped design and implement a pilot programs of the Rural Home Loan Partnership.

== Awards ==
- 1992 MacArthur Fellows Program
- Fannie Mae Foundation James A. Johnson Fellow
