= Richard de Burgh =

Richard de Burgh may refer to:

- Richard Mor de Burgh (c. 1194–1242), eldest son of William de Burgh
- Richard Óg de Burgh, 2nd Earl of Ulster (1259–1326), Irish nobleman
- Richard Burke, 4th Earl of Clanricarde (1572–1635), Irish nobleman
- Richard Burke, 8th Earl of Clanricarde (d.1704), Irish nobleman
- Risdeárd de Burca, 6th Mac William Íochtar (died 1473), Irish chieftain and noble
