= Dubourg =

Dubourg or du Bourg is a French surname. Notable people with the name include:

- Anne du Bourg (1521–1559), French lawyer
- Auguste-René-Marie Dubourg (1842–1921), French cardinal of the Roman Catholic Church
- Bernard Dubourg (1945–1992), French poet, professor of philosophy, translator and Hebrew scholar
- Colonel du Bourg, false name of the man who set up the 1814 London stock exchange fraud
- Éléonor Marie du Maine du Bourg (1655–1739), French nobleman and general
- Emmanuel Dubourg (born 1958), Canadian politician, accountant and teacher
- George Dubourg (1799–1882), British writer on the violin and song writer
- Jacques Barbeu-Dubourg (1709–1779), French botanist and translator
- Jean-Baptiste Dubourg (born 1987), French racing driver
- Jean-Baptiste Miroudot du Bourg (1722–1798), French bishop
- Louis Fabricius Dubourg (1693–1775), Dutch painter and engraver
- Louis-Guillaume-Valentin Dubourg (1766–1833), French missionary bishop
- Matthew Dubourg (1707–1767), British composer, violinist and concert-master
- Victoria Dubourg (1840–1926), French painter

== See also ==
- Bishop DuBourg High School, a private Roman Catholic school in St. Louis, Missouri, US
- Bourg (disambiguation)
- Burgh (disambiguation)
