= Bourg-Bruche =

- Commune
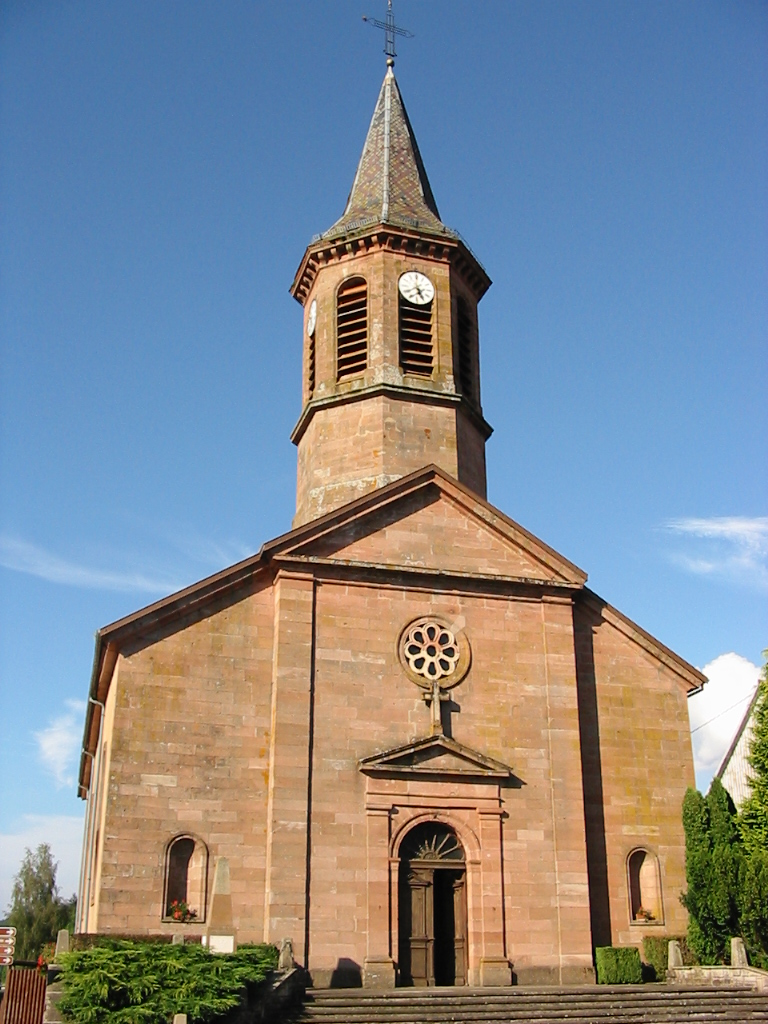
- The church in Bourg-Bruche

- Coat of arms
- Location of Bourg-Bruche
- Location within France Location within Grand Est
- Coordinates: 48°21′24″N 7°08′19″E
- Country: France
- Region: Grand Est
- Department: Bas-Rhin
- Arrondissement: Molsheim
- Canton: Mutzig

Government
  - Mayor (2020–2026): Marc Dellenbach
- Area^{1}: 15.02 km^{2} (5.80 sq mi)
- Highest elevation: 825 m (2,707 ft)
- Lowest elevation: 448 m (1,470 ft)
- Population (2023): 378
  - Density: 25.2/km^{2} (65.2/sq mi)
- Time zone: UTC+01:00 (CET)
  - Summer (DST): UTC+02:00 (CEST)
- INSEE/Postal code: 67059 /67420
- ^{1} French Land Register data, which excludes lakes, ponds, glaciers > 1 km^{2} (0.386 sq mi or 247 acres) and river estuaries.

Bourg-Bruche (French pronunciation: [buʁ bʁyʃ]; German: Breuscheburg or Burg-Breusch) is a commune in the Bas-Rhin department in Grand Est in north-eastern France.

== See also ==
- Communes of the Bas-Rhin department
