= John Burgh =

John Burgh may refer to:

- John Burgh I (fl. 1399), MP for Bodmin in 1399
- John Burgh II (died 1434), MP for Surrey 1413–1416
- John Burgh III (died 1436), MP for Rutland 1413–1415 and Leicestershire 1421 and 1433
- John Burgh (MP for Brackley), see Brackley (UK Parliament constituency)
- John Burgh (MP for Wallingford), see Wallingford (UK Parliament constituency)
- Sir John Burgh (officer) (1562–1594), English military and naval commander
- Sir John Burgh (civil servant) (1925–2013), British civil servant and president of Trinity College, Oxford

== See also ==
- John de Burgh (disambiguation)
- John Borough, Garter Principal King of Arms 1633-43
