= John de Burgh =

John de Burgh may refer to:

- John de Burgh, son of Hubert de Burgh and son in law of William de Lanvallei
- John de Burgh (died 1313) (1286–1313), Irish heir apparent to the Earldom of Ulster
- John de Burgh, 13th Earl of Clanricarde (1744–1808), Irish nobleman, politician and cricketer
- John Smith de Burgh, 11th Earl of Clanricarde (1720–1782), Irish peer
- John de Burgh (bishop) (1590–1667), Roman Catholic archbishop of Tuam\

== See also ==
- John Burgh (disambiguation)
