= George Dubourg =

British writer

George Dubourg (1799 – 17 April 1882), was an English writer on the violin and a songwriter.

Dubourg was the grandson of violinist Matthew Dubourg. In 1836, George Dubourg published The Violin, being an Account of that leading Instrument and its most eminent Professors, &c., a work that was frequently reprinted. He was also a songwriter; his best known song was John Parry's "Wanted a Governess". During most of his life, Dubourg contributed articles to newspapers, especially in Brighton, England, where he lived for several years.

Dubourg later settled in Maidenhead, Berkshire, where he died on 17 April 1882.
