= El Burgo de Ebro =

- municipality
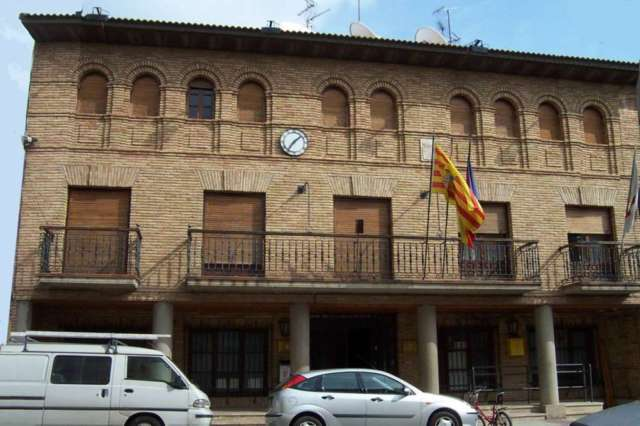

- Flag Coat of arms

- Location within Aragon Location within Spain Location within Europe
- Country: Spain
- Autonomous community: Aragon
- Province: Zaragoza

Area
  - Total: 24 km^{2} (9.3 sq mi)
- Elevation: 183 m (600 ft)

Population (2025-01-01)
  - Total: 2,750
  - Density: 110/km^{2} (300/sq mi)
- Time zone: UTC+1 (CET)
  - Summer (DST): UTC+2 (CEST)

El Burgo de Ebro is a municipality located in the province of Zaragoza, Aragon, Spain. According to the 2004 census (INE), the municipality has a population of 1,797 inhabitants.

== See also ==
- List of municipalities in Zaragoza
