= Elizabeth de Burgh (disambiguation) =

Elizabeth de Burgh may refer to:

- Elizabeth de Burgh (c. 1289–1327), queen of Scotland, wife of Robert the Bruce
- Elizabeth de Clare (1295–1360), founder of Clare College, sister-in-law of Queen Elizabeth de Burgh
- Elizabeth de Burgh, 4th Countess of Ulster (1332–1363) granddaughter of Elizabeth de Clare and grand-niece of Queen Elizabeth de Burgh
