= Thomas Burgh (priest) =

Irish cleric and Dean of Cloyne (1786–1845)

The Very Reverend Thomas Burgh
- Church: Church of Ireland
- Diocese: Cork, Cloyne and Ross
- Elected: Dean of Cloyne
- In office: 1823–1845
- Predecessor: Alexander Arbuthnot
- Successor: Hervey de Montmorency

Personal details
- Born: Thomas John Burgh; 6 May 1786 County Kildare, Ireland
- Died: 4 September 1845 (aged 59) Naas, County Kildare, Ireland
- Education: Trinity College, Dublin

Thomas John Burgh (6 May 1786 – 4 September 1845) was an Irish cleric who was Dean of Cloyne from 1823 until his death on 4 September 1845.

Burgh was born in County Kildare and was educated at Trinity College, Dublin. After a curacy in Letterkenny, he served incumbencies at Kilbixy and Ballinrobe. He died at Naas in 1845.
