= Rudolph Sophus Bergh =

Danish composer and zoologist (1859–1924)

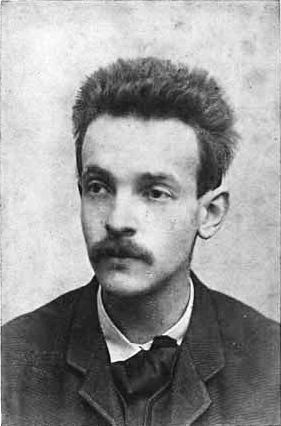
Rudolph Sophus Bergh

Rudolph Sophus Bergh (22 September 1859 – 7 December 1924) was a Danish composer and zoologist. He was the son of physician and zoologist Rudolph Bergh. He received his general education at the Metropolitanskolen and then studied music at the Royal Danish Academy of Music and zoology at the University of Copenhagen. He later taught histology and embryology at the university and published two books in his field: Forelæsninger over den almindelige Udviklingshistorie (1887) and Forelæsninger over den dyriske Celle (1892). In 1898 he was appointed a member of the Royal Danish Academy of Sciences and Letters. In 1903 he abandoned his science career and moved to Germany to focus solely on his work as a composer. After World War I he returned to his native country to teach at the Royal Danish Academy of Music.
