= Borg (disambiguation) =

The Borg is a fictional alien faction from the Star Trek franchise.

Borg may also refer to:

== People ==
- Borg (surname), list of people with the surname
- Lawrence Springborg, Australian politician also known as "The Borg"

== Places ==
=== Antarctica ===
- Borg Massif, a massif along the northwest side of the Penck Trough in Queen Maud Land
- Borg Mountain, a mountain standing at the northern end of Borg Massif in Queen Maud Land
- Borg Island, an island in the eastern part of the Øygarden Group

=== Iceland ===
- Borg or Borg á Mýrum, an ancient farm and church estate due west of Borgarnes

=== Germany ===
- Borg, Saarland, a village in the municipality of Perl in Saarland

=== Greenland ===
- Borgjokel, a glacier in Queen Louise Land
- Borgtinderne, a mountain range in King Christian IX Land

=== Norway ===
- Borg, Vestvågøy, a village in Vestvågøy municipality in Nordland county
- Borg, former name of the city Sarpsborg in Østfold county
- Diocese of Borg, a geographical diocese of the Church of Norway

=== Egypt ===
- Borg El Arab, an industrial city in the governorate of Alexandria

== Companies ==
- Borg Bryggerier, a Norwegian brewery
- BorgWarner, an automotive supply company
- BorgBuss, a Norwegian bus company

== Fiction ==
- The Borg, a Dell Comics character, archenemy tribe of the Gairns, of whom Naza, Stone Age Warrior is a hero
- Cyrus Borg, a character in Ninjago
- Isak Borg, the protagonist of Ingmar Bergman's 1957 film Wild Strawberries
- Jarl Borg, a character in the TV series Vikings, played by Thorbjørn Harr
- Various machines in the Emma Clayton novels The Roar (2009) and The Whisper

== Other ==
- Borg (castle), a former stronghold or villa in the province of Groningen, the Netherlands
- Roman Villa Borg, a reconstructed Roman villa rustica in Saarland, Germany
- Borg (drink), a mixed drink made in a gallon jug
- Borg (microbiology), a form of giant virus
- Borg scale, a measurement of perceived exertion in sports science
- Borg Opening, a rare chess opening
- Borg (backup software)
- Borg (cluster manager), software used by Google

== See also ==
- Borg Bastion, a mountain in Antarctica
- Barg (disambiguation)
- Berg (disambiguation)
- Bourg (disambiguation)
- Burg (disambiguation)
- Burj (disambiguation)
- Cyborg (disambiguation)
