= Burcht van Leiden =

Shell keep in Leiden, the Netherlands

- Leiden, the Netherlands
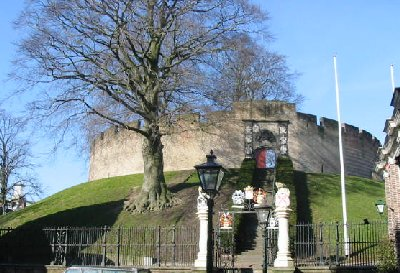
- Burcht van Leiden (shell keep)

Site information
- Type: Castle
- Open to the public: Yes
- Condition: Good

Location
- The Netherlands
- Location within Netherlands
- Coordinates: 52°9′32″N 4°29′32″E

Site history
- Built: 1100

The Burcht van Leiden (Dutch pronunciation: [ˈbʏr(ə)xt fɑn ˈlɛidə(n)]; (Note: In isolation, van is pronounced [vɑn].) Fort of Leiden) is an old shell keep in Leiden constructed in the 11th century. It is located at the spot where two tributaries of the Rhine come together, the Oude Rijn and the Nieuwe Rijn. The structure is on top of a motte, and is today a public park.

== History ==
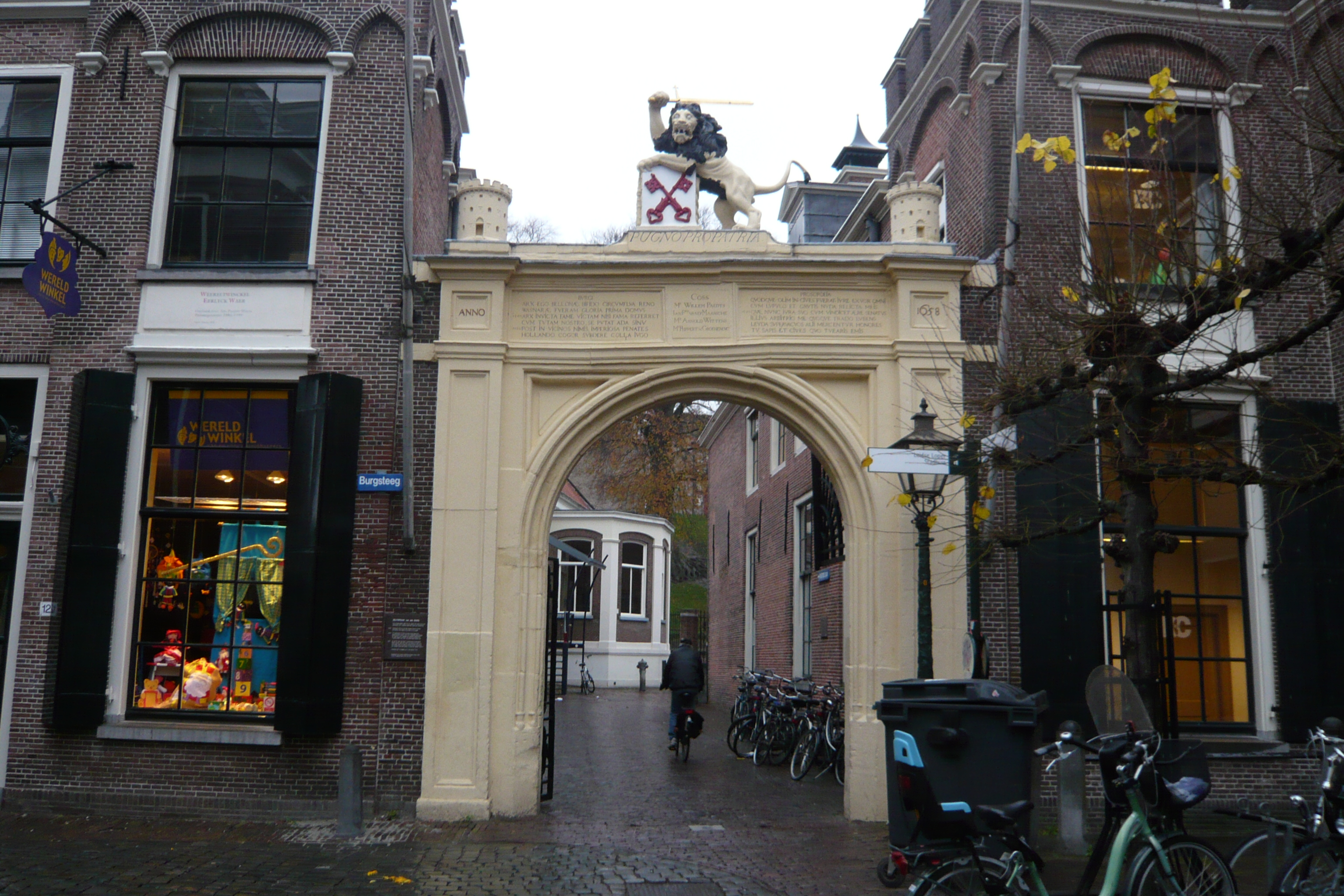
Southern gate to the Burcht with historic timeline 1203, 1420 and 1574 in Latin. Now facing a busy shopping street.

Originally built by Halewijn I in 1060. He was subsequently appointed viscount of Leiden by Count Dirk V of Holland. From humble beginnings, the hill was raised during various periods of history up to 9 m (30 ft) above the surrounding landscape in the 11th century. Ada van Holland used the keep as a residence until her father died in 1203 and she was captured by her paternal uncle, William I. In the same year the previous stone building was rebuilt after an attack on the castle, with tuff stone, and after Ada's removal, in 1204 it was attacked again and rebuilt with brick.

Later in the 13th century the building was considered antiquated, since more and more townspeople and houses were built around the base of the hill, making defenses impossible without destroying most of the city. The old "interior keep" that had been built against the interior walls (a similar rounded keep construction can still be seen in Teylingen) was slowly dismantled and reused for city construction.

== Symbol of Leiden ==
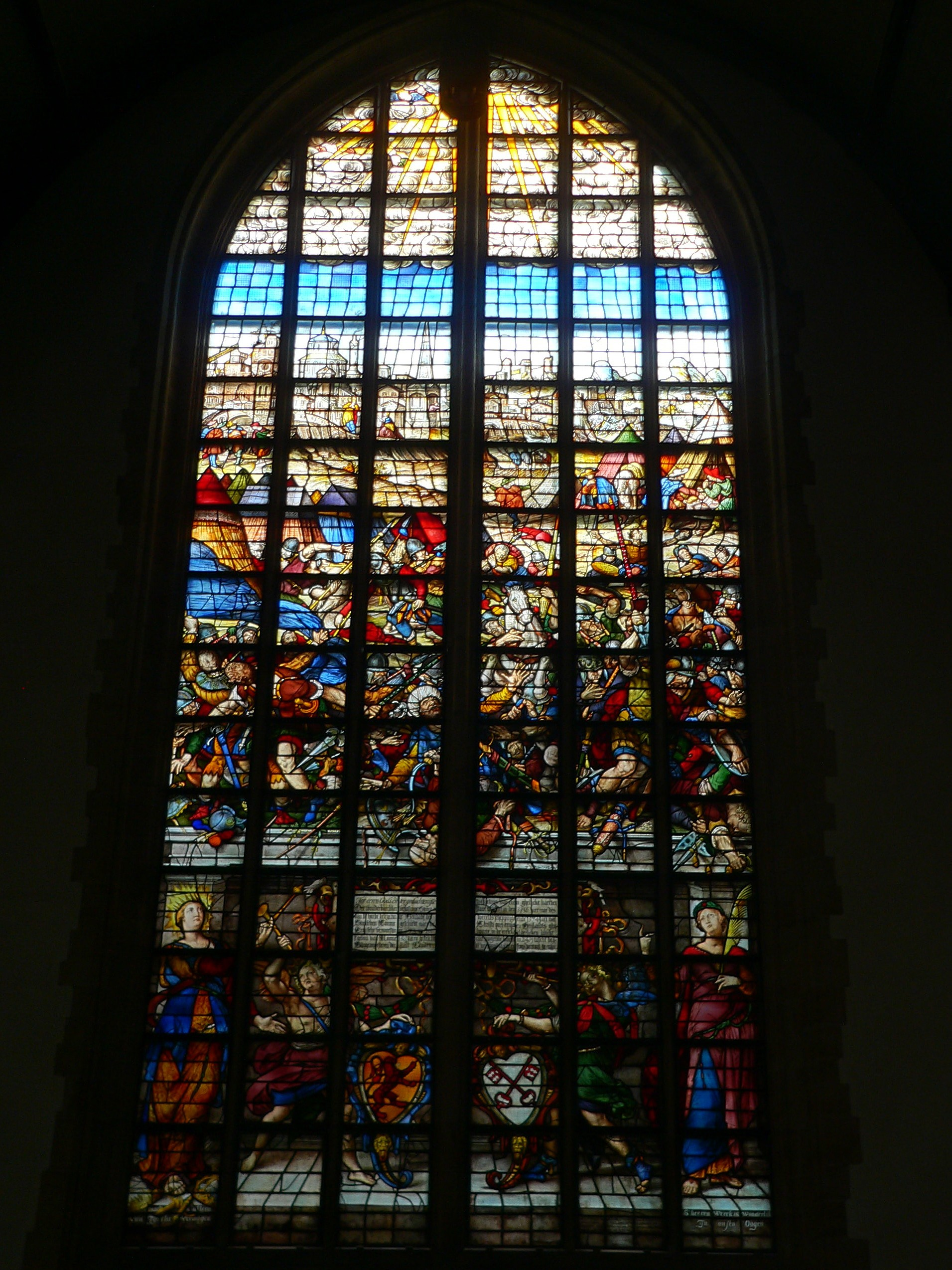
Samaria in Glass 26 by Isaac van Swanenburg, mayor of Leiden, 1601, showing the watchtower above left much like the Burcht.

As the city of Leiden grew around it in the 13th and 14th centuries, the ruined castle lost its military function. The location became a romantic patriotic symbol after the Siege of Leiden in 1574, as historians recalled the earlier sieges of Leiden: Ada in 1203 and the siege in 1420 (Hook and Cod wars). The stained-glass windows number 25 & 26 in the Janskerk (Gouda) designed by the Leiden artist and councilman Isaac van Swanenburg glorify this history in 1601 by commemorating the latest siege (glass 25, paid for by the Delft city council and featuring William the Silent as liberator) with a comparison to the story of the Siege of Samaria (glass 26, paid for by the Leiden city council and featuring the text of the biblical story with God as savior). The city of Samaria is portrayed with a watch tower much like the Leidse Burcht.

== Public park ==
In 1651 the city bought the premises to make it into a water tower for public use. A system of waterpipes leading to squares in the city is still intact. In this period a new portal on the keep wall was designed in 1662 with heraldric symbols by Rombout Verhulst, denoting the leading families of the city. There are two other gates to the Burcht, one at the base of the hill with wrought iron heraldric weapons, built in 1653, and one on the south side of the complex, which itself forms a gateway to the park. In this Southern gateway a poem in Latin was used for centuries to teach the rudiments of grammar to Leiden students. A memorial plaque was placed in 1999 with the modern translation in Dutch.

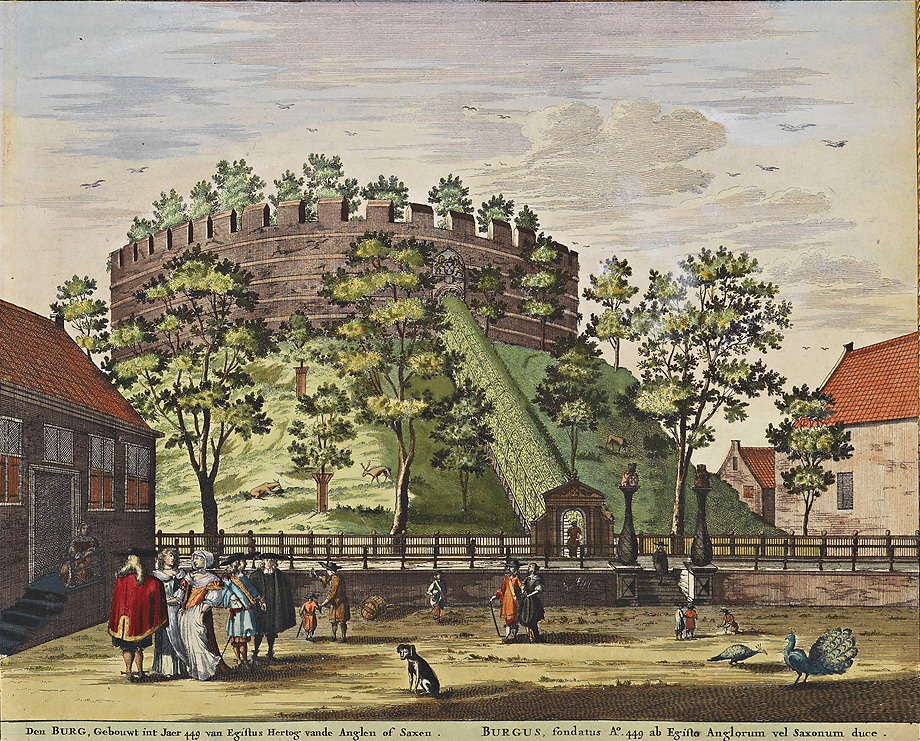
The Burcht in a 1698 print by Frederick de Wit for his atlas

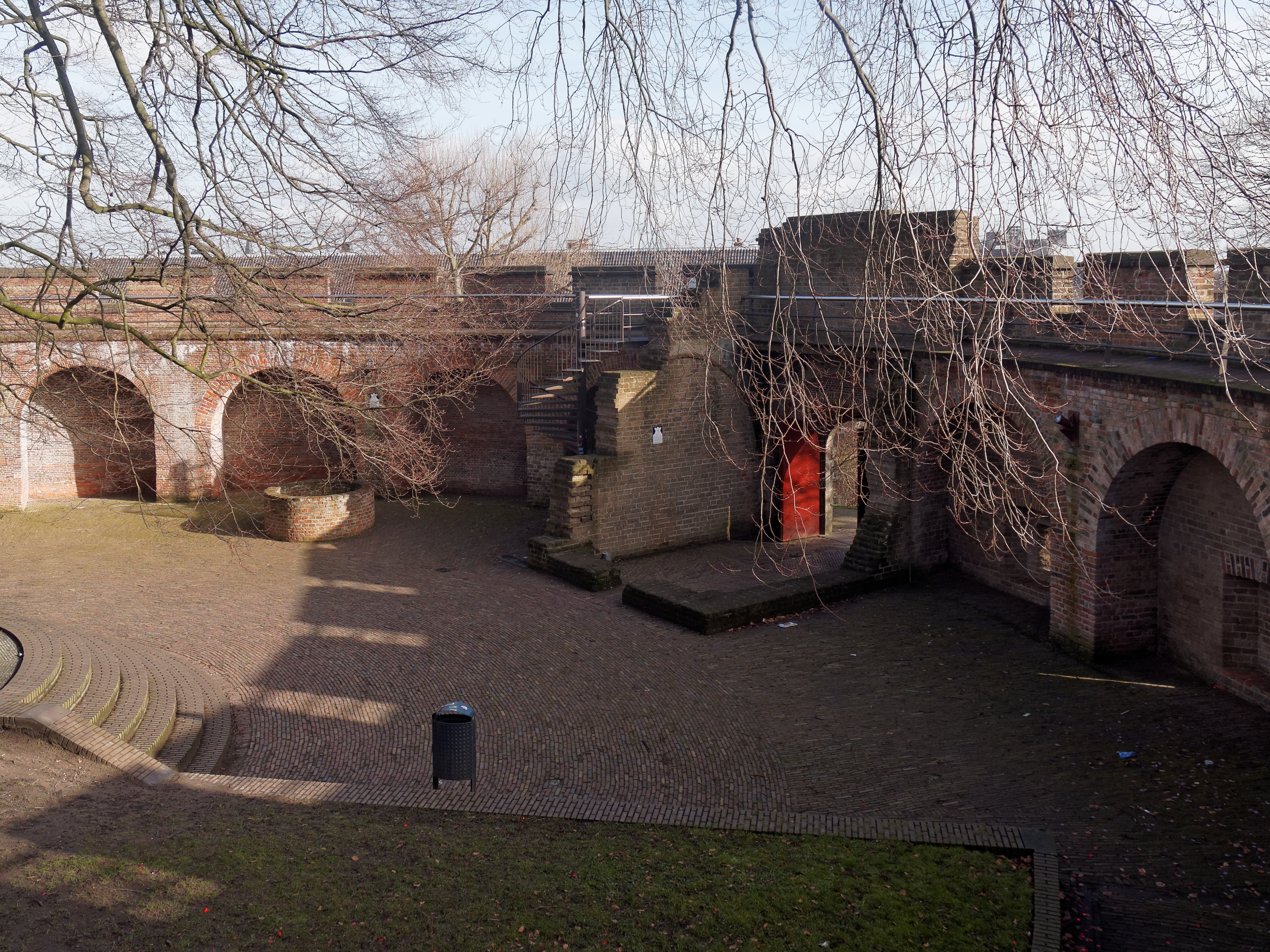
Inside the Burcht, taken from the promenade around the ramparts that offer a panoramic view of the city.

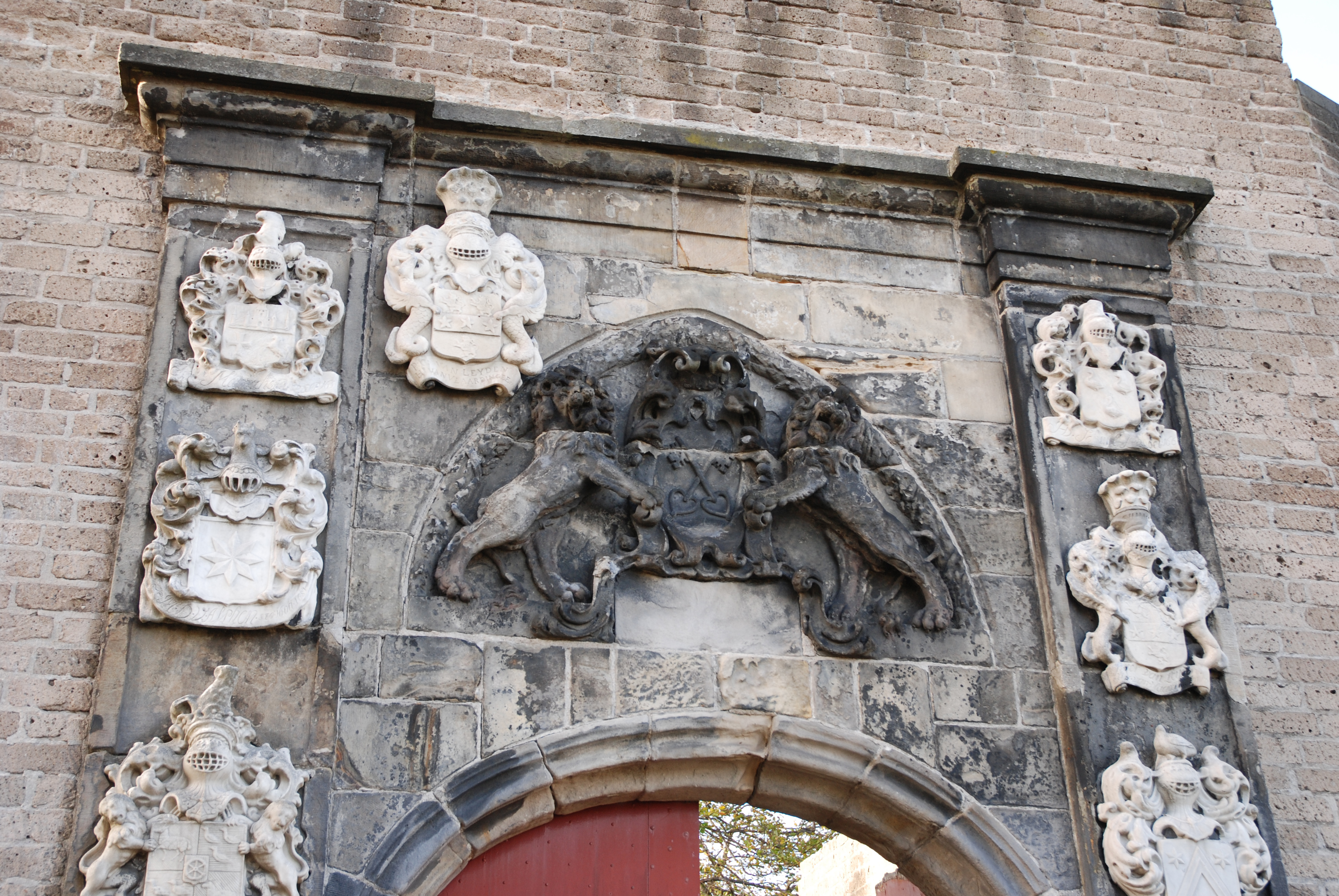
Portal in the keep wall at the top of the steps, by Verhulst, 1658.

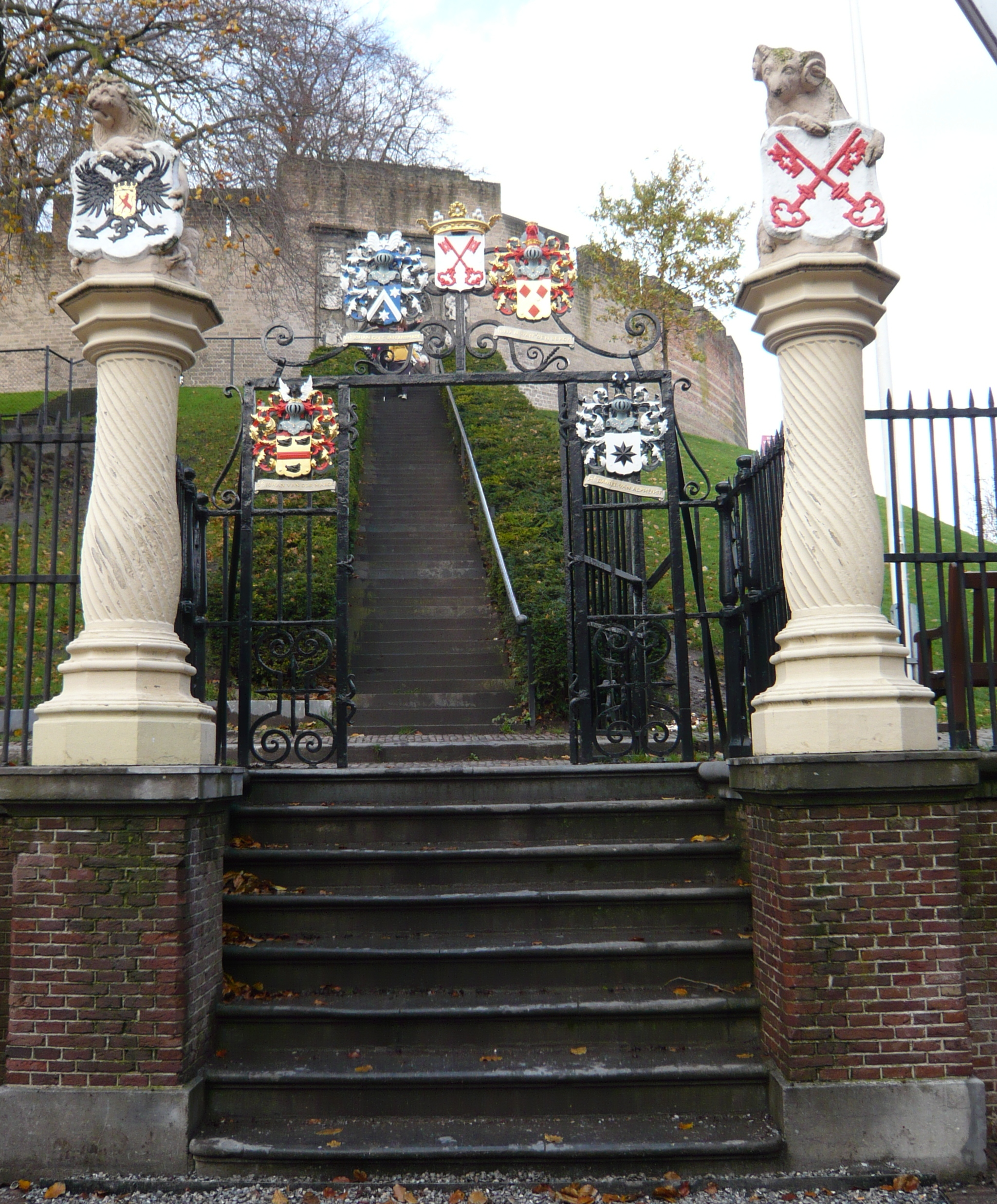
Iron gate at base of the hill, 1653

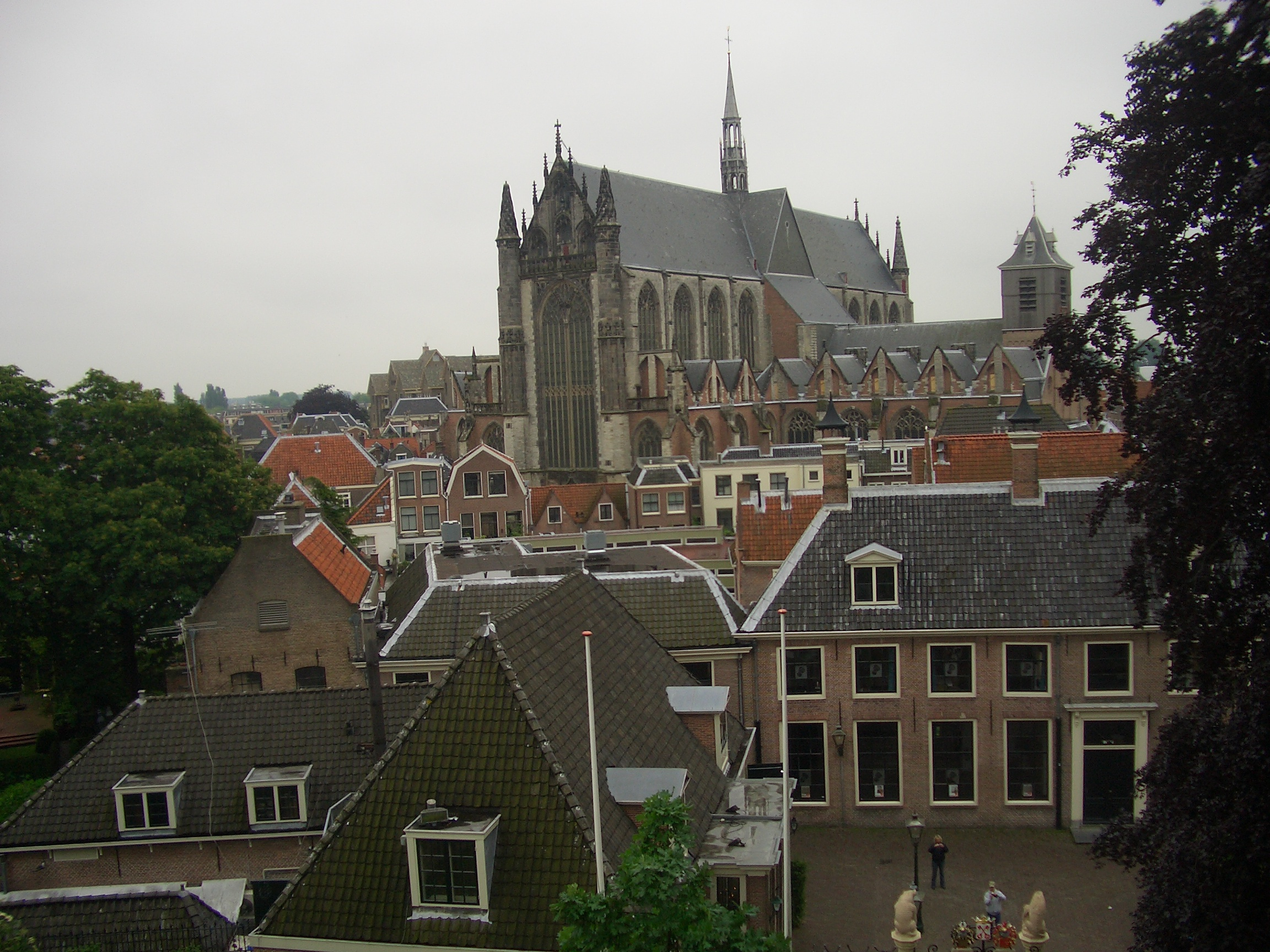
View towards the southeast from the top of the steps, showing the Hooglandse Kerk in the distance, and the back of the wrought iron gate and the Herenlogement in the foreground.

== See also ==
- List of castles in the Netherlands
