= Burg =

The German word Burg means castle. Burg or Bürg may refer to:

== Places ==
=== Placename element ===
- -burg, a combining form in Dutch, German and English placenames
- Burg, a variant of burh, the fortified towns of Saxon England

=== Settlements ===
- Burg, Aargau, Switzerland
- Burg, Bernkastel-Wittlich, Germany
- Burg, Bitburg-Prüm, Germany
- Burg, Brandenburg, Germany
- Burg, Dithmarschen, Germany
- Burg auf Fehmarn, Germany
- Burg bei Magdeburg, Germany
- Burg im Leimental, Switzerland
- Den Burg, Netherlands
- The Burg, Illinois, United States
- Burg, Hautes-Pyrénées, France
- Burg, Kilfinichen and Kilvickeon parish, Scotland
- Melber, Kentucky, United States, also known as Burg

== Other uses ==
- Burg (surname) or Bürg
- Bürg (crater)
- Burg (ship, 2003), a car ferry operating on Switzerland's Lake Zurich
- Burgs (fast-food chain)

== See also ==
- Burgh (disambiguation)
- Borg (disambiguation)
- Bourg (disambiguation)
- Borough and -bury, common English variants of burg
- Burgh, the common Scottish variant of burg
- Burger (disambiguation)
- Bürger
- Burgher (disambiguation)
- Berg (disambiguation), a placename meaning "mountain" or "rock", frequently confused with burg
- Burgk, a settlement in Germany
