= Édouard de Fitz-James, 6th Duke of Fitz-James =

Édouard de Fitz-James, 6th Duke of Fitz-James Duke of Fitz-James
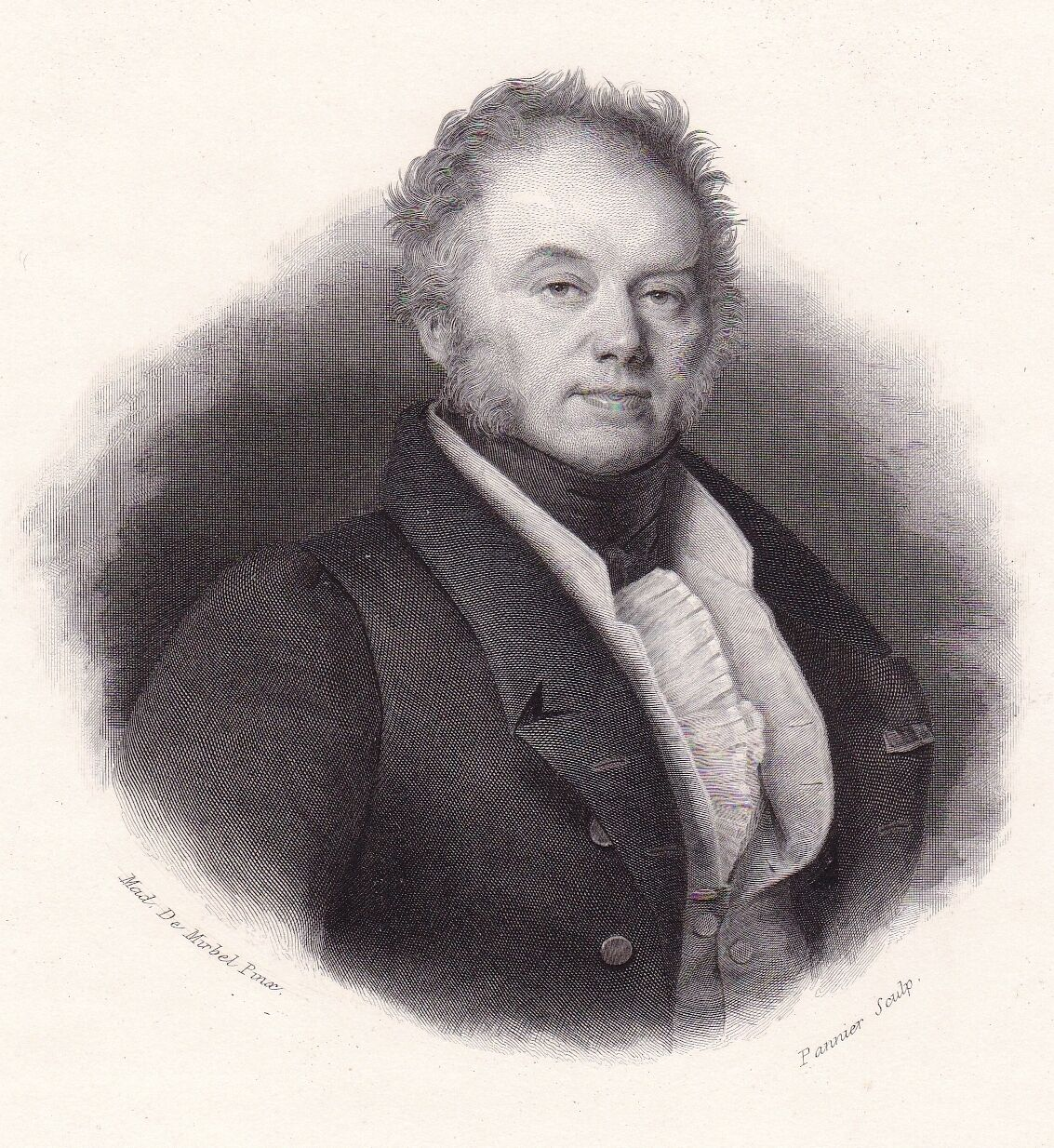
- Édouard, 6th Duke of Fitz-James

MP for Haute-Garonne
- In office 10 January 1835 – 11 November 1838

Personal details
- Born: 10 January 1776 Versailles
- Died: 15 November 1838 (aged 62) Château de La Rivière-Bourdet, Quevillon
- Spouse(s): Elisabeth Le Vassor de la Touche de Longpré (m. 1797; died 1816) Antoinette Françoise Sidonie de Choiseul (m. 1819)
- Relations: Charles de Fitz-James (grandfather); Henri de Thiard de Bissy (grandfather)
- Parent(s): Jacques Charles de Fitz-James; Marie Claudine Silvie de Bissy

Édouard de Fitz-James, 6th Duke of Fitz-James (10 January 1776 – 15 November 1838) was a French soldier, politician, Peer of France, and 6th Duke of Fitz-James, who descended from the British House of Stuart.

== Early life ==
Édouard was born at Versailles on 10 January 1776. He was the second, but eldest surviving, son of Jacques Charles de Fitz-James, 5th Duke of Fitz-James, (1743–1805) and Marie Claudine Silvie de Thiard de Bissy (c. 1752–1812). His elder sister, Henriette Victoire de Fitz-James, who married Charles François Armand de Maillé de La Tour Landry, 2nd Duke of Maillé, in 1784. (Note: His sister was the mother of three children: Armand Paul Claude Charles de Maillé de la Tour Landry (1795–1807), Claire Clemence Henriette Claudine de Maillé de la Tour Landry (1796–1861) (wife of the 2nd Duke of Castries and, reportedly, a lover of the novelist and playwright Honoré de Balzac), and Armand Roger Claude de Maillé de la Tour Landry (b. 1799). After his sister's death in 1809, the Duke of Maillé married Blanche-Joséphine Le Bascle d'Argenteuil. As both of Henriette Victoire' sons died, without issue, before their father, the Duke's son from his second marriage succeeded to the dukedom of Maillé in 1837.)

His paternal grandparents were Charles de Fitz-James, 4th Duke of Fitz-James (younger son of James FitzJames, 1st Duke of Berwick, who was an illegitimate son of King James II of England), and the former Victoire Goyon de Matignon (a granddaughter of Field Marshal Charles-Auguste de Goyon). His paternal aunt was Laure-Auguste de Fitz-James, the wife of Philippe Gabriel Maurice d'Alsace de Hénin-Liétard, 6th Prince of Chimay, and the Première dame d'honneur to the Queen of France. His maternal grandparents were the former Anne Brissart and Gen. Henri de Thiard de Bissy, who was guillotined on the day Robespierre fell during the French Revolution.

== Career ==
After the outbreak of the French Revolution, Édouard escaped to Italy. He later joined the Condé Army of émigrés where he served as aide-de-camp to Marshal Charles Eugène Gabriel de La Croix.

He returned to France in 1801 around the time of the Bourbon Restoration, succeeding his father as the 6th Duke of Fitz-James on 11 August 1805. In 1813, he accepted the rank of Corporal in the first legion of the National Guard and was sent to the barrier of Monceau on 30 March 1814. During the Bourbon Restoration and became aide-de-camp and First Gentleman of the Chamber of the Count of Artois (later King Charles X), Colonel of the National Guard and Peer of France on 4 June 1814. He accompanied the king's brother on his tour of the South of France and Lyon.

During the Hundred Days in 1815, he went to Ghent with Louis XVIII before returning to Paris and taking his place in the Chamber of Peers where he was known for his ultraroyalist views. On 21 October 1815, he put forth a vote of thanks to the Duke of Angoulême.

He distinguished himself during the trial of Marshal Michel Ney, judged by the Chamber of Peers, by insisting on death penalty, the verdict which he brought to the Palais des Tuileries on 6 December 1815. He also played a role in the trial brought against Gen. Henri Gatien Bertrand, his brother-in-law, by publishing a letter in which he claimed that the general had taken an oath to Louis XVIII.

From 10 January 1835 to 11 November 1838, he represented Haute-Garonne in the third legislature.

== Personal life ==
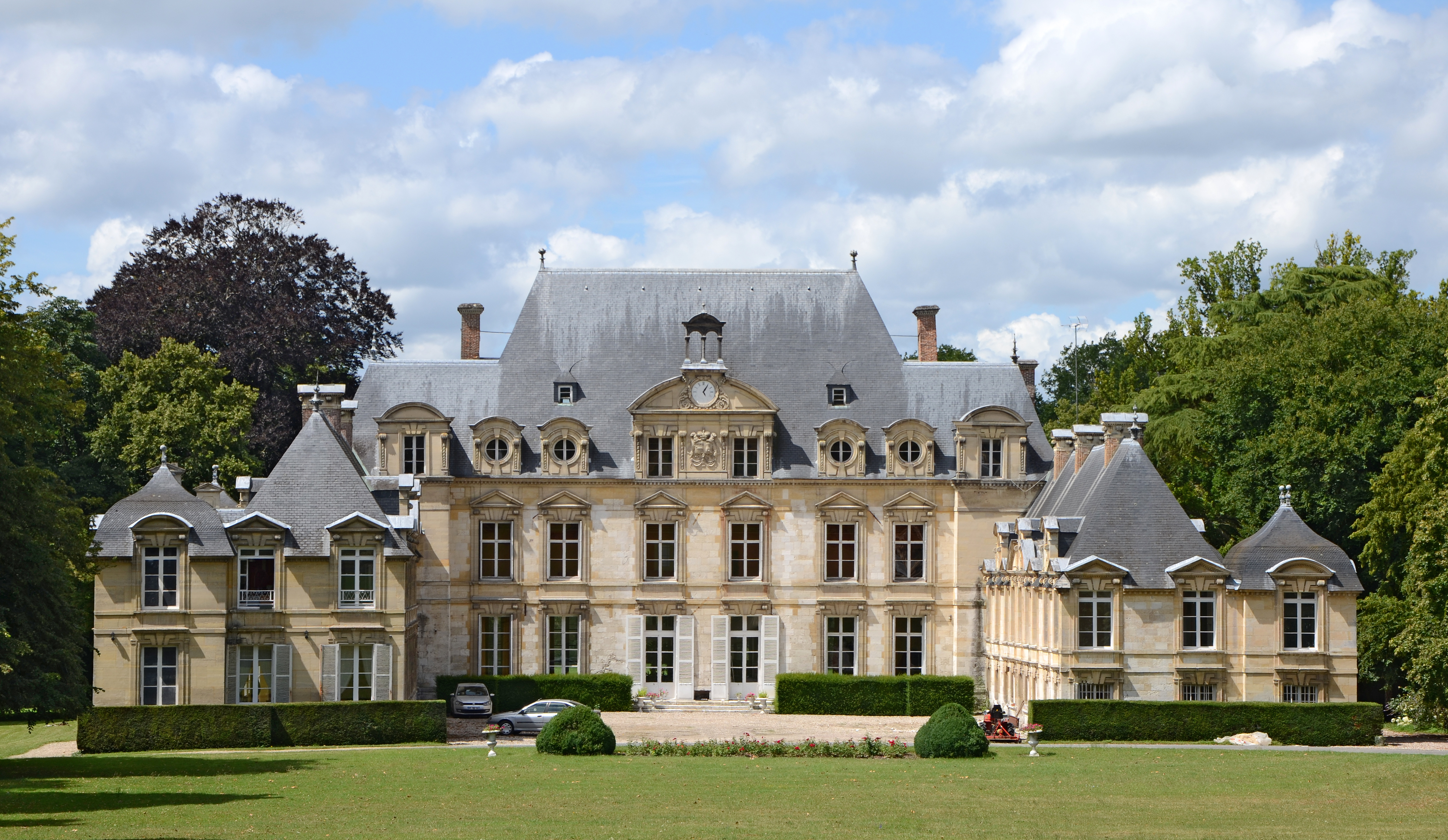
The Château de La Rivière-Bourdet in Quevillon

On 2 May 1797, Édouard married Elisabeth "Betsy" Alexandrine Le Vassor de la Touche de Longpré (1775–1816) in England. She was a daughter of François Le Vassor de La Touche de Longpré and the former Anne Girardin de Montgerald. Before her death in 1816, they were the parents of:

- Antoinette Alexandrine Claudine de Fitz-James (1799–1837), who died unmarried.
- Jacques Marie Emmanuel de Fitz-James (1803–1846), who married Marguerite de Marmier, a daughter of Philippe-Gabriel de Marmier, 1st Duke of Marmier, in 1826.
- Henri Charles François de Fitz-James (1805–1883), who married Cécile de Poilly, daughter of Charles de Poilly, in Rome in 1833.

After the death of his first wife, he remarried to Antoinette Françoise Sidonie de Choiseul (1777–1862) on 6 December 1819 in Paris. She was a daughter of Gabriel de Choiseul-Daillecourt and the former Adélaïde de Gouffier d'Heilly. She was the widow of Alexandre du Moucel, Marquess of Torcy from whom she inherited from him the Château de La Rivière-Bourdet near Rouen.

The Duke of Fitz-James died at the Château de La Rivière-Bourdet in Quevillon on 15 November 1838 and was succeeded in the dukedom by his son, Jacques.

=== Descendants ===
Through his son, Jacques, he was a grandfather to Édouard Antoine Sidoine de Fitz-James, 8th Duke of Fitz-James (1828–1906), who married Marguerite Augusta Marie Löwenhielm, a French mycologist who was the daughter of Count Gustaf Löwenhielm.

French nobility
Preceded by Jacques de Fitz-James	Duke of Fitz-James; 1805 – 1838	Succeeded by Jacques de Fitz-James
