= Charles de Fitz-James, 4th Duke of Fitz-James =

French general

Charles
- duc de Fitz-James
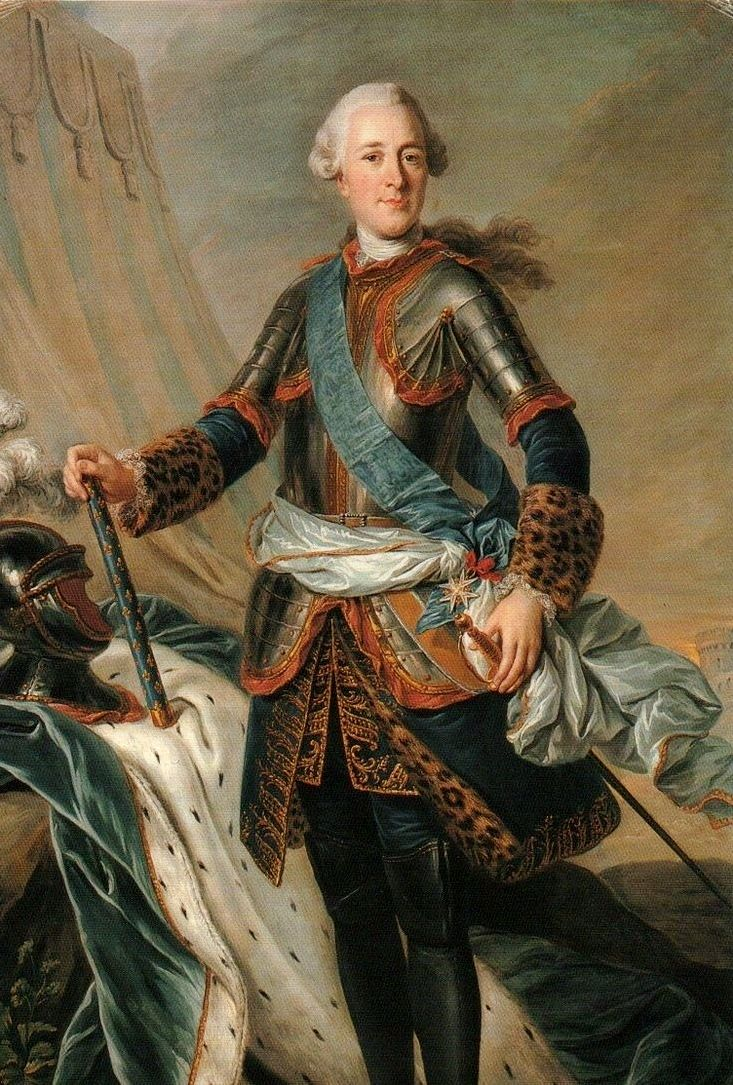
- Full name: Charles, duc de Fitz-James
- Born: 4 November 1712; Saint-Germain-en-Laye, France
- Died: 22 March 1787 (aged 58); Hôtel Fitz-James, Paris
- Noble family: FitzJames
- Spouse: Louise Victoire Goyon
- Issue: Jacques Charles, 5th Duke of FitzJames; Laure Auguste, Princess of Chimay
- Father: James FitzJames, Duke of Berwick
- Mother: Lady Honora de Burgh
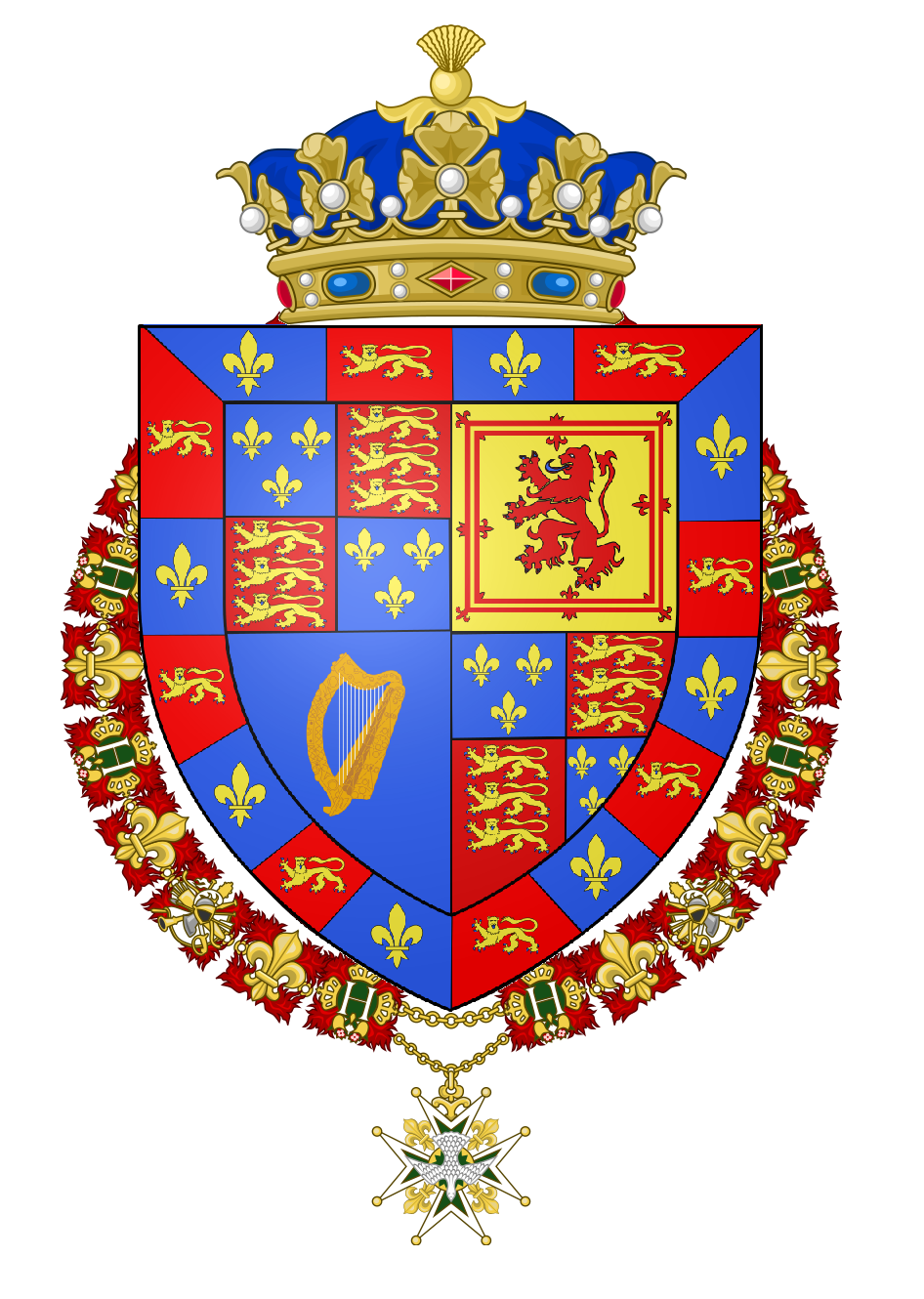

Charles, duc de Fitz-James (4 November 1712 in Saint-Germain-en-Laye – 22 March 1787 at his hôtel particulier, Paris) was a French general and 4th Duke of Fitz-James, who descended from the British House of Stuart. He rose to become a peer and Marshal of France.

== Life ==
=== Early life ===
He was the son of James FitzJames, 1st Duke of Berwick, who was in turn an illegitimate son of James II of England. He was known from birth as the "count of Fitz-James". When his eldest brother Henri de Fitz-James was dismissed and another elder brother François de Fitz-James took holy orders, Charles was made governor and lieutenant-general of Limousin on 28 December 1729, aged only 17. In 1730 he joined the musketeers, on 31 March 1732 he was given a commission to command a company in the Montreval cavalry regiment, and in 1733 he was put in command of an Irish cavalry regiment, which was renamed the Fitz-James regiment after him.

1733 also saw Europe's peace broken for the first time in twenty years after the death of Augustus, king of Poland. A French army under Charles's father invaded Germany, whilst Charles saw his first active service at the head of his regiment at the sieges of Kehl (1733) and Philippsbourg (1734). He was standing next to his father when the latter was killed by a cannonball and was splattered with his blood and brains. Inheriting his father's dukedom and becoming a peer of France, Charles continued serving with the French army on the Rhine under the orders of Marshal de Coigny from 1735 until the peace of Vienna in 1738. In 1735 he also became one of the first French Freemasons in the Bussy Lodge.

=== War of the Austrian Succession ===
Charles VI's death in 1740 triggered another European war, with France backing the elector of Bavaria's claims to the imperial throne. In 1741, a French army of 40,000 men crossed the Rhine at Fort-Louis, under the orders of the Charles Louis Auguste Fouquet, whilst another army the same size crossed the Meuse at the same time – Charles served in the latter as a brigadier, under the orders of Jean-Baptiste Francois des Marets, marquis de Maillebois. He took part in most of the war's battles and also served in Belle-Isle's army at the Siege of Prague and the retreat which followed.

Returning to France in July 1743, he ended his campaign in Basse-Alsace serving under Marshal de Noailles. In 1744 he was promoted to maréchal-de-camp and fought in the king's army at that rank, commanding the siege works at the 1745 siege of Tournay, fighting at the French victory at Fontenoy and serving at the sieges of Oudenaarde and Dendermonde. In 1746 he joined the French army in Flanders under the Marshal de Saxe, covering the sieges of Mons, Saint-Guilhain and Charleroi and serving at the Siege of Namur (1746) and the victory at Rocourt.

The Battle of Lauffeld – bloodier than Fontenoy – opened France's 1747 campaign in the Netherlands. The Duke of Fitz-James fought there before joining the Siege of Bergen op Zoom (1747) by Lowendahl. He also fought at the Siege of Maestricht when peace was signed between France, Britain and the Netherlands in 1748. Hostilities were barely over when, on 10 May 1748, the Duke of Fitz-James was promoted to lieutenant general. He was also made a peer of France and knight of the orders of the King (received 2 February 1756).

=== Seven Years' War ===
At the outbreak of the Seven Years' War, he was again recalled to lead several Army Corps in Germany. He fought in the Battle of Hastenbeck (1757), Krefeld (1758) and Lutterberg (1758). In the lost Battle of Minden, fought on 1 August 1759, he was in command of the entire French cavalry, with which he charged the enemy without success. He was sent back to France in November 1760, and became on 16 September 1761, commander of the Languedoc province.

=== Later life ===
In 1763, a conflict over taxes broke out between him and the Parlement of Toulouse, which resulted in violence. Fitz-James had to resign and lived in disgrace until 1766, when he became commander of Béarn, Navarre and Guyenne. In 1764 he succeeded his elder brother, François, as Duke of Fitz-James. In 1771 he became commander of the Brittany province. In 1775 he was made a Marshal of France and retired.

== Family ==
He married in 1741 with Victoire Goyon (1722–1777), granddaughter of French Field Marshal Charles-Auguste de Goyon.
They had 7 children, including:

- Jacques Charles, 5th Duke of FitzJames (26 November 1743 – 11 August 1805), 5th Duke of Fitz-James and French Maréchal de camp.
- Laure Auguste de Fitz-James

== Bibliography ==
- Marie-Nicolas Bouillet et Alexis Chassang (ed.), « Charles de Fitz-James » in Dictionnaire universel d’histoire et de géographie, 1878 (Wikisource) ;
- « Charles de Fitz-James », in Louis-Gabriel Michaud, Biographie universelle ancienne et moderne : histoire par ordre alphabétique de la vie publique et privée de tous les hommes avec la collaboration de plus de 300 savants et littérateurs français ou étrangers, 2e édition, 1843–1865;
- Michel Popoff and preface by Hervé Pinoteau, Armorial de l'Ordre du Saint-Esprit : d'après l'œuvre du père Anselme et ses continuateurs, Paris, Le Léopard d'or, 1996, 204 p. (ISBN 2-86377-140-X);

French nobility
Preceded by François de Fitz-James	Duke of Fitz-James; 1764 – 1787	Succeeded by Jacques Charles de Fitz-James
