= Jacques Charles de Fitz-James, 5th Duke of Fitz-James =

French officer (1743–1805)

Jacques Charles de Fitz-James
- 5th Duke of Fitz-James
- Full name: Jacques Charles de Fitz-James
- Born: 16 November 1743; Paris, France
- Died: 11 August 1805 (aged 61); Paris, France
- Spouse: 26 December 1768, Marie Claudine Sylvie de Bissy (m. 26 December 1768)
- Issue: Henriette, Marquise of Maillé; Édouard, 6th Duke of Fitz-James
- Father: Charles de Fitz-James
- Mother: Louise Victoire Goyon
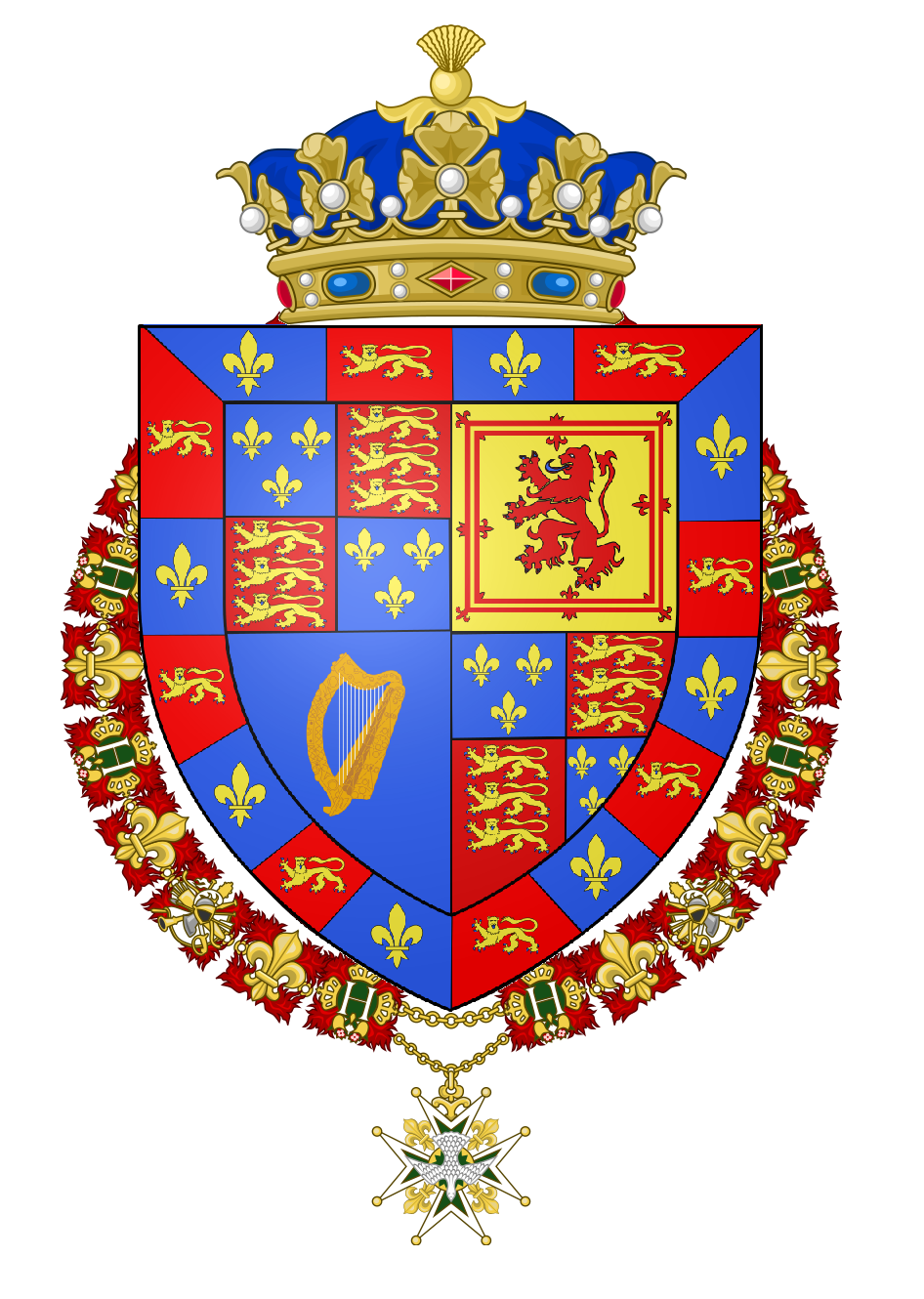

Jacques Charles de Fitz-James, 5th Duke of Fitz-James (16 November 1743 – 11 August 1805) was a French-born nobleman.

He was a grandson of James FitzJames, 1st Duke of Berwick, himself an illegitimate son of King James II and VII by Arabella Churchill, herself a sister of the 1st Duke of Marlborough while his mother was a daughter of Charles Auguste de Goyon, Count of Gacé, Marshal of France. During the French Revolution, Fitz-James was also part of the Armée des Émigrés.

== Marriage ==
On 26 December 1768, he married Marie Claudine Sylvie de Bissy, daughter of Henri Charles Gabriel de Bissy, Count of Thiard.

=== Children ===
1. Henriette Victoire de Fitz-James (born 10 October 1770) married the Marquis de Maillé.
2. Charles Jean de Fitz-James (born 1773)
3. Édouard de Fitz-James, 6th Duke of Fitz-James (10 January 1776 – 15 November 1838)

== Titles ==
- 16 November 1743 – 22 March 1787: The Marquis of Fitz-James
- 22 March 1787 – 11 August 1805: The Duke of Fitz-James, Peer of France
