= Château de La Rivière-Bourdet =

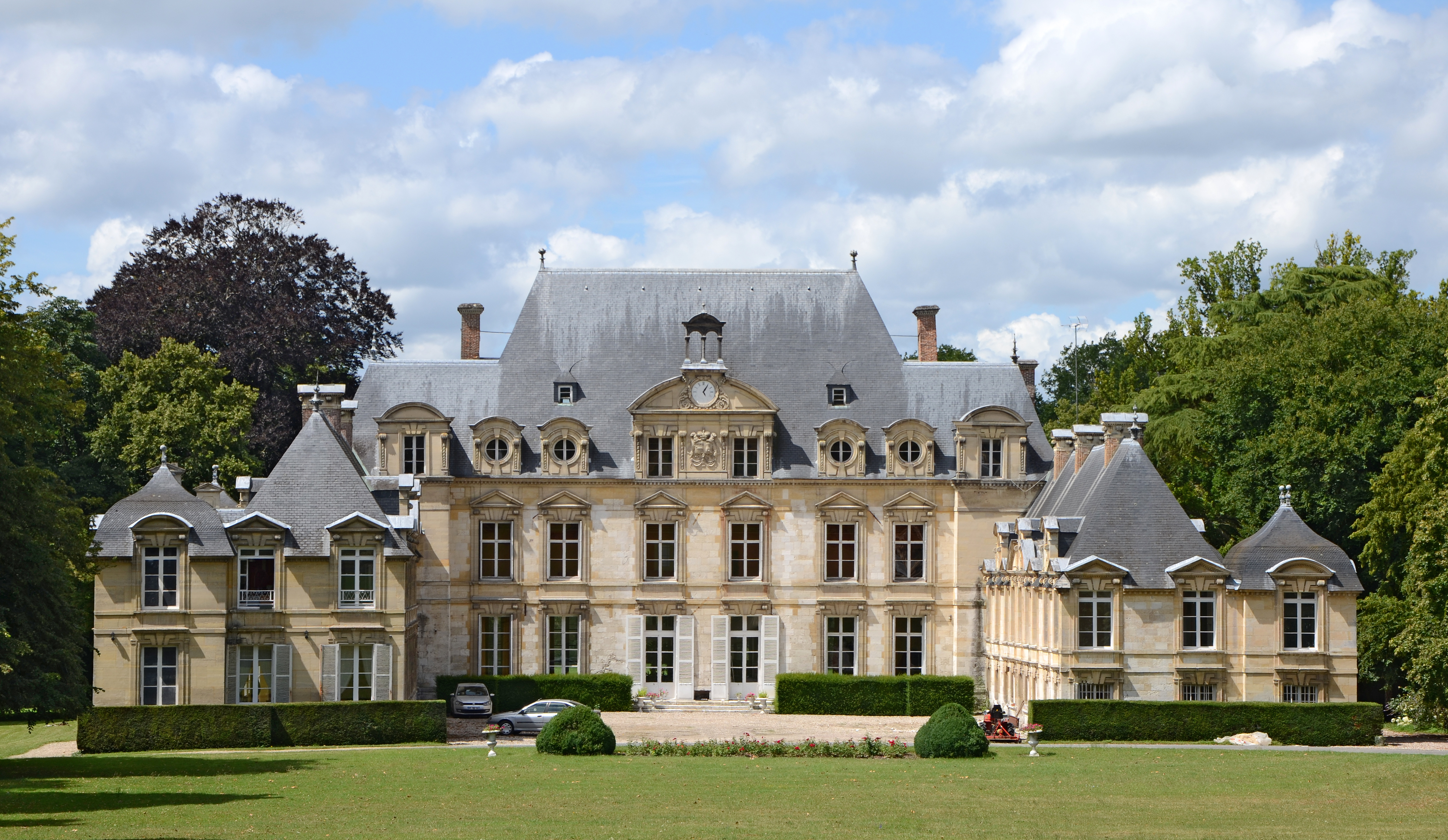
- Interactive map of the Château de La Rivière-Bourdet area

General information
- Type: Château
- Location: Quevillon, Seine-Maritime, Normandy, France
- Coordinates: 49°24′48″N 0°56′42″E
- Construction started: 17th century
- Owner: Private

Château de La Rivière-Bourdet is located in Quevillon in the Seine-Maritime department of France on the banks of the Seine. The castle was listed as a Monument historique on 30 November 1934.

== History ==
The first château was built on this site in the 13th century by Étienne Bourdet, after whom the estate was named. It was destroyed in 1570 and likely rebuilt in the 1620s on the initiative of Charles II Maignart de Bernières. The estate passed through the Moucel family until the death of Alexandre du Moucel, marquis de Torcy's widow in 1862. (Note: Upon the death of Alexandre du Moucel, marquis de Torcy, in 1818, the château passed to his widow, the former Antoinette Françoise Sidonie de Choiseul (a daughter of Gabriel de Choiseul). In 1819, she married Édouard de Fitz-James, Duke of Fitz-James. Fitz-James died at the château in 1838 followed by Antoinette's death at the château in 1862.) In 1862, it was acquired by the Montholon-Sémonville family who owned it until 1940, when it was acquired by Brillet de Candé.

During World War II, it was occupied before serving as a school camp in 1944 for 200 children from Le Havre, Dieppe and Rouen. The south wing was damaged during a bombardment in July 1944 after which it was abandoned for a number of years.

In 1962, it was sold before becoming a retirement home in 1966, which operated until 1995. In 2011, it was owned by Chantal Trapes and her sister, who inherited it from their parents.

== In popular culture ==
In 1723, Voltaire stayed at the château and wrote parts of Hérode et Mariamne and Henriade there.

In the early 1830s, Honoré de Balzac stayed at the château and, reportedly, was inspired by it for the setting of his novel Le Médecin de campagne.
