= Siege of Kehl =

The siege of Kehl may refer to one of four sieges of the fortress above the town of Kehl, located in present-day southwestern Germany, across the Rhine River from Strasbourg:

- Siege of Kehl (1678), during the Franco-Dutch War
- Siege of Kehl (1703), during the War of the Spanish Succession
- Siege of Kehl (1733), during the War of the Polish Succession
- Siege of Kehl (1796–1797), during the French Revolutionary Wars
