= Gaspard le Compasseur de Créquy-Montfort Courtivron =

Gaspard le Compasseur de Créquy-Montfort Courtivron (28 February 1715 – 5 October 1785) was a French knight and nobleman who wrote on mechanics, optics and theories of animal disease.

Courtivron was born in Château de Courtivron, Côte-d’Or, France to Jean Le Compasseur, Marquis de Courtivron, advisor to the King and president of the Parliament of Burgundy and his wife of Charlotte de Clermont-Tonnerre. He received some formal education before joining a family regiment in 1730 and saw action at the siege of Philippsbourg. After the campaigns, he then became interested in science particularly that with military applications. He began to study under Alexis-Claude Clairaut. During the War of the Austrian Succession he was injured and he gave up his military career for science. He studied statics and dynamics and came up with the idea that if a system is in static equilibrium, it is in a local minimum of potential energy. He also supported Newton's ideas in contrast to Cartesian views on light and wrote on Fermat's principle of least time in optics. In 1744 he was elected to the Royal Academy of Sciences. He encouraged Étienne Jean Boucher to write on forges and foundries, iron and steel making. In 1745 he published on rinderpest outbreaks and their contagiousness and helped outlaw the use of the hides from animals that had died from disease. He retired to his country estate in 1765.
