= Siege of San Sebastián (1719) =

1719 siege

- Part of War of the Quadruple Alliance
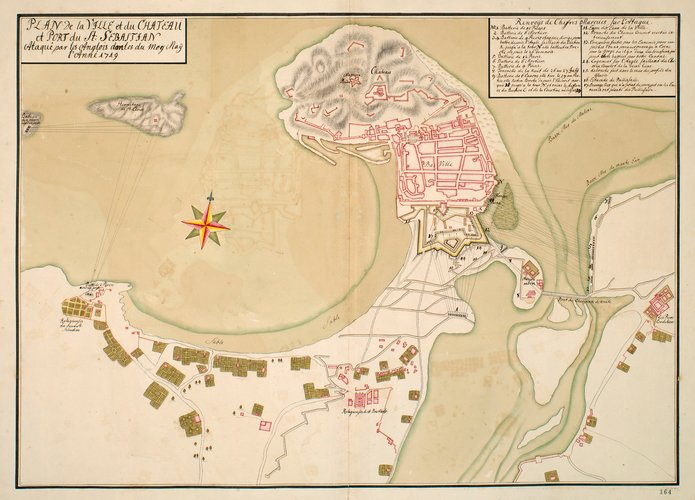
- Map of the city at the time of the siege
Date	30 June – 19 August 1719
Location	San Sebastián, Spain
Result	French victory

Belligerents
Spain	(Kingdom of France) France

Commanders and leaders
(Spain) Alexandro De la Motte	(Kingdom of France) James FitzJames, 1st Duke of Berwick

Strength
1,500	10,000+

The siege of San Sebastián took place in 1719 during the War of the Quadruple Alliance when French forces under the Duke of Berwick successfully laid siege to the Spanish city of San Sebastián close to the French border. Combined with the British capture of Vigo and Pontevedra, this led the Spanish to seek peace terms and the war ended with the agreement of the Treaty of The Hague in 1720.

== Background ==
The War of the Spanish Succession ended in 1714 following the compromise Peace of Utrecht which kept the French candidate Philip V on the throne, but forced him to give up many of his overseas possessions. However, Spain wished to reclaim lost territories in Italy and in 1718 invaded Sicily and Sardinia, triggering a fresh war with Austria in the belief that none of the other great powers would intervene.

Former enemies Britain and France had become allied in 1717. Both entered the conflict to maintain the European Balance of Power. In turn Spain tried to knock both out of the war by launching an invasion to support a planned Jacobite uprising in Britain while also engaging in the Cellamare conspiracy, a plot to overthrow the French government. Both were unsuccessful, and the Allies made plans to launch attacks on mainland Spain itself to try and hasten the end of the war.

== Invasion ==
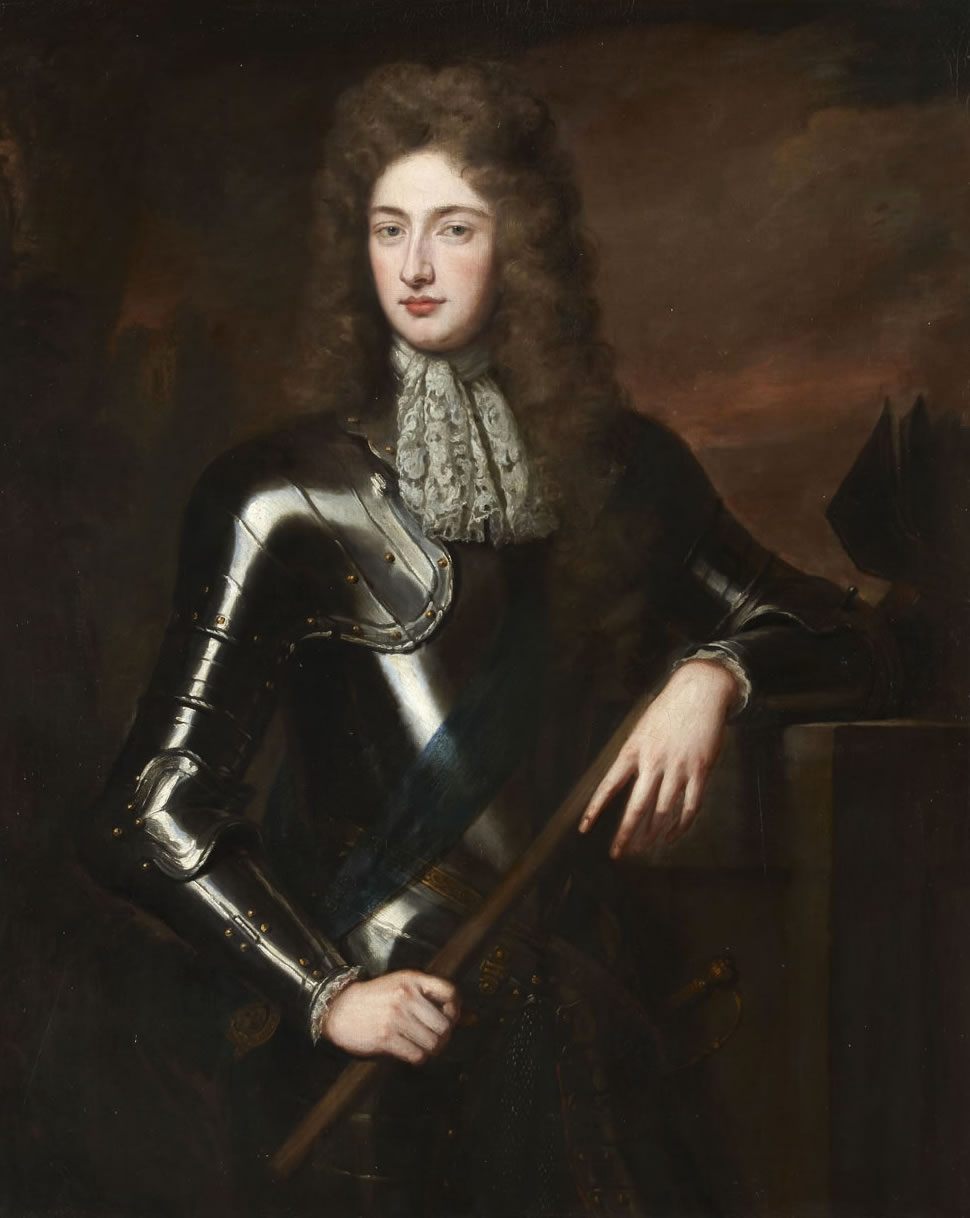
The Duke of Berwick led the French invasion of Spain. During the earlier War of the Spanish Succession he had commanded Spanish troops when the two countries were allies.

In September 1718 Berwick was ordered by the French Regent, the Duke of Orléans, to begin preparing an invasion of northern Spain. Although there was some scepticism whether France would really attack their recent allies, in April 1719 French forces began crossing the border, and they were joined by Berwick who departed Bordeaux on 11 May. Berwick's force was accompanied by the British envoy William Stanhope who acted as an advisor.

French forces managed to take fortifications allowing them across the River Bidasoa near Hondarribia. Extensive naval stores were captured including six men-of-war under construction. A counterattack by the Spanish garrison of San Sebastian was then driven back. Marching from Irun, Berwick laid siege to Hondarribia and captured it on 18 June. This allowed him to advance on San Sebastian with his rear secured. A Spanish force of 13,000 commanded by Philip V had gathered at Pamplona and advanced to Lessaca but then withdrew when news of the fall of Hondarribia reached them.

== Siege ==
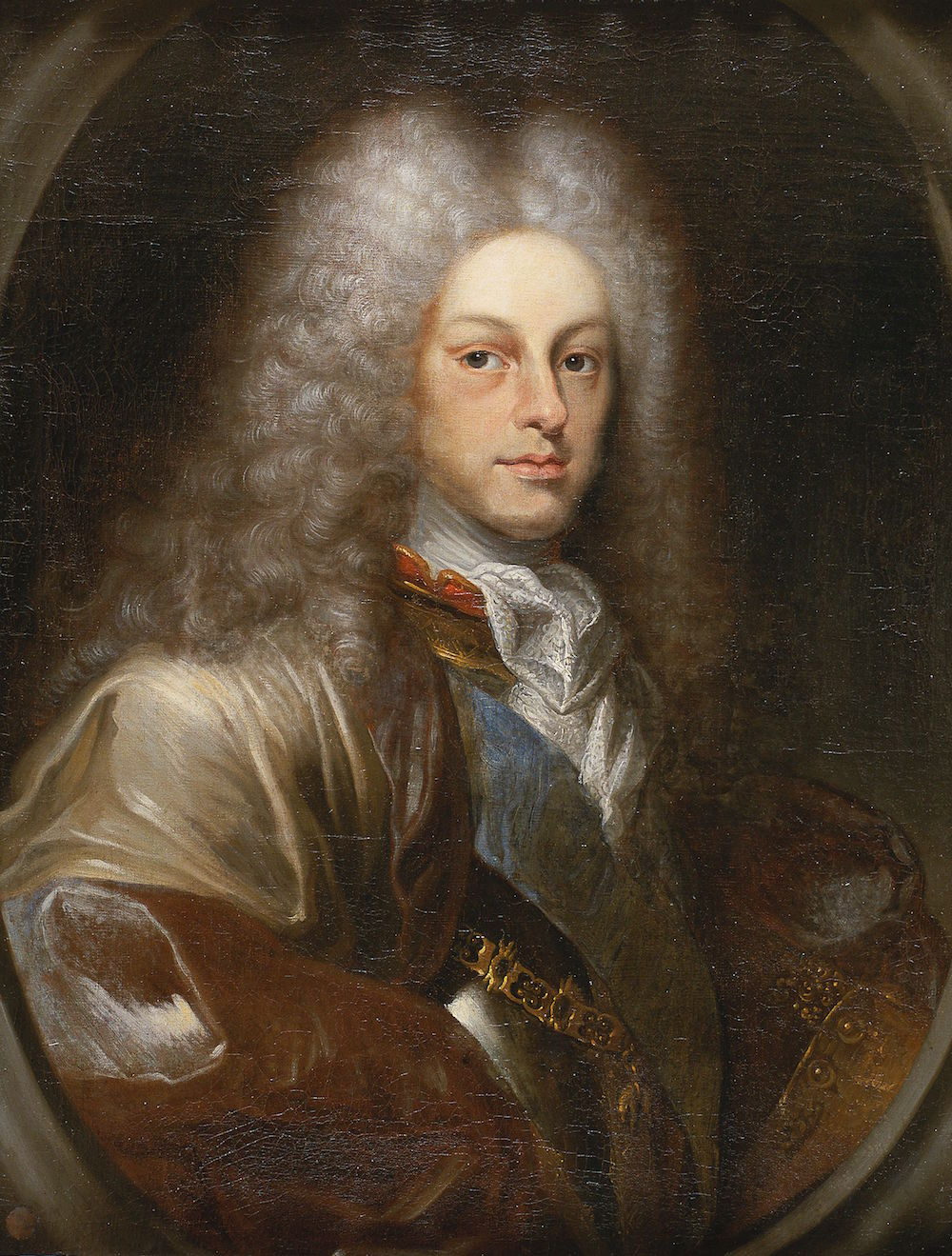
Philip V of Spain. His ambitions plan to reconquer lost territories in Italy was dealt a setback by the French seizure of San Sebastian and he made peace the following year.

The French invested San Sebastian on 30 June, and began positioning batteries along the River Urumea where Berwick considered the city's walls were most vulnerable. Delays due to heavy rain slowed the digging of trenches and it was only 25 July that the French artillery was able to open fire on the walls. The siege guns rapidly created a breach by their battering, and pounded it until it was practical to be stormed. As was the convention at the time, the Spanish commander Alexandro de la Motte requested a parley and his garrison were allowed to retreat into the citadel, leaving the remainder of the city to French control.

The citadel was well positioned, its height on a high rocky hill making it much harder to assault. Berwick used mortars to bombard the citadel, but this did little damage to the fortifications. Berwick considered that it might be necessary to blockade it into surrender by exhausting the garrison's supplies. Three days after the French began investing the citadel, the defenders launched a sudden sortie and managed to inflict seventy casualties on the besiegers. However, they failed to destroy siege works and were rapidly driven off with heavy casualties of their own.

The main Spanish army under Philip remained at Pamplona, making no effort to relieve the garrison. On 11 August a detachment of 750 French infantry, escorted by the British Royal Navy, launched a successful attack on a port town of Santoña along the coast beyond Bilbao doing more damage to Spanish naval resources.

Meanwhile, Berwick was able at last to establish batteries with a clearer range on the citadel, and launched fresh bombardments of mortar fire. These did considerably more damage destroying buildings as they rained down. One shot struck the magazine storing the garrison's grenades, and their food provisions were also destroyed. Morale in the garrison rapidly declined, and their commander sought terms from Berwick. The Spanish surrendered but were permitted to march out with the honours of war.

== Aftermath ==
After San Sebastian was in his hands, Berwick received the submission of many of the leading figures of the surrounding Basque province of Guipúzcoa, who suggested that they would rather be subjects of Louis XV and their province should be annexed by France. Berwick also received similar messages from Catalan leaders, who had during the earlier War of the Spanish Succession supported the rival Austrian candidate Charles and were still resentful of the loss of much of their independence following the Fall of Barcelona in 1714.

Berwick received orders to advance towards Catalonia, and made plans to take the towns of Urgel and Rosas in the north of the province. He captured the first but increasingly bad weather forced him to abandon the siege of the latter. By this time British forces had successfully captured Vigo and Pontevedra in the west, putting further pressure on the Spanish war effort. A Spanish attempt to launch a counter invasion against Brittany was a failure. Philip dismissed his chief minister Giulio Alberoni in December 1719 and sought peace. By the terms of the Treaty of The Hague San Sebastian and the other territory occupied by France was handed back to Spain.

Nearly a century later in 1813 an Allied force commanded by the Duke of Wellington used similar tactics as Berwick had to capture San Sebastian during the Peninsular War.

== Bibliography ==
- Black, Jeremy. Fortifications and Siegecraft: Defense and Attack through the Ages. Rowman & Littlefield, 2018.
- Duffy, Christopher. The Fortress in the Age of Vauban and Frederick the Great 1660-1789. Routledge, 2015.
- Oates, Jonathon D. The Last Armada: Britain and the War of the Quadruple Alliance, 1718-1720. Helion and Company, 2019.
