= François de Fitz-James =

Roman Catholic bishop and chaplain to Louis XV

- Bishop of Soissons
- Church: Catholic Church
- Diocese: Diocese of Soissons
- In office: 4 May 1739 – 19 July 1764
- Predecessor: Charles-François Lefebvre de Laubrière
- Successor: Henri-Joseph-Claude de Bourdeilles

Orders
- Consecration: 31 May 1739 by Nicolas de Saulx-Tavannes

Personal details
- Born: 9 June 1709 Saint-Germain-en-Laye, Province of Île-de-France, Kingdom of France
- Died: 19 July 1764 (aged 55) Soissons, Province of Île-de-France, Kingdom of France

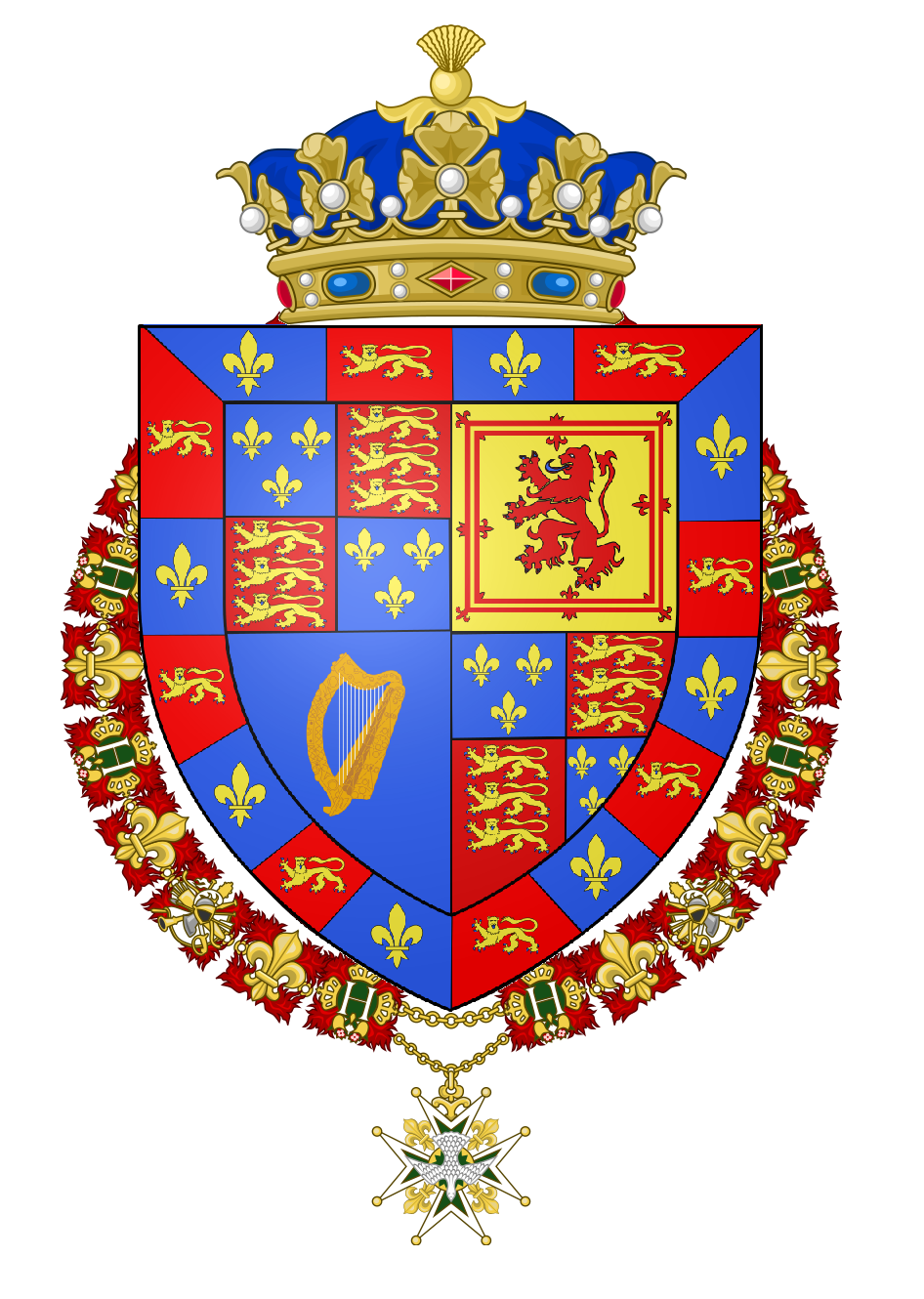
François' arms as Duke of Fitz-James

François de Fitz-James (9 June 1709 – 19 July 1764) was a French-English Roman Catholic bishop and theologian. As a younger son of James FitzJames, 1st Duke of Berwick, he was a member of the junior branch of the House of FitzJames and held the title Duke of Fitz-James from 1721. He was a rigid adherent of the controversial teachings of Jansenism.

== Biography ==
Fitz-James was second son (and third child) of James FitzJames, 1st Duke of Berwick and Anne Bulkeley. His father was the illegitimate son of James II of England by Arabella Churchill. Fitz-James was born at the exiled Stuart court at Château de Saint-Germain-en-Laye near Paris. His elder brother, Henri Jacques de Fitz-James, died in 1721, at which point Fitz-James succeeded as 3rd Duke of Fitz-James.

He renounced his family dignities (other than the title of duke) to enter the clergy at the age of eighteen in 1727, and was appointed abbot of the Abbey of Saint-Victor, Paris in 1728. In 1733 he was ordained as a priest and the following year became Doctor of the University of Paris Faculty of Theology. As a theologian, he was a rigid adherent of Jansenism. In 1736 he resigned his status as a peer of France and in 1738 he was made commendatory abbot of the Abbey of Saint-Georges, Boscherville. Fitz-James was appointed Bishop of Soissons on 31 December 1738, confirmed as bishop on 4 May 1739 and ordained bishop on 31 May 1739.

In June 1742 he succeeded Henri Oswald de La Tour d'Auvergne as first almoner (or chaplain) to Louis XV. It was in this capacity that Fitz-James took the confession of the king when he fell gravely ill at Metz on 8 April 1744. Fitz-James refused to administer last rites to the king as long as his mistress, Marie Anne de Mailly-Nesle, was still in the city. Fearing for his life, the king renounced adultery and dismissed de Mailly-Nesle. Bishop Fitz-James also forced the seriously ill king to publicly apologise for his lifestyle. When the king recovered, Fitz-James was criticised by courtiers for taking the premature confession and de Mailly-Nesle demanded that he be banished from court. Fitz-James was saved by de Mailly-Nesle's death in December 1744. A man of strict morals, he later clashed with Madame de Pompadour and on 6 March 1748 the king directed that Fitz-James should be exiled to his diocese.

In Soissons, Bishop Fitz-James had all episcopal buildings, especially Soissons Cathedral, renovated to a high standard and reorganised the administrative structures, including the establishment of new deaneries. A pastoral letter from 1762, in which Fitz-James called for the suppression of the Jesuits, was officially condemned by Pope Clement XIII on 13 April 1763 and rejected by many French bishops. Fitz-James died at Soissons in 1764. He was succeeded in his title by his younger brother, Charles de Fitz-James, 4th Duke of Fitz-James. After his death, his works were published under the title OEuvres Posthumes. A miniature portrait of Fitz-James as a young man is in the Royal Collection.

French nobility
Previous: Henry James Fitz-James	Duke of Fitz-James; 1721–1764	Next: Charles de Fitz-James
