= Planned French invasion of Britain (1708) =

Part of the War of the Spanish Succession

Planned French Invasion of Britain (1708)
- Part of Jacobite risings and War of the Spanish Succession
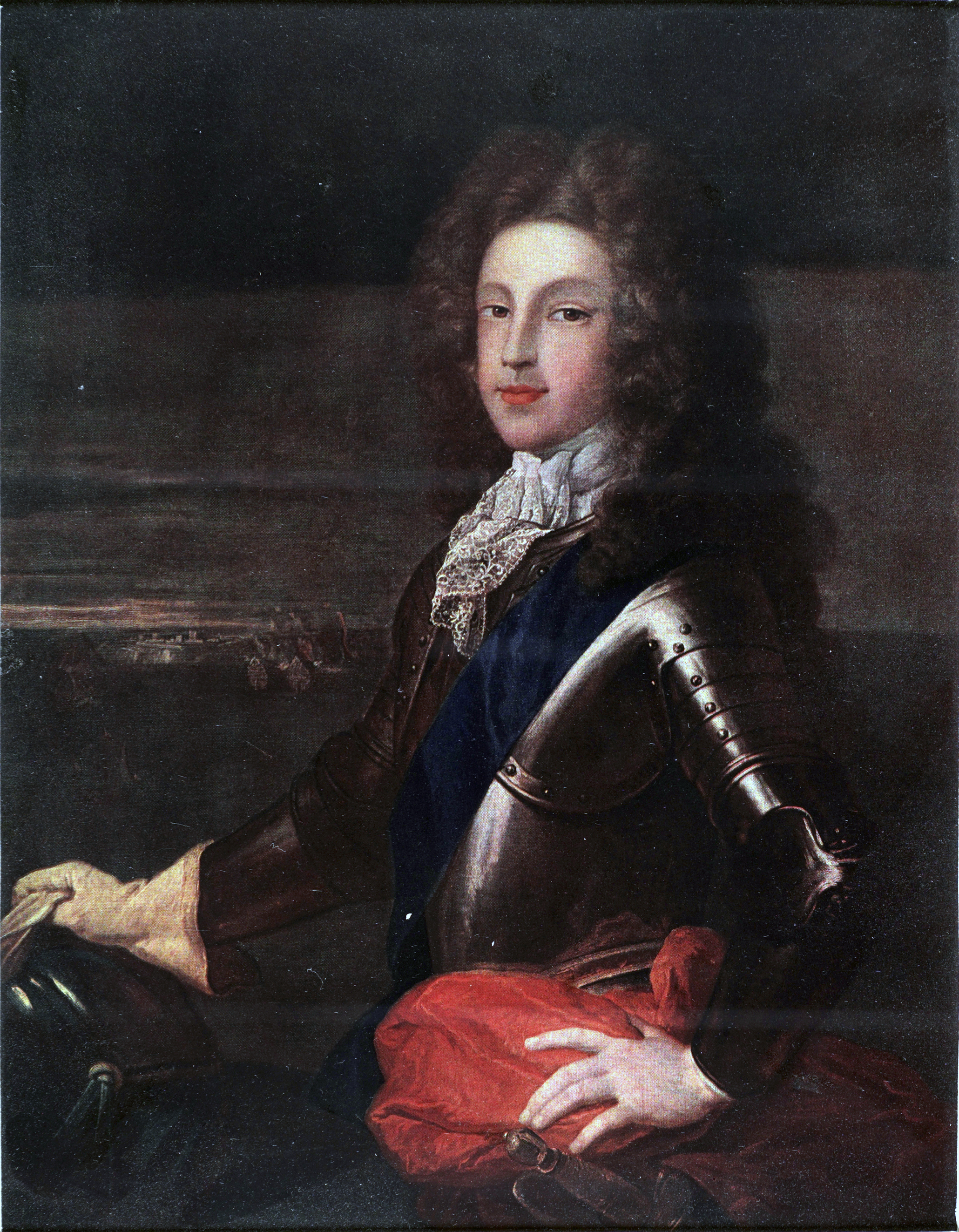
- James Francis Edward Stuart, by unknown artist
Date	March 1708
Location	Scotland
Result	Government victory

Belligerents
(Kingdom of Great Britain) British Government	Jacobites; France

Commanders and leaders
George Byng	James Stuart; Claude de Forbin de Goyon

The Planned French Invasion of Britain (Note: French: Entreprise d’Écosse; IPA: [ɑ̃.tʁə.pʁiz de.kɔs]; lit. 'Scotland Project') was attempted in March 1708 during the War of the Spanish Succession. Hoping to divert British resources from Flanders, a French Navy expedition was ordered to transport 5,000–6,000 soldiers to northeast Scotland. Once landed, they would help local Jacobites restore James Francis Edward Stuart to the throne of Great Britain.

Using a fleet of fast privateers, its commander Claude de Forbin reached Scotland. However, with the Royal Navy in close pursuit, the troops were unable to disembark and he was forced to return home. Lack of French support meant substantive local backing failed to materialise, and the Scottish Jacobites dispersed without significant military action.

== Background ==
Under the 1697 Treaty of Ryswick, Louis XIV of France recognised William III as king of England and Scotland, instead of the exiled James II, who had been deposed by the 1688 Glorious Revolution. The War of the Spanish Succession began in July 1701, and when James died on 16 September, Louis reneged on that commitment and proclaimed James II's son James Francis Edward Stuart as king. William himself died in March 1702 and was succeeded by James's Protestant daughter Anne.

By late 1707, the war had reached a stalemate. Despite victories in Flanders, the Allies had been unable to break French border defences or to place their candidate on the Spanish throne. Both sides attempted to use internal conflicts to break the deadlock. Britain supported the camisard rebels in south-western France, and the Jacobites served a similar function for the French.

Jacobite agent Nathaniel Hooke convinced Louis XIV there was support for a Jacobite rising in Scotland, where the 1707 Union was widely unpopular. At the same time, French privateers had inflicted enormous losses on British maritime trade and the coastal fishing industry. This had a particular impact on Scottish shipping, since the Royal Navy faced multiple demands to escort merchant convoys, and did not consider it a priority. Hooke visited Scotland in 1707, where he met with supporters including the Earl of Erroll, and elderly former Jacobite general Thomas Buchan.

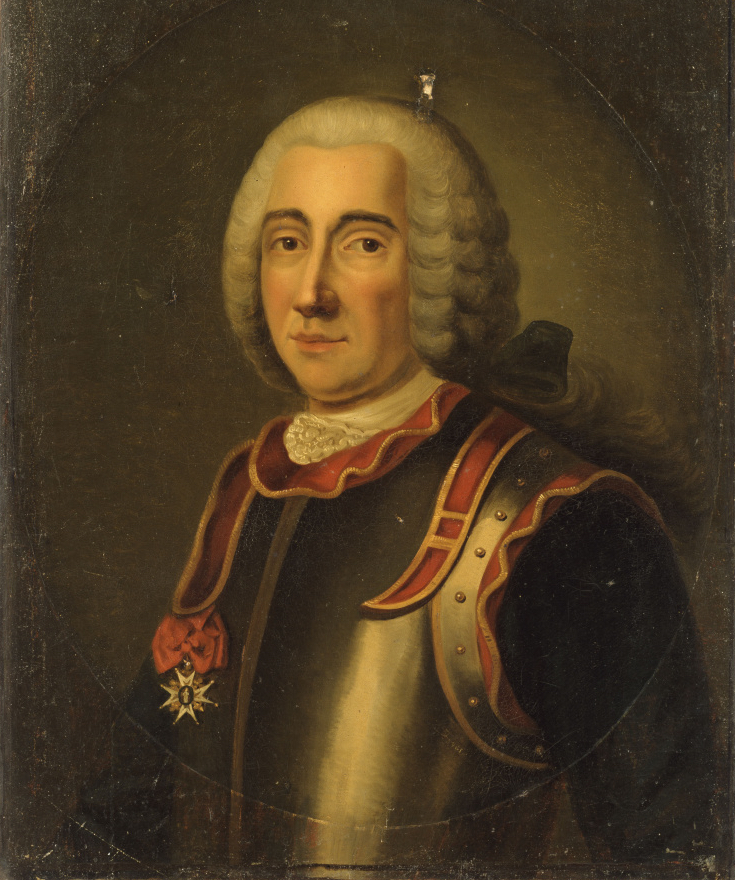
French Admiral Claude de Forbin (1656–1733) had little faith in the expedition from the start.

Senior nobles such as the dukes of Atholl and Hamilton refused to commit, partly because of an attempt in 1703 by Simon Fraser, later Lord Lovat, to implicate them in a Jacobite plot as part of a personal feud. However, Hooke obtained a letter of support signed by Erroll, the Earl of Panmure and six others, promising 25,000 men and requesting 8,000 French troops, weapons, money, artillery, ammunition and "majors, lieutenants, and serjeants to discipline" the Scots army. (Note: As with many other Jacobite plots, assurances of local support proved wildly inaccurate)

John Ker, another Jacobite agent, also claimed backing from Scottish Presbyterian dissidents, arguing they "are persuaded (Union) will...render the Scots slaves to the English". These religious radicals viewed Union as a threat to the Church of Scotland, despite legal safeguards for its independence. Although they appear to have been serious in considering armed rebellion, in reality Ker was a British double agent whose role was to persuade them not to do so.

Nevertheless, in November 1707 Louis decided there was sufficient backing to proceed. Planning began under the supervision of Pontchartrain, who had been involved with previous invasion attempts in 1692 and 1696. Claude de Forbin was appointed commander of the naval squadron, with the Comte de Gacé leading the landing force.

== Expedition ==
As the Royal Navy patrolled exits from French ports along the English Channel, naval operations often took place during the winter months, when wind and tides made it harder to enforce a blockade. However, it also increased risks from the weather; conditions off north-eastern Scotland were well known to French privateers, and de Forbin's biggest concern was lack of a confirmed landing place. He later recorded: "the Minister did not mention any port in a condition to receive us,... or where our fleet might anchor and... troops disembark in safety".

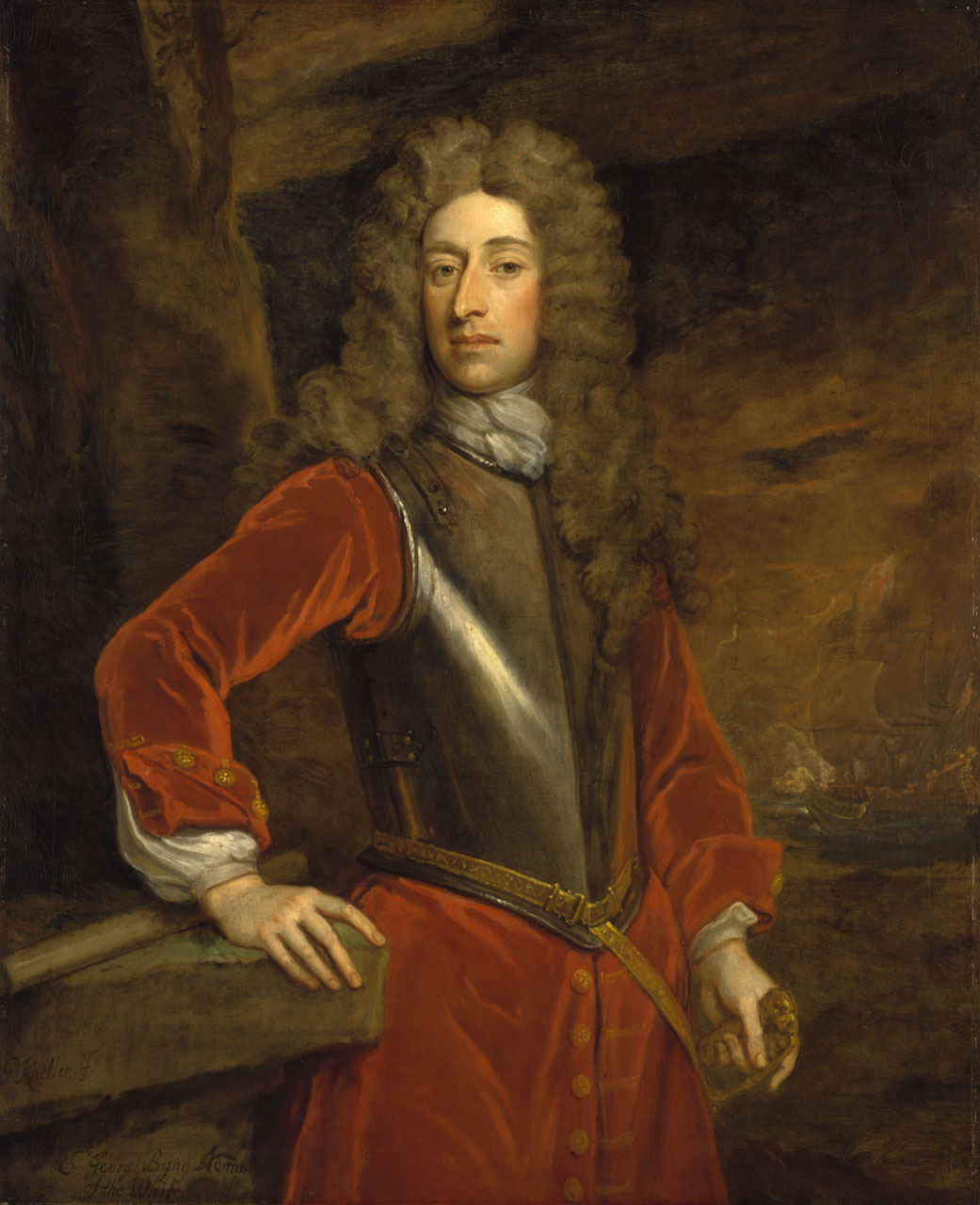
British commander Sir George Byng (1663–1733); ca 1700.

Based on this information, de Forbin told Pontchartrain and Louis XIV the expedition had no chance of success, but planning continued. The fleet assembled at Dunkirk. This had been a major privateer base for centuries, since ships could reach the River Thames in a single tide, allowing them to reach as far north as the Orkney Islands. By the end of February, 5,000–6,000 troops were ready to embark; James himself joined them on 9 March. Its officers included a number of Jacobite exiles, among them Richard Hamilton and Viscount Galmoy.

Rather than slow-moving transports, de Forbin insisted on using a larger number of small but fast privateers, with reduced crews and fewer guns to accommodate the troops. While that improved their chances of avoiding the Royal Navy, they could not hope to win in a naval battle. The British had been monitoring the preparations, and a squadron under Sir George Byng now arrived off the nearby port of Gravelines, preventing the French from departing. As James was ill with measles, the troops were disembarked while he recovered, and after a week Byng was forced to return to England for resupply. As soon as he left, James and the soldiers were reloaded, and on 17 March, 30 privateers and five warships left Dunkirk.

Their departure was immediately delayed by a two-day gale, but this forced Byng to take shelter, enabling the French to make for the Firth of Forth. Rather than following the coastline, de Forbin kept out to sea to avoid being spotted, and ended up north of the proposed landing site. On 25 March, the French anchored near Fife Ness and spent the next day searching for a landing place, allowing Byng to catch up with them. Despite James's protests, the French privateers could not face the British in battle, so they headed north. They spent two days attempting to enter the Moray Firth, but Byng's ships soon spotted the French fleet. During a running sea fight off Montrose, HMS Leopard, commanded by Captain Thomas Gordon, caught and captured the Salisbury. The rest of the French fleet fled and gave up any further attempt to land. Most of them made it back to Dunkirk, although they were pursued by the British around the north of Scotland and the west of Ireland, and sustained severe damage to both ships and men.

Hearing news of the French fleet, some of the Jacobite gentry, including James Stirling of Keir House and four others, gathered at Brig o' Turk. They were arrested, imprisoned in Newgate Prison in London and later transferred to Edinburgh Castle, where they were tried for high treason. They were acquitted of that charge, as the evidence against them proved only that they had drunk to James's health.

== Aftermath ==
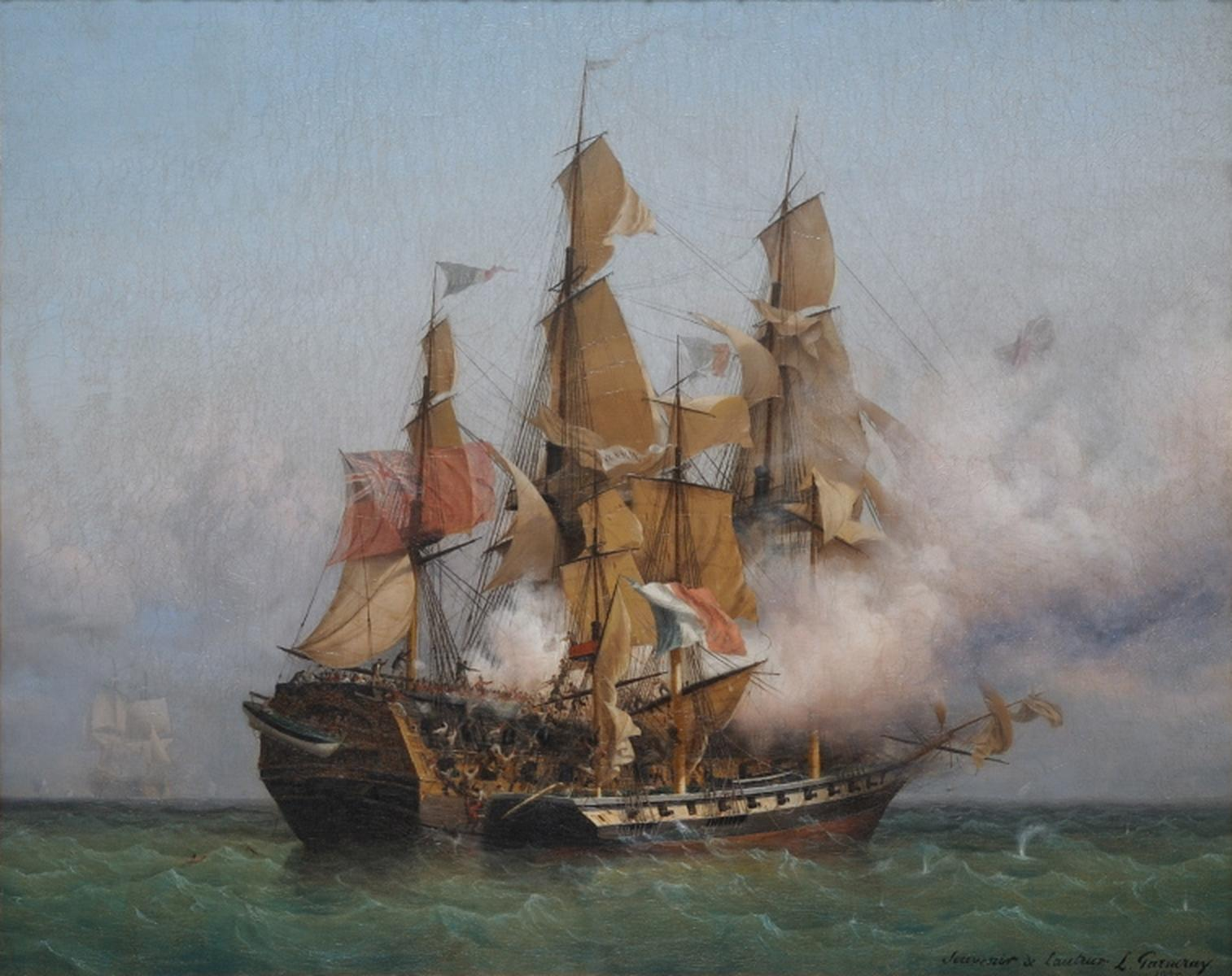
Merchant ship (left), battling a much smaller privateer (right); such vessels formed the bulk of Claude de Forbin's fleet and their size shows why he could not risk a naval battle.

Perceptions of the expedition's value reflect a fundamental divergence of objectives between France and their Jacobite allies. The Stuarts wanted to regain their throne; for the French, they were a useful low-cost means of absorbing British resources, but a Stuart restoration would not change the threat posed by British expansion.

The 1708 attempt was a response to the dire military situation France faced as a result of Marlborough's victories in Flanders. It occupied large elements of the British and Dutch navies for several months, with Byng ordered to remain in Scotland even after its defeat, and troops were diverted from Ireland and southern England. A French army of 110,000 recaptured large parts of the Spanish Netherlands before defeat at Oudenarde on 11 July evicted it once more.

Despite its ultimate defeat, the expedition achieved France's short-term purpose but helped the pro-war Whigs win a majority in the May 1708 general election, the first held after Union. It also damaged the Jacobites, who had failed to launch an effective insurgency in Scotland despite popular opposition to Union. In his overview of the political situation, Hooke concluded that "the country seemed to be fully resolved on peace".

== Sources ==
- Bowie, Karin (2003). "Public Opinion, Popular Politics and the Union of 1707". The Scottish Historical Review. 82 (214): 226–260. doi:10.3366/shr.2003.82.2.226. JSTOR 25529719.
- Bromley, JS (1987). Corsairs and Navies, 1600–1760. Continnuum-3PL. ISBN 978-0907628774.
- Cobbett, William (1828) [1719]. "The Trials of James Stirling of Keir". In Howell, T B (ed.). State Trials. Vol. XIV. Longman.
- Douglas, Hugh (2008). "John Ker, of Kersland; 1673–1726". Oxford Dictionary of National Biography (online ed.). Oxford University Press. doi:10.1093/ref:odnb/15549. (Subscription, Wikipedia Library access or UK public library membership required.)
- Hooke, Nathaniel (1760). Secret History Of Colonel Hoocke's Negotiations In Scotland In Favour Of The Pretender In 1707: Including The Original Letters And Papers Which Passed Versailles And St. Germains (2011 ed.). Nabu. ISBN 978-1247343648.
- Hopkins, Paul (2004). "Buchan, Thomas; 1641–1724". Oxford Dictionary of National Biography (online ed.). Oxford University Press. doi:10.1093/ref:odnb/3827. (Subscription, Wikipedia Library access or UK public library membership required.)
- Lenman, Bruce (1980). The Jacobite risings in Britain 1689–1746. London: Eyre Methuen. ISBN 978-0413396501.
- Lord, Evelyn (2004). The Stuarts' Secret Army. Pearson. ISBN 978-0582772564.
- HMSO (1708). "Lord High Admiral's Answer to the Report of the Committee, upon the Petition of the Merchants complaining of Losses for Want of Cruiz rs and Convoys". Journal of the House of Lords. 18.
- Luttrell, Narcissus (1857). A Brief Historical Relation of State Affairs from September 1678 to April 1714. Vol. VI. Oxford: Oxford University Press. – 1705 to 1714
- Macinnes, AI (October 1984). "Jacobitism". History Today. 34 (10).
- Mitchell, John Oswald (1905). Old Glasgow essays. J Maclehose.
- Owen, John Hely (1938). War at Sea Under Queen Anne 1702–1708 (2010 ed.). Cambridge University Press. ISBN 978-1108013383.
- Sinclair-Stevenson, Christopher (April 1971). "The Jacobite Expedition of 1708". History Today. 21 (4).
- Szechi, Daniel (1994). The Jacobites: Britain and Europe, 1688–1788. Manchester University Press. ISBN 978-0719037740.
- Whatley, Christopher (2011). Scottish Society, 1707–1830: Beyond Jacobitism, Towards Industrialisation. Manchester University Press. ISBN 978-0719045400.
- Williams, Neville E (1960). The Eighteenth-Century Constitution 1688–1815: Documents and Commentary (2009 ed.). Cambridge University Press. ISBN 9780521091237.
