= Duke of Fitz-James =

French royal title

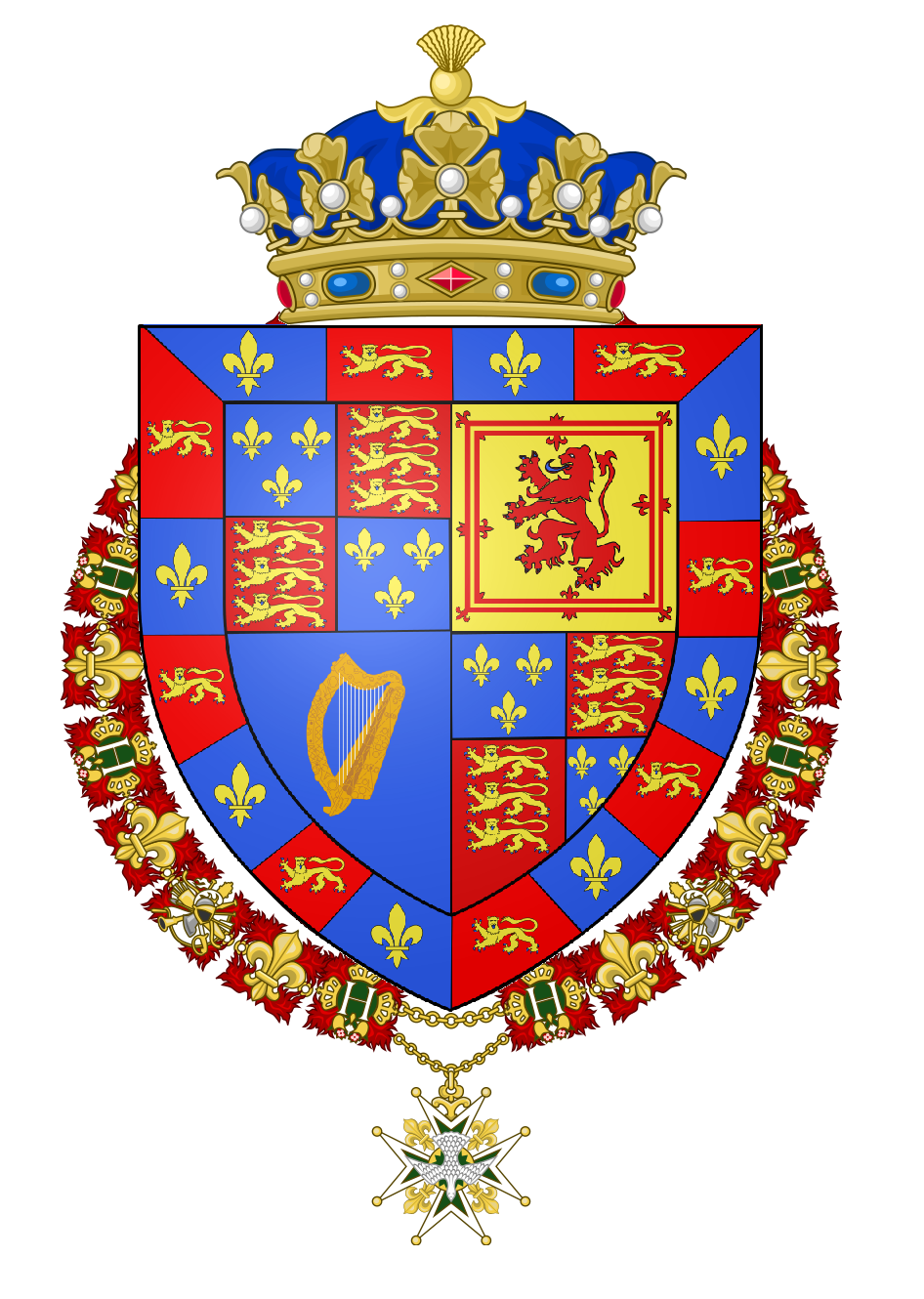
Arms of Dukes of Fitz-James in the French peerage

Duke of Fitz-James (French: duc de Fitz-James) was a title of nobility in the peerage of France. It was created by King Louis XIV in 1710 for James FitzJames, 1st Duke of Berwick, an illegitimate son of the exiled King James II of England, whose family had settled at the French court.

This title was used by the junior branch of the House of FitzJames. The title became extinct in 1967 upon the death of Jacques de Fitz-James, 10th Duke of Fitz-James (1886–1967).

== List of dukes of Fitz-James since 1710 ==
From	To	Duke of Fitz-James	Relationship to predecessor
1710	1718	James FitzJames, 1st Duke of Berwick (1670–1734)	First Duke of Fitz-James, illegitimate son of James II of England
1718	1721	Henry James Fitz-James, 2nd Duke of Fitz-James (1700–1721)	Son of James FitzJames
1721	1764	François de Fitz-James (1709–1764)	Brother of Henry James Fitz-James
1764	1787	Charles de Fitz-James (1712–1787)	Brother of Henry James Fitz-James
1787	1805	Jacques Charles de Fitz-James (1743–1805)	Son of Charles de Fitz-James
1805	1838	Édouard de Fitz-James (1776–1838)	Son of Jacques Charles de Fitz-James
1838	1846	Jacques Marie Emmanuel de Fitz-James (1803–1846)	Son of Édouard de Fitz-James
1846	1906	Édouard Antoine Sidoine de Fitz-James (1828–1906)	Son of Jacques Marie Emmanuel de Fitz-James
1906	1944	Jacques Gustave Sidoine de Fitz-James (1852–1944)	Son of Édouard Antoine Sidoine de Fitz-James
1944	1967	Jacques de Fitzjames (1886–1967)	Cousin of Jacques Gustave Sidoine de Fitz-James
