= Quevillon =

- Commune
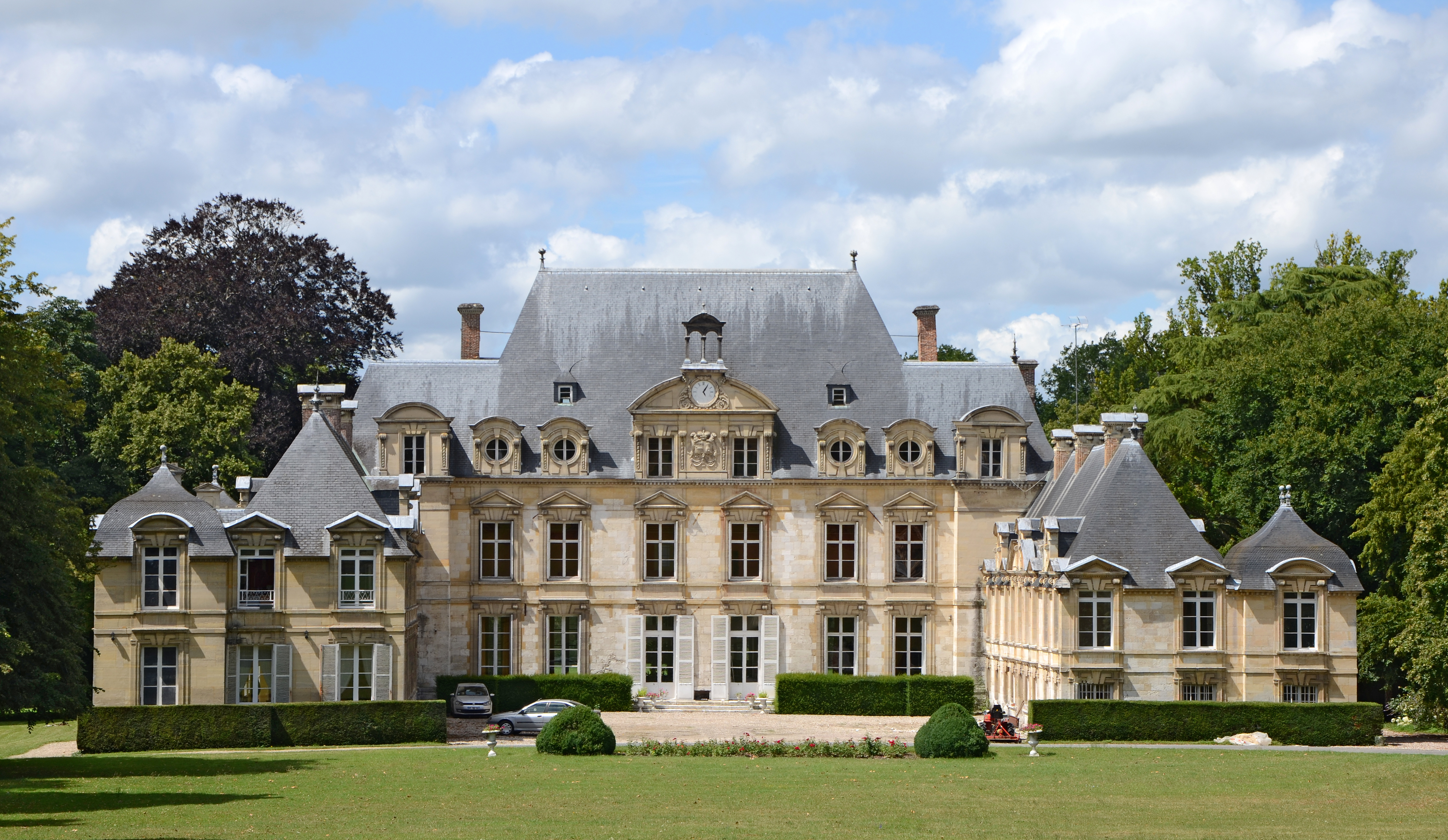
- The Château de La Rivière-Bourdet
- Location of Quevillon
- Location within France Location within Normandy
- Coordinates: 49°25′12″N 0°57′15″E
- Country: France
- Region: Normandy
- Department: Seine-Maritime
- Arrondissement: Rouen
- Canton: Barentin
- Intercommunality: Métropole Rouen Normandie

Government
  - Mayor (2026–32): Fabien Quesne
- Area^{1}: 11.23 km^{2} (4.34 sq mi)
- Elevation: 5 m (16 ft)
- Highest elevation: 118 m (387 ft)
- Lowest elevation: 2 m (6.6 ft)
- Population (2023): 587
  - Density: 52.3/km^{2} (135/sq mi)
- Time zone: UTC+01:00 (CET)
  - Summer (DST): UTC+02:00 (CEST)
- INSEE/Postal code: 76513 /76840
- ^{1} French Land Register data, which excludes lakes, ponds, glaciers > 1 km^{2} (0.386 sq mi or 247 acres) and river estuaries.

Quevillon (pronounced [kəvijɔ̃]) is a commune in the Seine-Maritime department in the Normandy region in northern France.

== Geography ==
A forestry and farming village situated in a meander of the river Seine, some 5 miles (8.0 km) west of Rouen at the junction of the D67 and the D267 roads.

== Population ==
Historical population
Year	Pop.	±% p.a.
1968	329	—
1975	436	+4.10%
1982	506	+2.15%
1990	523	+0.41%
1999	533	+0.21%
2007	613	+1.76%
2012	596	−0.56%
2017	598	+0.07%
2023	587	−0.31%
Source: INSEE

== Places of interest ==
- The church of St.Martin, dating from the nineteenth century.
- The chapel of Saint-Jean, dating from the seventeenth century.
- The seventeenth century Château de La Rivière-Bourdet, with the chapel of Saint-Clotilde and a dovecote.
- A stone cross in the cemetery, erected in 1600.

== See also ==
- Communes of the Seine-Maritime department
