= Siege of Philippsburg (1734) =

1734 siege

Coordinates: 49°14′12″N 8°27′15″E

- Part of the War of the Polish Succession
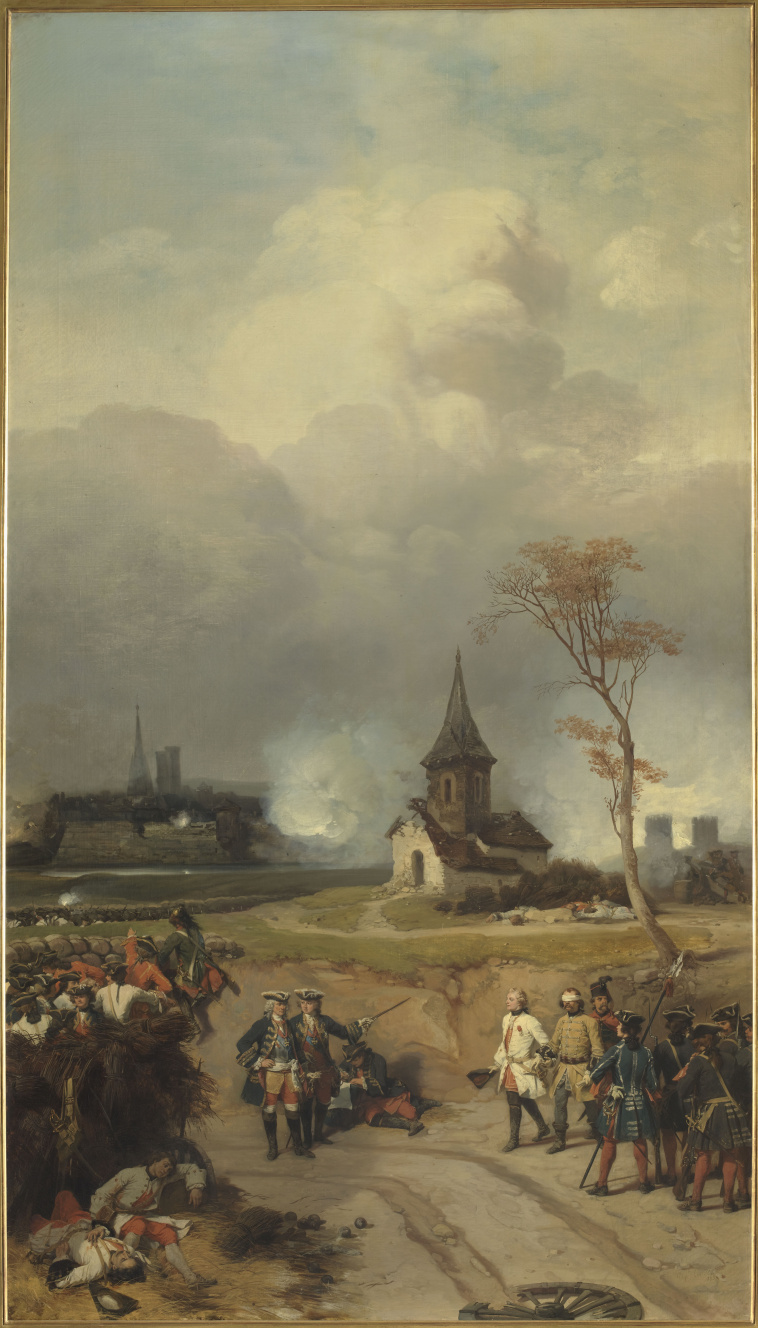
- Capture of Philippsburg by the Marshals Asfeld and Noailles (Adrien Maurice) on July 18, 1734 (1838 painting by Louis Charles Auguste Couder)
Date	26 May – 18 July 1734 (1 month, 3 weeks and 1 day)
Location	Philippsburg, near Karlsruhe, Germany
Result	French victory

Belligerents
Kingdom of France	Holy Roman Empire

Commanders and leaders
Duke of Berwick †; Marquis d'Asfeld; Duke of Noailles	Gottfried Ernst von Wuttgenau (garrison); Prince Eugene of Savoy (relief army)

Strength
60,000	4,200 (garrison); 70,000 (relief army)

Casualties and losses
Unknown	337 killed 359 wounded 321 captured or deserted

The siege of Philippsburg was conducted by French forces against troops of the Holy Roman Empire in the fortress of Philippsburg in the Rhine River valley during the War of the Polish Succession. The Duke of Berwick led 100,000 men up the Rhine Valley, of which 60,000 were detached to invest the fortress at Philippsburg, beginning on 26 May 1734. An Imperial relief army of 70,000 under the aging Prince Eugene of Savoy (accompanied by Crown Prince Frederick of Prussia) was unsuccessful in actually relieving the siege. On 12 June Berwick was killed by a cannonball while inspecting the trenches, and command of the besiegers fell to Marshals d'Asfeld and Noailles. The fortress surrendered one month later, and the garrison withdrew to the fortress of Mainz with the honours of war.

D'Asfeld was promoted to Marshal of France for his role in the campaign; Wuttgenau was promoted to lieutenant general for his spirited defense of the fortress.

== Background ==
On the death of Augustus II on 1 February 1733, the Polish throne was claimed by both his son, Augustus III, and by Stanislas I, father in law of King Louis XV. Whilst a body double ostensibly left Brest by sea, Stanislas crossed Germany incognito and arrived at Warsaw on 8 September. On 12 September Stanislas was elected king of Poland by the diet.

On his election Russia and Austria, both of whom backed Augustus III, invaded Poland. By 22 September Stanislas, who did not have a proper army, had to take refuge in Danzig (now known as Gdańsk), there to await the French help he had been promised. On 5 October, Augustus III was proclaimed king, protected by Russian forces at Warsaw. Great Britain, the Dutch Republic, Sweden, Denmark and the Republic of Venice recognised that Austro-Russian aggression against Poland was the casus belli and pledged to remain neutral. Spain, coveting the Kingdom of Naples and Sardinia, which the Duke of Milan wanted, sided with France.

Louis XV's courtiers (including the princes of Conti and Eu, the counts of Clermont, Charolais and Belle-Isle, the duc de Richelieu, but also Maurice de Saxe, Augustus III's half-brother and the former lover of Anna Ivanovna, now the tsarina of Russia) joined up under marshal James FitzJames, Duke of Berwick to form an army for invading the Rhineland with the objectives of gaining the Duchy of Lorraine and distracting Austria from events in Poland.

In the fall of 1733 the French army crossed the Rhine and besieged Kehl, near Strasbourg. Although they captured and occupied the fortress, most of the army was withdrawn to the west bank of the Rhine due to the onset of winter in December. During the winter, Austrian field marshal Prince Eugene of Savoy began gathering forces of the empire at a camp near Heilbronn to oppose the French. By the spring of 1734 these forces were still significantly smaller than those of France, which had nearly 70,000 men in the field.

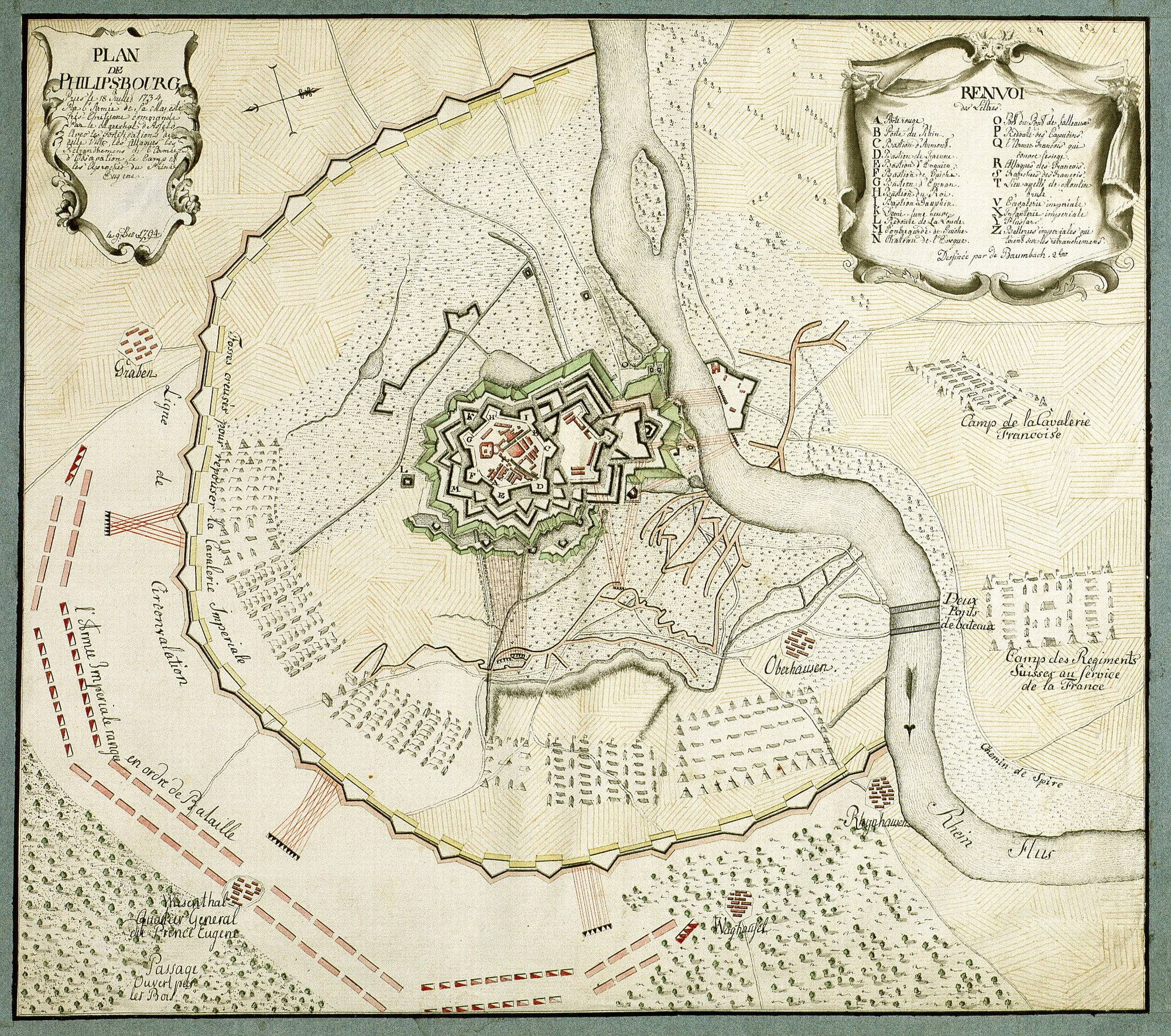
a 1734 French map depicting the siege positions

Freiherr Gottfried Ernst von Wuttgenau was given command of the fortress at Philippsburg in December 1733. The fortress was in deplorable condition, and its moat had in places been filled to the point where the ramparts could easily be approached. He focused defensive preparations on the fortress' flood controls, a significant defense against besiegers who were required to work in the swampy terrain below the fortress, while his engineer, Gerhard Cornelius von Walrave, directed repairs and improvements to the fortress' eastern works, where attacks had been focused in the past. By the spring of 1734 these preparations were largely complete, although the garrison was short of ammunition and experienced artillery personnel and engineers. The defenders consisted of a battalion of Walseggers, companies from the Kaiser's regiments of Württemberg, Max Hessen, Kettler, Müfflingen, Sachsen-Gotha, Wolfenbüttel, Walsegg, and Bevern, the Frankish Höltzl regiment, and companies from the Frankish Bassewitz and Heller regiments.

== Siege ==
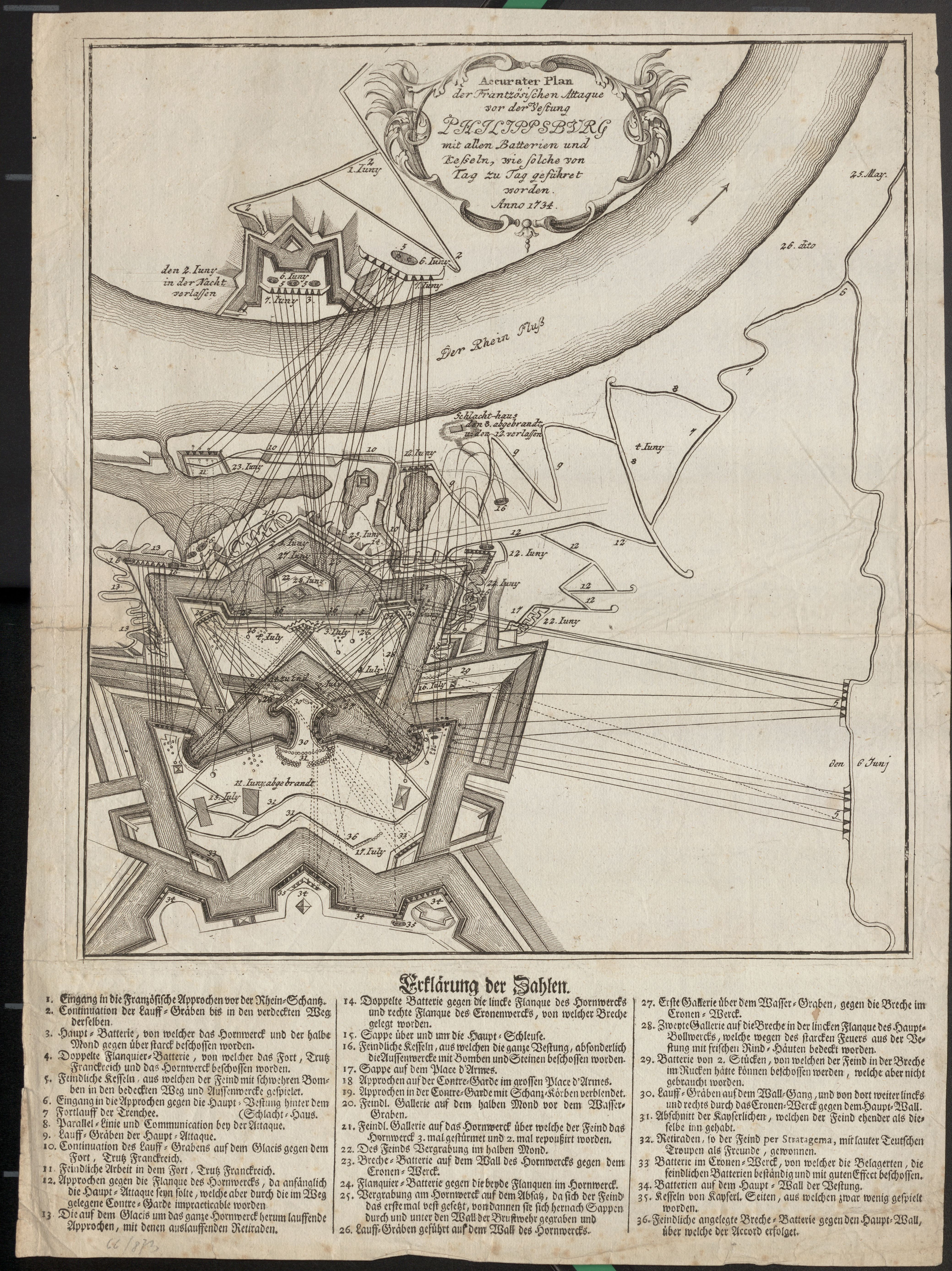
Representation of the bullet trajectories 1734

In late May 1734, the French began surrounding the fortress at Philippsburg. A total of 46 battalions were deployed, with 14 on the left bank of the Rhine, and the balance on the right bank, cutting the land approaches to the fortress. Of the troops on the right bank, half were dedicated to the siege, while the rest were detailed to defend the siege camp against any attempts to relieve the siege. On 26 May they began digging the outer trench surrounding the fortress with a complement of 12,000 men.

The siege works progressed under Berwick until 12 June, when he was felled by a lucky shot while examining siege works at a forward position. Command of the besieging army then came to d'Asfeld. On 19 June Eugene, under orders from the Kaiser, began moving his army, which had since grown to over 70,000 men, toward Philippsburg with the goal of relieving the siege. On 27 June the army reached Bruchsal. D'Asfeld responded by building additional boat-bridges over the Rhine to speed the movement of cavalry across the river, and redirected some of the siege personnel to face Eugene's threat. The French position was further inconvenienced when heavy rains on 5 July caused portions of their position to be flooded. Despite these difficulties, Eugene failed to act decisively to capitalize on the situation, and withdrew his army.

By 17 July the French had penetrated the fortress' defenses to its inner moat, and were threatening the heart of the fortress. After failing to establish contact with Eugene, Wuttgenau and d'Asfeld agreed to terms of capitulation early on 18 July.
