= Siege of Kehl (1733) =

1733 during the War of the Polish Succession

Coordinates: 48°34′N 7°49′E

- Part of the War of the Polish Succession
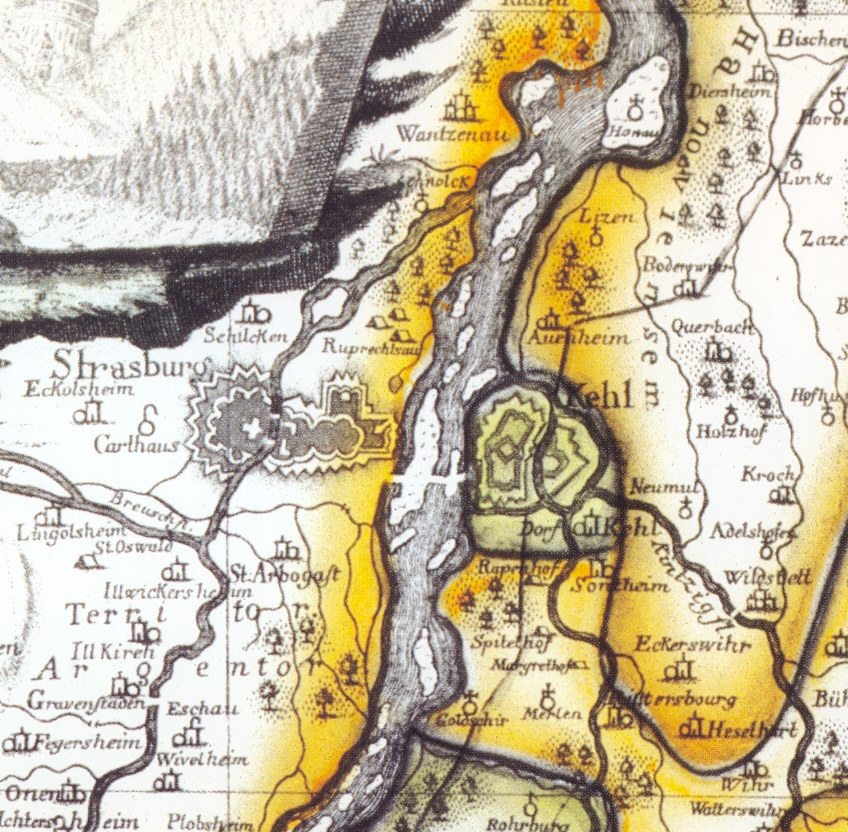
- A 1788 map showing Kehl and Strasbourg
Date	14–28 October 1733
Location	Kehl, Margraviate of Baden (present-day Baden-Württemberg, Germany)
Result	French victory

Belligerents
Kingdom of France	Holy Roman Empire

Commanders and leaders
James FitzJames, 1st Duke of Berwick	Baron Johann August von Phull

Strength
25,000 infantry 8,000 cavalry	250 Imperial troops 1,200 Schwabian militia

The siege of Kehl (14–28 October 1733) was one of the opening moves of the French Rhineland campaign in the War of the Polish Succession, at the fortress town of Kehl in the upper Rhine River valley in the Holy Roman Empire. A large French army under the command of the Duke of Berwick besieged and captured the fortress, which was lightly garrisoned and in poor condition.

== Context ==
On the death of Augustus II on 1 February 1733, the Polish throne was claimed by both his son, Augustus III, and by Stanislas I, father in law of Louis XV. Whilst a body double ostensibly left Brest by sea, Stanilas crossed Germany incognito and arrived at Warsaw on 8 September. On 12 September Stanislas was elected king of Poland by the diet.

On his election Russia and Austria (backing Augustus III) invaded Poland. By 22 September Stanislas, who did not have a proper army, had to take refuge in Danzig (now known as Gdańsk), there to await the French help he had been promised. On 5 October, Augustus III was proclaimed king under protection from Russian forces at Warsaw. Great Britain, the Dutch Republic, Sweden, Denmark and the Republic of Venice recognised that Austro-Russian aggression against Poland was the casus belli and pledged to remain neutral. Spain, coveting the Kingdom of Naples and Sardinia, which coveted the Duchy of Milan, sided with France.

Louis XV's courtiers (including the princes of Conti and Eu, the counts of Clermont, Charolais and Belle-Isle, the duc de Richelieu, but also Maurice de Saxe, Augustus III's half-brother and the former lover of Anna Ivanovna, now the tsarina of Russia) joined up under marshal James FitzJames to form an army for invading the Rhineland with the objective of distracting Austria from events in Poland and gaining the Duchy of Lorraine.

== Prelude ==
The village and fortress of Kehl was located near the Margraviate of Baden in the Holy Roman Empire, just across the Rhine River from the French city of Strasbourg. The fortress at Kehl, and that at Philippsburg to the north, provided strategic military control over major crossings of the upper Rhine, which formed the boundary between French-controlled Alsace and the various principalities of the empire.

Nominally the responsibility of the emperor, maintenance and defense of the fortress belonged to the Swabian Circle, which was largely dominated by the Duchy of Württemberg. Although some imperial troops were stationed there in January 1733, the commander of the fortress was the Württembergian lieutenant general Baron Johann August von Phull, and most of its garrison consisted of Swabian troops. When the war broke out, numerous works to repair and expand the fortress were underway, but key defenses near the Rhine were incomplete.

On 12 October, French troops under Belle-Isle and Silly marched into the Duchy of Lorraine and seized its capital, Nancy. Control over the remainder of Lorraine was rapidly established, and the two commanders left garrisons throughout the duchy before sending the bulk of their forces into Alsace to focus on the campaign on the Rhine.

Also on 12 October, Berwick ordered troops from the Strasbourg encampment to cross the Rhine. At a point near Auenheim, about 4 kilometres (2.5 mi) below Kehl, they constructed a ship bridge and crossed 4,000 men to the east bank. Near Goldscheuer, 7 kilometres (4.3 mi) above the fortress, they began constructing another bridge. Two days later, the bulk of the Berwick's army had crossed the Rhine. General Phull, when the French began their movements, destroyed the bridge between Kehl and Strasbourg, and also destroyed those houses and other buildings outside the fortress that might provide the attacking French any sort of shelter.

== Siege ==
Berwick first ordered the construction of a line of circumvallation. Local villagers were among those pressed into service for its construction, which was anchored at both ends by the Rhine, above and below the fortress. Berwick's quartermasters also made demands to the surrounding villages for the delivery of provisions to the besiegers. The Duke of Württemberg signed a supply agreement that he characterized in reports to the emperor as being concluded under the greatest duress.

By 17 October Berwick was ready to begin digging siege lines, and it became apparent to Phull that the fortress' river-facing hornwork was Berwick's target when the latter began construction of batteries on the island between Kehl and Strasbourg. On 18 October Phull issued detailed instructions to his commanders concerning the tactics of defense and retreat. The hornwork was to be held until it was either breached or its artillery rendered useless, at which point the defenders were to fall back first to the covered way between the hornwork and the main fortress, and then to the fortress proper.

The French began digging siege trenches on the night of 19 October. By 21 October the siege lines reached an unfinished lunette on the Rhine-facing side of the fortress, and the French began setting up a battery there on 23 October. The defenders were by this time reduced to musket fire and grenades, as most of their artillery had been dismounted or destroyed by enemy fire.

On 23 October the French opened fire not only on the hornwork, but also began battering the walls of the main fortress with cannon fire. After two failed assaults by Berwick's grenadiers, they succeeded in briefly occupying the hornwork; it was reoccupied by the Germans the next day. The defenders attempted a sortie against the French positions near the hornwork, but it was repulsed. By 27 October, the French had established numerous batteries and were mercilessly battering the main fortification. About 4 pm on 28 October, the French barrage started a fire on the hornwork that was severe enough that its commander requested permission from Phull to withdraw; this permission was granted. Phull then held a council, in which it was determined that only 500 men were combat-ready, and that the fortress might hold out at most three more days. Consequently, Phull raised the white flag around 8 pm on 28 October.

The garrison marched out of the fortress on 31 October with the full honors of war, and was escorted to the imperial defense line at Ettlingen.

== Aftermath ==
The onset of bad weather ended the French campaign for the year, and Berwick, after consolidating his control over the area, quartered his troops for the winter on the French side of the Rhine. In 1734 Berwick continued the campaign down the Rhine, successfully flanking the Imperial defense line at Ettlingen, and continuing with the siege of Philippsburg, during which he was killed by a shell. That siege was successfully concluded by his second in command, the marquis d'Asfeld, and marked the end of significant military operations in the Rhine valley for the war. Pursuant to the 1738 Treaty of Vienna that ended the war, France eventually withdrew from Kehl and Philippsburg, but eventually annexed Lorraine.

== See also ==
- Jean Thurel

== Sources ==
- (in French) Histoire philosophique du règne de Louis XV - Page 374 - de Hervé de Tocqueville - 1847
- The New Monthly Magazine
- (in German) History of Austrian Battles
- (in German) Jahrbücher für die Deutschen Armee und Marine, Volume 79 A fairly detailed account of the French conduct of the siege
- (in French) Articles of capitulation
