= James FitzJames, 1st Duke of Berwick =

French-English army officer (1670–1734)

His Grace The Duke of Berwick KG
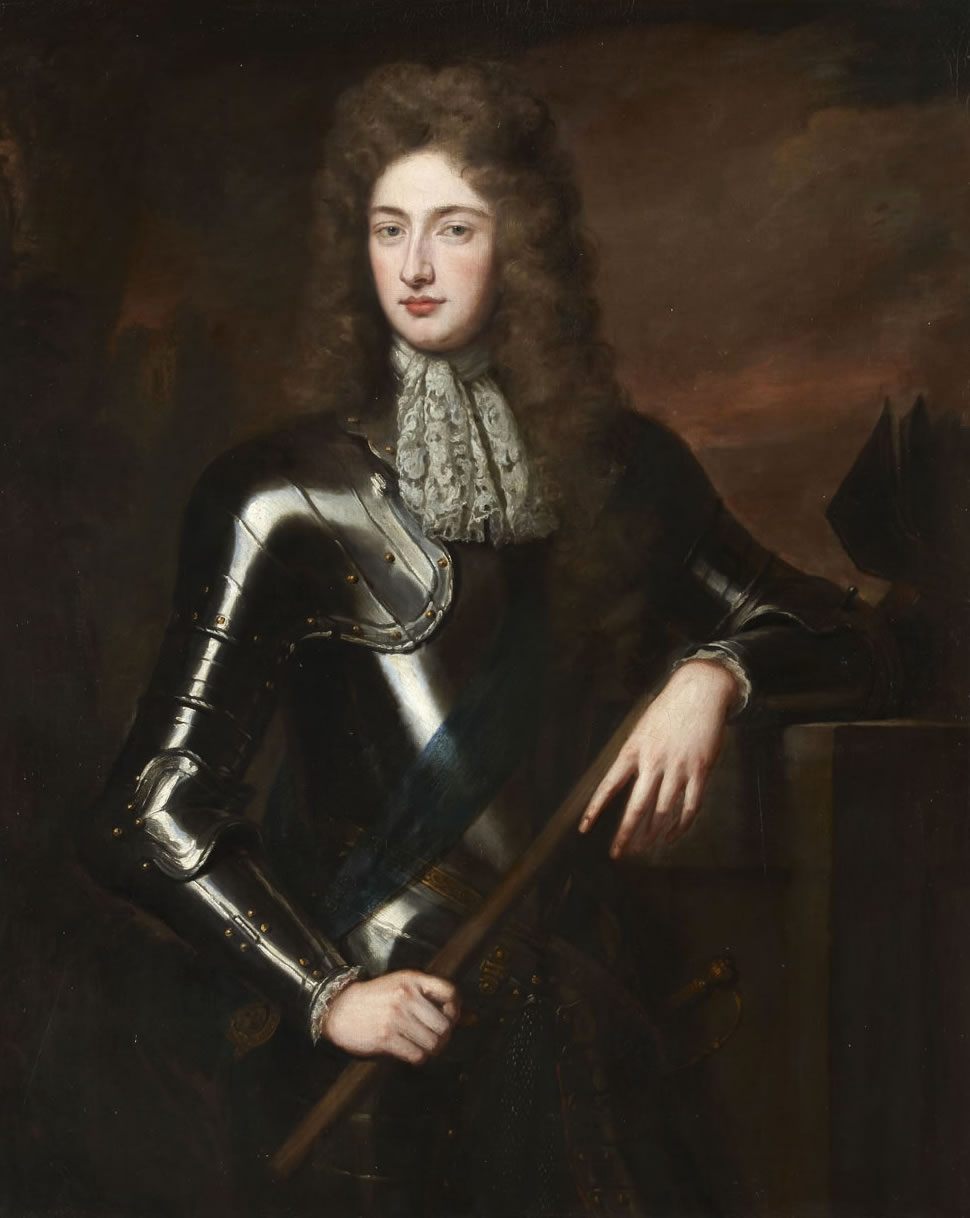

Duke of Berwick
- Period: 1687–1734
- Successor: James Fitz-James Stuart
- Born: 21 August 1670; Moulins, Bourbonnais, France
- Died: 12 June 1734 (aged 63); Philippsburg, Baden, Holy Roman Empire
- Noble family: FitzJames
- Spouses: Lady Honora de Burgh (m. 1695; died 1698) Anne Bulkeley (m. 1700)
- Issue: James Fitz-James Stuart, 2nd Duke of Berwick; Henry James FitzJames, 2nd Duke of FitzJames; John William FitzJames Stewart, Col; Henriette de FitzJames; François de Fitz-James, 3rd Duke of FitzJames; Henry FitzJames; Charles de FitzJames, 4th Duke of FitzJames; Laure Anne de FitzJames; Marie Emilie de FitzJames; Edouard de FitzJames; Anne Sophie de FitzJames; Anne de FitzJames
- Father: James II of England
- Mother: Arabella Churchill
- Military career
- Allegiance: England (before 1688); Jacobites; Kingdom of France
- Rank: Marshal of France
- Conflicts: Great Turkish War; Siege of Buda; Battle of Mohács; Nine Years' War; Invasion of England; Siege of Derry; Battle of Cavan; Battle of the Boyne; Battle of Aughrim; Siege of Cork; Battle of Steenkerque; Battle of Landen; War of the Spanish Succession; Assault on Nijmegen; Battle of Ekeren; Battle of Almanza; Siege of Lille; Siege of Barcelona; War of the Quadruple Alliance; Siege of San Sebastián; War of the Polish Succession; Siege of Kehl; Siege of Philippsburg †

Arms of Dukes of Fitz-James in the Jacobite peerage

James FitzJames, 1st Duke of Berwick, 1st Duke of Liria and Jérica, 1st Duke of Fitz-James (21 August 1670 – 12 June 1734) was a French-English army officer who was the eldest illegitimate son of James II of England by Arabella Churchill, the sister of John Churchill, 1st Duke of Marlborough. Born and raised in France, Berwick was a senior Jacobite commander in his father's army during the Williamite War in Ireland. He subsequently became a successful general in the service of Louis XIV and in 1706 he was made a Marshal of France. Berwick was honored with noble titles from the kings of both France and Spain, in addition to his English ducal title which was attainted in 1695. He was decapitated by a cannonball during the Siege of Philippsburg in 1734.

== Early life ==
FitzJames was born at Moulins in France before his father's accession to the throne, and was brought up in France as a Catholic. He was the son of James and his mistress Arabella Churchill, sister of the English captain general and statesman John Churchill, 1st Duke of Marlborough. He seems to have inherited or perfected the same military ability as his uncle, Marlborough. He was educated at the Stuarts' expense in the College of Juilly, the Collège du Plessis, and the Jesuit College of La Flèche. He went into the service of Charles V, Duke of Lorraine, and was present at the Siege of Buda (1686). FitzJames was created Duke of Berwick, Earl of Tinmouth and Baron Bosworth by his father in 1687. He then returned to Hungary and participated at the Battle of Mohács.

Berwick returned to England and was made Governor of Portsmouth. King James made him a Knight of the Order of the Garter and appointed him Colonel of The Blues to replace the Protestant Aubrey de Vere, 20th Earl of Oxford. The post had been coveted by his maternal uncle the Duke of Marlborough, but FitzJames was earmarked for command, as Catholics replaced Anglicans. However, due to the invasion of the Prince of Orange and the subsequent Glorious Revolution, the installation never took place. Berwick in all conscience could not remain as the Colonel of The Blues' Troop he had served since 1682; he refused to betray his old patronne. Officers were required to answer 'three questions' designed by the King to test their loyalty. Berwick was with his father at Salisbury in November 1688, when key units deserted to the Prince of Orange. King James II was overthrown in December 1688 and fled to France, and Berwick went into exile with him.

In 1689 Berwick accompanied his father to Ireland and fought in the Irish campaign at the Siege of Derry, the Battle of Cavan and the Battle of the Boyne during which he led a charge, was unhorsed and almost killed in the melee. When his father departed for France after the Boyne, Berwick remained with the Jacobite Irish Army during the retreat to Limerick.

On 2 August he was one of the generals, with Patrick Sarsfield and Boisselau, who shored up the defences at Limerick awaiting the Williamite assault; thereafter they rode north across the Shannon with a few Guards. On 22 June 1691, Berwick was with the French general Charles Chalmot de Saint-Ruhe, at Aughrim, a site of his choosing when General de Ginkel appeared over the hill with a superior force of 18,000 Williamites. The defenders were surrounded on one side by peat bog, and on the other Kilcommodon Hill. Berwick was with Sarsfield's corps on the Irish right, who had an uncommitted reserve, when The Blues smashed through the Irish lines on the left, broke the Irish Dragoons, and caused a general panic to ensue. General St Ruhe was decapitated by a stray cannonball, but Sarsfield was too late to rescue the situation. He retired with Berwick to the relative safety of Limerick, which de Ginkel besieged on 25 August. Under the terms of Treaty of Limerick, signed on 3 October, all Irish contingents were banished to the continent forever. These soldiers became known as the Wild Geese. James II created Berwick Colonel of the 1st Troop, Wild Geese. Berwick arrived too late at the siege of Cork with 4,000 French troops, but unable to effect a result, he withdrew; Marlborough marched west to Kinsale to deal with 18,000 Frenchmen. It was at this time that he undertook a number of secret visits to England on behalf of the Jacobite cause.

== In the service of Louis XIV ==
After his father's final exile, Berwick served in the French army under Marshal François-Henri de Montmorency, duc de Luxembourg, including at the battles of Steenkerque. Luxembourg fell into William's trap set against superior numbers, but reinforcements failed the Allies, and the French rallied to send the Maison Militaire du Roi infantry downhill. Berwick was in the charge of the division that broke English lines. They were driven from the field with heavy losses. Berwick was one of Luxembourg's principal officers, and in 1694 commanded the centre of a large French army. After several forced marches to entrap William, they crossed the Meuse again before stopping them near Neerwinden. Berwick struggled against the Foot Guards, who forced his men to retreat in the Landen. He was taken prisoner by his uncle, Charles Churchill, and ransomed for 30,000 florins; and later was exchanged for the wounded James Butler, 2nd Duke of Ormonde. The Irish peer was accused of allowing himself to fall into enemy hands. The scandal swept Whitehall Palace causing angry questions in Parliament.

At the same time a huge number of 400 ships bound for the Smyrna Convoy were taken by the French. Because of his support for his father and service in the French army against England, he was attainted in 1695 by Act of Parliament rendering his British peerages forfeit.

As a soldier, Berwick was highly esteemed for his courage, abilities and integrity. But when his uncle, Marlborough, challenged the French to fight at Liege, Louis-François de Boufflers retreated. In 1703 he took part in the Battle of Ekeren. In June 1704, Berwick commanded a combined Franco-Spanish army, but they did not seriously challenge the enemy, only taking a few of the Barrier Fortresses. By July 1706 Berwick had established increasing dominance in the north of Spain as the Bourbons' premier general. In August partisans forced the Earl of Galway to evacuate Madrid allowing Berwick into winter quarters. As a result of distinguished service in the War of the Spanish Succession, he became a French subject and was appointed a Marshal of France after his successful expedition against Nice in 1706.

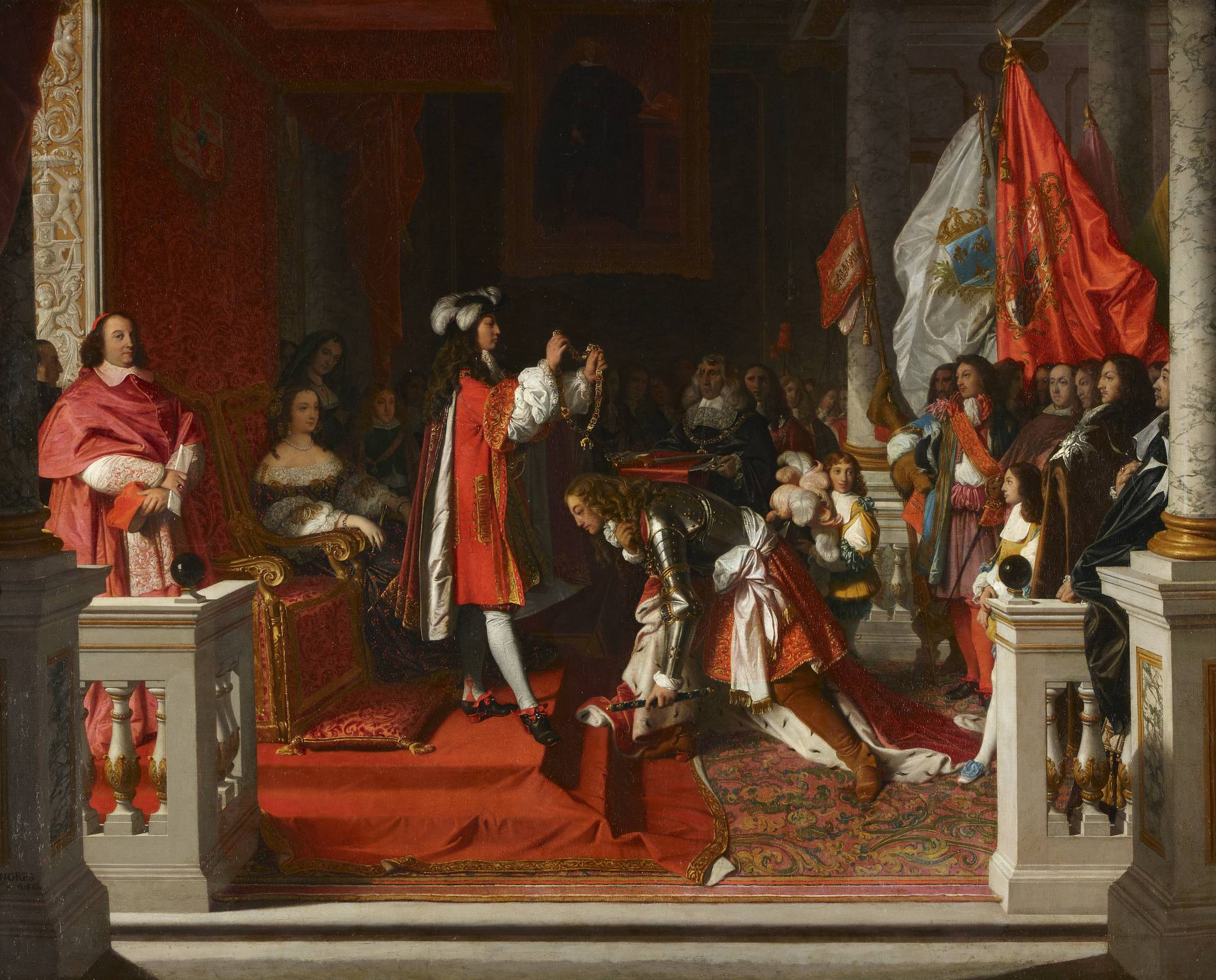
Philip V of Spain Investing Marshal Berwick with the Golden Fleece by Jean-Auguste-Dominique Ingres, 1818.

Louis XIV was in the habit of sending his marshals lengthy orders. In 1707 he wrote to Louis Joseph, Duke of Vendôme: "...it will be absolutely necessary for the Duke of Berwick to detach a similar proportion and to send a sufficient number of troops to the Elector of Bavaria..." The French allocated 75 battalions and 140 squadrons to the Rhine front, giving Berwick a comfortable numerical superiority. On 25 April 1707, Berwick won a great and decisive victory at the Battle of Almanza, where an Englishman at the head of a Franco-Spanish army defeated Ruvigny, a Frenchman at the head of an Anglo-Portuguese-Dutch army. Five English, six Dutch, and three Portuguese regiments were captured with all the cannon and regimental colours. The defeat ended Allied hopes of putting the Habsburg candidate on the Spanish throne. Berwick was "the brave English general who had defeated the French" to confused Tories. After Almanza, Berwick was created Duque de Liria y Xérica (English: Duke of Liria and Jérica) and Lieutenant of Aragon by Philip V of Spain in 1707, and Duc de Fitz-James (English: Duke of Fitz-James) in the Peerage of France by Louis XIV in 1710. But in the meantime in July 1707, Berwick heard the Allies had left Maastricht and sent 34 battalions and 75 squadrons north to meet Prince Eugene's army. In the spring of 1708, a Dutch force raided Berwick's camp at Cenco, killing all the men in their tents, with Berwick expressing shock at the "barbarous" action. By July Berwick had caught up with Vendôme's army at Oudenarde, but was yet to arrive, anticipating Vendôme would retreat to join up his force at Gavre six miles away. But Berwick was at Givet on River Meuse when he heard of Vendôme's heavy defeat. Berwick rescued 9,000 stragglers, using them to garrison Douai, and then moved toward Lille, where he prepared to be besieged. However, the English arrived there first and managed to dismantle the defensive ramparts before he could reach them. Nonetheless, on 3 August, Berwick reckoned a siege was afoot, reinforcing the garrison with 20 battalions and 7 squadrons of dragoons with horses. Lille was a heavily defended and fortified town, important to King Louis. Astutely, Berwick realized Marlborough was trying to bring his battered army to battle, despite constant missives from Versailles ordering an immediate attack. On 22 October Marshal Boufflers finally gave up and marched out to Douai. But crucially, Berwick's army remained intact.

Berwick was Marlborough's nephew. Long before he had become a Marshal of France, he had remained in contact with his uncle's family when they were in exile, when the siege at Lille began. Berwick sent an equerry to purchase some horses from the Allies. Furthermore, his widowed mother married Colonel Godfrey of the English army. In 1710, the Tories won the election, sweeping away Protestant opposition to a peace with France. Berwick, encouraged by Louis XIV, planned an army to invade England. With Marlborough out of favour, France was saved the indignity of defeat.

== Later life ==
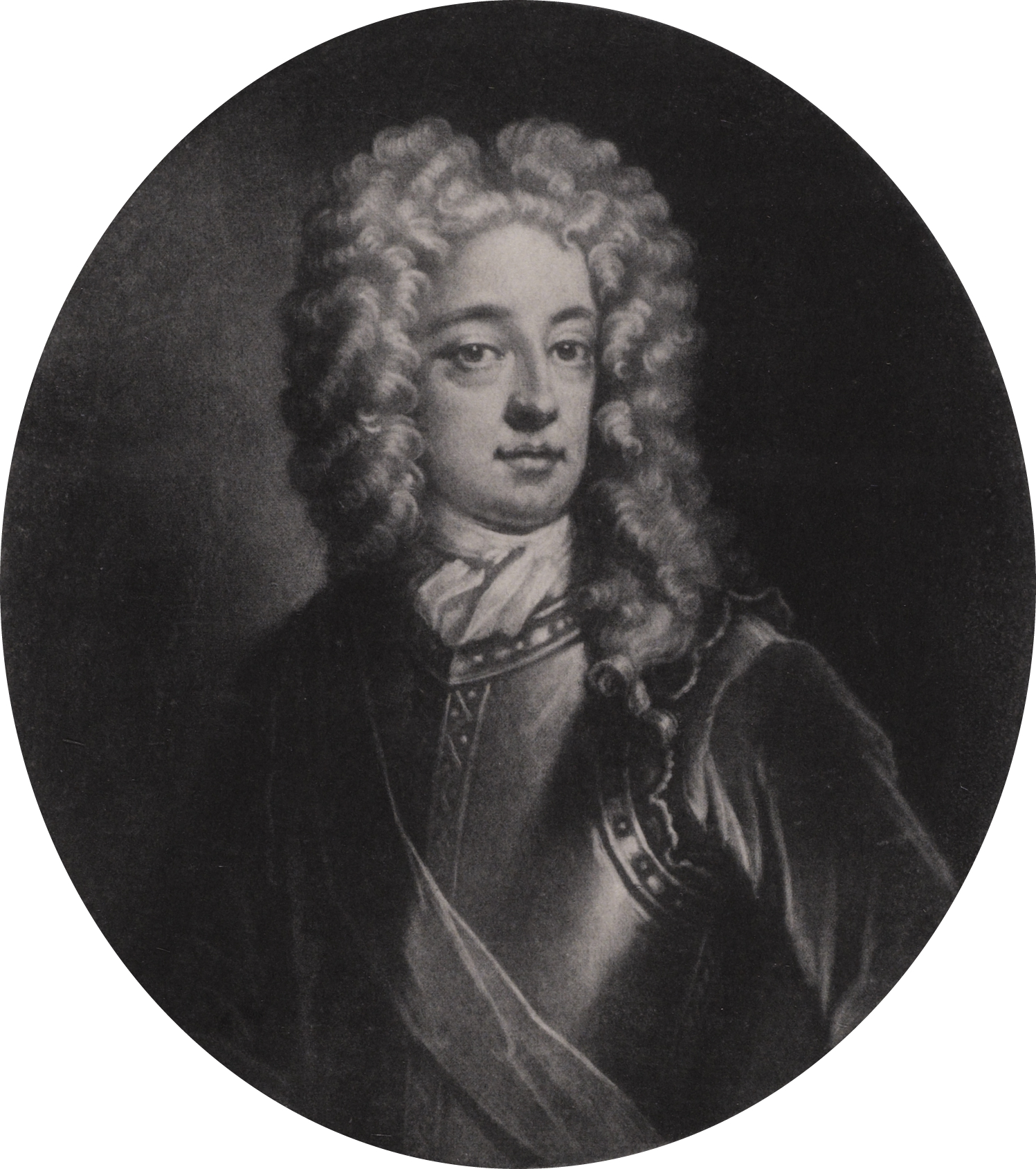
The Duke of Berwick depicted in 1715

The last great event of the War of the Spanish Succession was the Duke of Berwick's storming of Barcelona, after a long siege, on 11 September 1714. In that year, he was appointed a Knight of the Golden Fleece. Trying to explain the failure of the Jacobite Risings, the Old Pretender "never forgave his half-brother, The Blues ex-colonel, Berwick, now an experienced and competent commander, for declining to lead his forces". Soon afterwards, Berwick was appointed military governor of the province of Guienne, where he became friendly with Montesquieu. In December 1718 he led an army to Spain, against Philip V, in the War of the Quadruple Alliance, bombarding San Sebastián and occupying the districts of Gipuzkoa and Biscay. Many years of peace followed this campaign that ended the following March. The King of Spain sued for peace in January 1720 and Berwick was not called to serve again in the field until 1733. In that year he was chosen to lead the Army of the Rhine in the War of the Polish Succession, successfully besieging Kehl in 1733. He died a year later when he was decapitated by a cannonball at the Siege of Philippsburg on 12 June 1734.

== Marriages and children ==
Berwick had children by both his marriages. His descendants were the French Ducs de Fitz-James and the Spanish Duques de Liria and later the Dukes of Alba.

Berwick fell in love with General Patrick Sarsfield's 19-year-old pregnant widow. They married in Saint-Germain-en-Laye (Yvelines) on 26 March 1695, two years after Sarsfield's death in the Battle of Landen on 29 July 1693. This was Honora, Countess of Lucan (formerly known as Lady Honora Burke or Lady Honora de Burgh; b. Portumna Castle, Co. Galway, c. 1675 – d. Pézenas, 16 January 1698), the daughter of William Burke, 7th Earl of Clanricarde, an Anglo-Irish peer. Berwick raised Sarsfield's son, James Sarsfield, 2nd Earl of Lucan, who died childless in 1718, as his own. Berwick and the Countess had a son:

1. James Francis Fitz-James Stuart, who inherited the title Duke of Berwick on his father's death, (Note: "known as earl of Tinmouth until he became duke of Liria in 1716. Volume two of the Complete Peerage (1912), following earlier authorities, thought that he was attainted in England about this time, but an appendix in volume twelve, part two, showed that no act of attainder was brought against Berwick in parliament and that there is no evidence that Berwick was outlawed, which would also have resulted in attainder. Berwick thus probably retained his English peerage until his death" (Handley 2011).) or Jacobo Francisco Fitz-James Stuart, 2nd Duke of Berwick, 2nd Duke of Liria and Xerica (Saint-Germain-en-Laye, Yvelines, 21 October 1696 – Naples, Italy, 2 June 1738). He married Catalina Ventura Colón de Portugal, Duchess of Veragua and Duchess of La Vega, a descendant of Christopher Columbus.

After Honora Burke's death just three years later in 1698, Berwick married Anne Bulkeley (d. 12 June 1751), daughter of Henry Bulkeley (Master of the Household to James II), in Paris on 18 April 1700. They had eight sons and five daughters: These included Charles de Fitz-James, the 4th Duke of Fitz-James.

1. Henry James FitzJames (15 November 1702 – 13 October 1721), 2d Duke of FitzJames, who married Victoire Félicité de Durfort.
2. Henriette Anne FitzJames (16 September 1705 – 3 July 1759), who married the Marquis de Reynel, and had four children.
3. François FitzJames (9 June 1709 – 19 July 1754), 3d Duke of FitzJames. He took Holy Orders.
4. Henri FitzJames (8 September 1711 – 4 November 1712), who died young.
5. Charles FitzJames (4 November 1712 – 22 March 1787), 4th Duke of FitzJames, who married Victoire Goyon de Matignon, and had six children.
6. Laure Anne FitzJames (1713 – 6 December 1766), who married Timoléon de Montagu, Marquis de Bouzols.
7. Marie Émilie FitzJames (9 October 1715 – 3 January 1770), who married François de Perusse, Comte des Cars, and had four children.
8. Édouard FitzJames (17 October 1716 – 5 May 1758)
9. Anne Sophia FitzJames (1717 – 25 April 1763), who married

== Notes ==
Military offices
Preceded by The Lord Ferrers	Colonel of The Princess Anne of Denmark's; Regiment of Foot; 1686–1688	Succeeded by John Beaumont
Preceded by The Earl of Gainsborough	Governor of Portsmouth; 1687–1689	Succeeded by Thomas Tollemache
Preceded by The Earl of Oxford	Colonel of The Royal Regiment of Horse; 1688	Succeeded by Earl of Arran
Preceded by The Lord Churchill	Captain and Colonel of the 3rd Troop of Horse Guards; 1688–1689	Succeeded by The Lord Churchill
Honorary titles
Preceded by The Earl of Gainsborough; Viscount Campden	Lord Lieutenant of Hampshire; 1687–1688	Succeeded by The Marquess of Winchester
Preceded by The Earl of Gainsborough	Custos Rotulorum of Hampshire; 1688	Succeeded by The Marquess of Winchester
Peerage of England
New title	Duke of Berwick; 1687–1734	Next: James Fitz-James Stuart
New title	Earl of Tinmouth; 1687–1734	Next: James Fitz-James Stuart
New title	Baron Bosworth; 1687–1734	Next: James Fitz-James Stuart
Spanish nobility
New title	Duke of Berwick; 1707–1734	Next: James Fitz-James Stuart
New title	Duke of Liria and Jérica; 1707–1734	Next: James Fitz-James Stuart
French nobility
New title	Duke of Fitz-James; 1710–1734	Next: Henry James Fitz-James
