= Charles Auguste de Goyon, Count of Gacé =

French diplomat (1647–1729)

Charles Auguste de Goyon
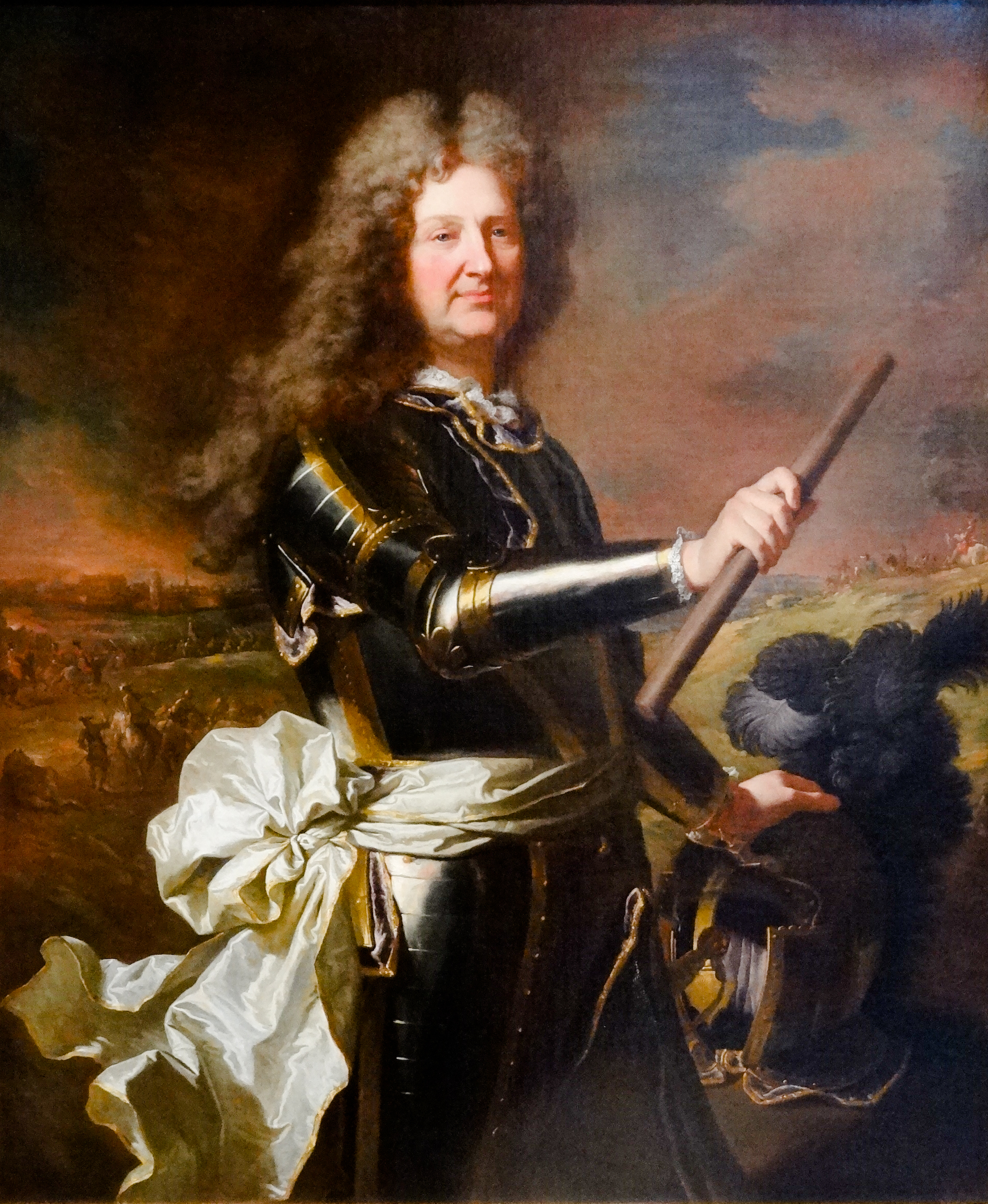
- The Maréchal de Matignon.
- Born: Charles Auguste de Goyon; May 28, 1647; Torigni-sur-Vire
- Died: December 6, 1729 (aged 82); Paris
- Other name: Maréchal de Matignon
- Occupations: Soldier and Diplomat
- Parents: François de Goyon, sieur of Matignon (father); Anne de Malon (mother)

Coat of arms of the Maréchal de Matignon.

Charles Auguste de Goyon, Count of Gacé (1647–1729), was the French soldier, diplomat and Marshal of France from 1693 after which he was known as the Maréchal de Matignon.

== Biography ==
The youngest son of François de Goyon, sieur of Matignon (died 1675) by his wife Anne de Malon,he descended from the ancient noble Norman Bricquebec family.

He fought in the Siege of Candia (1669) and the Franco-Dutch War (1672-1678). In 1689, he was sent to Ireland to support King James II of England in the Williamite War in Ireland.

A career soldier, Goÿon rose to become Governor of Aunis (1688), maréchal de camp (1691), before being appointed Field Marshal (1708). In that year, he was sent as Ambassador to Great Britain, but returned after the aborted French invasion of Britain (1708) to participate in the Battle of Oudenarde.
He received the Order of the Holy Spirit in 1724 and died in 1729.

A presumed portrait of him by Hyacinthe Rigaud hangs in the Musée des Beaux-Arts de Caen. It could also be the portrait of Robert Jean Antoine de Franquetot de Coigny (1652–1704).

== See also ==
- Gacé
- Jacques I, Prince of Monaco, his nephew.
