= Helen Burke, Countess Clanricarde =

Irish countess (died 1722)

Helen Burke
- Countess of Clanricarde
- Born: Helen MacCarty
- Died: 1722
- Family: MacCarthy of Muskerry
- Spouses: John FitzGerald of Dromana; William Burke, 7th Earl of Clanricarde
- Issue Detail: Ulick; Margaret; William; Honora
- Father: Donough MacCarty, 1st Earl of Clancarty
- Mother: Eleanor Butler

Helen Burke, Countess Clanricarde (née MacCarty; c. 1641 – 1722), also styled Helen FitzGerald, was brought to France by her mother fleeing the Cromwellian conquest of Ireland, against which her father, the 2nd Earl Muskerry, resisted to the bitter end. In France, she was educated at the abbey of Port-Royal-des-Champs together with her cousin Elizabeth Hamilton. She married three times. All her children were by her second husband, William Burke, 7th Earl of Clanricarde. She was the mother of Ulick Burke, 1st Viscount Galway, Margaret, Viscountess Iveagh, and Honora Sarsfield.

== Birth and origins ==
Helen was probably born in the early 1640s, (Note: For the needs of the timeline, her birth year might be estimated to be 1641, assuming that she was 19 when she married and that this marriage was in 1660, as well as knowing that her 1st husband died in 1662.) probably at Macroom Castle, County Cork, Ireland, her parents' habitual residence. She was the eldest daughter of Donough MacCarty and his wife Eleanor Butler. At the time of Helen's birth, her father was the 2nd Viscount Muskerry, but he would be advanced to Earl of Clancarty in 1658. Her father's family were the MacCartys of Muskerry, a Gaelic Irish dynasty that branched from the MacCarthy-Mor line with Dermot MacCarthy, second son of Cormac MacCarthy-Mor, a medieval Prince of Desmond. This second son had been granted the Muskerry area as appanage.

Helen's mother was the eldest sister of James Butler, 1st Duke of Ormond. Her mother's family, the Butler dynasty, was Old English and descended from Theobald Walter, who had been appointed Chief Butler of Ireland by King Henry II in 1177. Helen's parents were both Catholic. They had married before 1641.

Family tree

Helen MacCarty with her three husbands, her parents, and selected relatives. (Note: Helen's three husbands: 1st left, 2nd right and 3rd below. Also see the lists of siblings and children in the text.)

Charles; 1st Viscount; Muskerry; 1564–1641 | Thomas; Viscount; Thurles d. 1619 d.v.p.*
Donough; 1st Earl; Clancarty; 1594–1665 | Eleanor; Butler; 1612–1682 | James; Butler; 1st Duke; Ormond; 1610–1688
Sir John; FitzGerald of the Decies d. 1662 | Helen d. 1722 | William; Burke; 7th Earl; Clanricarde d. 1687 | Callaghan; 3rd Earl; Clancarty c. 1633 – 1665 | Justin; Viscount; Mount- cashel c. 1643 – 1694
Thomas; Burke d. c. 1719
Ulick; 1st Viscount; Galway; 1670–1691 | Margaret; Magennis; 1673–1744 | Patrick; Sarsfield; 1st Earl; Lucan; 1655–1693 | Honora; Burke; 1674–1698 | James; FitzJames; 1st Duke; Berwick; 1670–1734
James; 2nd Earl; Lucan; 1693–1719 | James; 2nd Duke; Berwick; 1696–1738

Legend

| XXX | Subject of the article | XXX | Dukes of Berwick | XXX | Viscounts Muskerry & Earls of Clancarty |

*d.v.p. = predeceased his father (decessit vita patris).
**courtesy title

Helen had three brothers and one sister, which are listed in his father's article.

== Irish wars ==
She was a child while her father, Lord Muskerry, commanded the Confederates' Munster army and fought the Parliamentarians in the Cromwellian Conquest of Ireland. He fought to the bitter end, surrendering Ross Castle near Killarney to Edmund Ludlow on 27 June 1652 and disbanding his 5000-strong army. He was allowed to embark to Spain. He lost his estates in 1652 with the Cromwellian Act of Settlement. Arriving in Spain he found that he was not welcome and returned to Ireland in 1653, where he was put on trial for the murder of English settlers in 1642. He was, however, acquitted.

== Exile ==
Helen, aged about ten, her mother, her sister Margaret, and her brother Justin had fled to France already sometime before the fall of Ross Castle. Her mother lived with her sister Mary, Lady Hamilton, in the convent of the Feuillantines in Paris, and Helen was sent to boarding school at the abbey of Cistercian nuns of Port-Royal-des-Champs, near Versailles, together with her cousin Elizabeth Hamilton. This school had an excellent reputation and was ahead of its time by teaching in French rather than in Latin. She attended this school for seven or eight years. The abbey also was a stronghold of Jansenism, a Catholic religious movement that insisted on earnestness and asceticism. In 1658 her father was created Earl of Clancarty by Charles II in Brussels, where he was then in exile.

== Restoration and first marriage ==
At the Restoration her father returned to Ireland and recovered his estates in 1660 and was confirmed in their possession in the Act of Settlement 1662.

Helen stayed behind in France at her convent. However, Jansenism was declared heretic for its stance on grace and original sin. Helen was forcibly removed from the abbey in 1661 and was accommodated by Louis Charles d'Albert de Luynes.

Her brother Charles, Viscount Muskerry, as he was now, attended the court in Whitehall together with his wife, who was ridiculed by Elizabeth Hamilton who had been together with her at school.

Helen MacCarty soon married Sir John FitzGerald, Lord of the Decies, seated at Dromana House near Villierstown, County Waterford, as his second wife. His first wife had been Katherine Power, second daughter of John Power, 5th Baron Power, of Curraghmore, whom he had married in 1658 and who had died on 22 August 1660. John and Katherine had had an only child, Katherine FitzGerald, Viscountess Grandison, who would marry Edward FitzGerald-Villiers and become the mother of John Villiers, 1st Earl Grandison. Helen's first marriage was childless and lasted only one or two years as Decies died in 1662.

In 1665 her brother Charles, Lord Muskerry, was killed during the Second Anglo-Dutch War (1665–1667) in the Battle of Lowestoft, a naval engagement with the Dutch.

== Second marriage ==
Her second marriage was to William Burke, 7th Earl of Clanricarde, which brought her the title of Countess of Clanricarde in the Peerage of Ireland. Clanricarde already had sons from a previous marriage, two of whom would succeed him as the 8th and the 9th earls.

William and Helen had four children: (Note: Lodge by error ignores Clanricarde's second marriage to Helen and lists all the children as born by Lettice Shirley, Clanricarde's first wife.)

1. Ulick (1670–1691), created Viscount of Galway and slain at the Battle of Aughrim fighting for the Jacobites
2. Margaret (1673–1744), married first Bryan Magennis, 5th Viscount Iveagh and then Thomas Butler of Garryricken
3. William, died childless
4. Honora (1674–1698), married first Patrick Sarsfield and then the Duke of Berwick

She seems to have lived at Portumna Castle. At least it is known that her daughter Honora was born there.

Her father, Lord Clancarty, died in London on 4 August 1665. Her husband Clanricarde died in 1687 and was succeeded by his son Richard from his first marriage as the 8th Earl of Clanricarde. She was now about 46 years old. In 1689 her brother Justin lost the Battle of Newtownbutler against the Inniskilleners and was taken prisoner. Her son Ulick was killed along with many senior Jacobite officers at the Battle of Aughrim in 1691.

== Third marriage, death, and timeline ==
Helen married again, sometime between 1687 and 1700, to Colonel Thomas Burke. The marriage was childless. Her husband died in about 1719 and she died on 15 February 1721 at Kilcash Castle, the house of her daughter, Margaret. Her substantial fortune was the subject of much legal dispute in succeeding generations.

Timeline
As her birth date is uncertain, so are all her ages.
| Age | Date | Event |
| 0 | 1641, estimate | Born in Ireland, probably at Macroom Castle, County Cork |
| 7–8 | 1649, 30 Jan | King Charles I beheaded. |
| 9–10 | 1651, early | Taken to France by her mother |
| 10–11 | 1652, about | Sent to school at Port-Royal-des-Champs |
| 10–11 | 1652, 27 Jun | Father surrendered Ross Castle. |
| 16–17 | 1658, 27 Nov | Father created 1st Earl of Clancarty. |
| 18–19 | 1660, 29 May | Restoration of King Charles II |
| 18–19 | 1660 | Returned to England and Ireland with the Restoration |
| 19–20 | 1661, about | Married 1st John Fitzgerald of Dromana (Note: The date of her 1st marriage is constrained by the Restoration and the death of her 1st husband on 22 August 1662.) |
| 20–21 | 1662 | First husband died. |
| 23–24 | 1665, 3 Jun | Brother Charles killed in the Battle of Lowestoft, a naval engagement with the Dutch. |
| 23–24 | 1665, 4 Aug | Father died in London. |
| 28–29 | 1669, estimate | Married 2ndly William Burke, 7th Earl of Clanricarde as his 2nd wife |
| 28–29 | 1670 | Son Ulick born |
| 31–32 | 1673 | Daughter Margaret born |
| 32–33 | 1674 | Daughter Honora born, her last child |
| 43–44 | 1685, 6 Feb | Accession of King James II, succeeding King Charles II |
| 45–46 | 1687, Oct | Second husband died. |
| 47–48 | 1689, 13 Feb | Accession of William and Mary, succeeding King James II |
| 47–48 | 1689, 31 Jul | Brother Justin lost the Battle of Newtownbutler and was taken prisoner. |
| 56–57 | 1691, 12 Jul | Son Ulick slain at the Battle of Aughrim |
| 56–57 | 1698, estimate | Married 3rdly Colonel Thomas Bourke |
| 60–61 | 1702, 8 Mar | Accession of Queen Anne, succeeding King William III |
| 72–73 | 1714, 1 Aug | Accession of King George I, succeeding Queen Anne |
| 77–78 | 1719, about | Third husband died. |
| 80–81 | 1722 | Died at Kilcash Castle |

== Notes and references ==
=== Sources ===
- Boulger, Demetrius Charles (1911). The Battle of the Boyne. London: Martin Secker. OCLC 1041056932.
- Burke, Jim (2005). A History of De Burgo, De Burgh, De Burca, Burke, Bourke. Ireland: Séamus de Búrka. OCLC 619552006. – Jim Burke!
- Burke, John (1832). A General and Heraldic Dictionary of the Peerage and Baronetage of the British Empire. Vol. I (4th ed.). London: Henry Colburn and Richard Bentley. OCLC 39018719. – Abdy to Hutchinson (for Clanricarde)
- Burke, Bernard (1866). A Genealogical History of the Dormant, Abeyant, Forfeited and Extinct Peerages of the British Empire (New ed.). London: Harrison. OCLC 11501348. (for MacCarty)
- Burke, Bernard; Burke, Ashworth Peter (1909). A Genealogical and Heraldic History of the Peerage and Baronetage, the Privy Council, Knightage and Companionage (71st ed.). London: Harrison. OCLC 28297274.
- Clark, Ruth (1921). Anthony Hamilton: his Life and Works and his Family. London: John Lane. OCLC 459281163.
- Clark, Ruth (1972) [1st pub. 1932]. Strangers and Sojourners at Port Royal. New York: Octagon Books. ISBN 0-374-91664-0.
- Cokayne, George Edward (1913). Gibbs, Vicary (ed.). The complete peerage of England, Scotland, Ireland, Great Britain and the United Kingdom, extant, extinct, or dormant. Vol. III (2nd ed.). London: St Catherine Press. OCLC 228661424. – Canonteign to Cutts (for Clancarty and Clanricarde)
- D'Alton, Rev. Edward Alfred (1910). History of Ireland from the Earliest Times to the Present Day. Vol. Half-volume IV. London: The Gresham Publishing Company. OCLC 749686820. – 1649 to 1782
- Debrett, John (1828). Peerage of the United Kingdom of Great Britain and Ireland. Vol. II (17th ed.). London: F. C. and J. Rivington. OCLC 54499602. – Scotland and Ireland
- Firth, Charles Harding (1894) [1st pub. 1698]. The Memoirs of Edmund Ludlow Lieutenant-General of the Horse in the Army of the Commonwealth of England 1625–1672. Vol. I. Oxford: Clarendon Press. OCLC 1113948779. – 1625 to 1655
- Flood, John (2020). Kilcash and the Butlers of Ormond: Conflict and Kinship from the Middle Ages to the Great Famine. Dublin: Geography Publications. ISBN 978-0-906602-94-2. – Google Books no preview
- Fryde, E. B.; Greenway, D. E.; Porter, S.; Roy, I., eds. (1986). Handbook of British Chronology. Royal Historical Society Guides and Handbooks, No. 2 (3rd ed.). London: Offices of the Royal Historical Society. ISBN 0-86193-106-8. – (for timeline)
- Hamilton, Anthony (1888). Memoirs of Count Grammont. Translated by Walpole, Horace. Philadelphia: Gebbie & Co. OCLC 1048777116.
- Lainé, P. Louis (1836). "Mac-Carthy". Archives généalogiques et historiques de la noblesse de France [Genealogical and Historical Archives of the Nobility of France] (in French). Vol. Tome cinquième. Paris: Imprimerie de Bethune et Plon. pp. 1–102. OCLC 865941166.
- Lodge, John (1789a). Archdall, Mervyn (ed.). The Peerage of Ireland or, A Genealogical History of the Present Nobility of that Kingdom. Vol. I. Dublin: James Moore. OCLC 264906028. – Blood royal, dukes, earls (for Clanricarde)
- Lodge, John (1789b). Archdall, Mervyn (ed.). The Peerage of Ireland or, A Genealogical History of the Present Nobility of that Kingdom. Vol. IV. Dublin: James Moore. OCLC 264906028. – Viscounts (for Thurles)
- O'Hart, John (1892). Irish Pedigrees: Or, the Origin and Stem of the Irish Nation. Vol. I (5th ed.). Dublin: James Duffy & Co. OCLC 7239210. – Irish stem
- Ohlmeyer, Jane H. (2004). "MacCarthy, Donough, first earl of Clancarty (1594–1665)". In Matthew, Colin; Harrison, Brian (eds.). Oxford Dictionary of National Biography. Vol. 35. New York: Oxford University Press. pp. 107–108. ISBN 0-19-861385-7.
- Pope Alexander VII (15 February 1665). Bulle de N. S. P. le Pape Alexandre VII contre les cinq propositions extraites du livre de Jansenius (in French).
- Sainte-Beuve, Charles-Augustin (1878). Port-Royal (in French). Vol. Tome deuxième (4th ed.). Paris: Hachette. OCLC 493070637.
- Seccombe, Thomas (1893). "MacCarthy or MacCarty, Donough, fourth Earl of Clancarty". In Lee, Sidney (ed.). Dictionary of National Biography. Vol. XXXIV. London: Smith, Elder, & Co. pp. 436–438. OCLC 8544105.
- Webb, Alfred (1878). "MacCarty, Donough, Viscount Muskerry, Earl of Clancarty". Compendium of Irish Biography. Dublin: M. H. Gill & Son. p. 303, right column. OCLC 122693688.
