= Ulick Burke, 1st Marquess of Clanricarde =

Irish noble (1604–1657)

General The Marquess of Clanricarde PC (Ire)
- Uilleag de Búrca
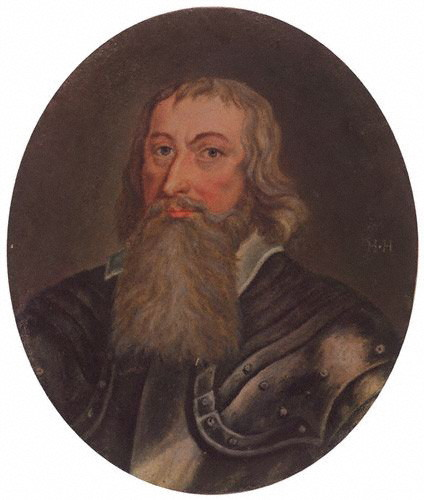
- Painted portrait of the 1st Marquess of Clanricarde

Governor of Galway
- In office 1636–1652
- Succeeded by
Parliamentary Offices
Member of the House of Lords
Lord Temporal
Hereditary Peerage; 12 November 1635 – July 1657
Preceded by	Richard Burke
Succeeded by	Extinct
Member of the Irish House of Lords
Hereditary Peerage; 12 November 1635 – July 1657
Preceded by	Richard Burke
Succeeded by	Richard Burke

Personal details
- Born: Ulick Burke; 1604 London, England
- Died: 1657 Kent, England
- Resting place: Westminster Abbey
- Spouse: Anne Compton
- Children: Margaret Burke
- Parents: Richard, 4th Earl of Clanricarde; Frances Walsingham
- Military career
- Allegiance: English Royalists
- Service years: 1636–1656
- Rank: Lieutenant General; Lord Deputy General
- Commands: Regiment of Foot
- Conflicts: Irish Confederate Wars; Cromwellian Campaign; Battle of Tecroghan; Battle of Meelick Island

Ulick MacRichard Burke, 1st Marquess of Clanricarde, 5th Earl of Clanricarde, 2nd Earl of St Albans PC (Ire) (English: /ˈjuːlɪk ... klænˈrɪkɑːrd/ YOO-lik ... klan-RIK-ard; 1604 – July 1657), styled Lord Dunkellin (/dʌnˈkɛlɪn/ dun-KEL-in) until 1635, was an Irish nobleman who was involved in the Wars of the Three Kingdoms. A Catholic Royalist who had overall command of the Irish forces during the later stages of the Cromwellian conquest of Ireland, he was created Marquess of Clanricarde (1646).

== Birth and origins ==
Family tree

Ulick Burke with wife, parents, and selected relatives (Note: Also see the mention of his daughter in the text.)

Ulick; 3rd Earl d. 1601	Honora; Burke b. c. 1535
Richard; 4th Earl; 1572–1635	Frances; Walsingham; 1567–1633	William; Burke d. 1626	Joan; O'Shaugh- nessy
Ulick; 1st Marquess; 1604–1657	Anne; Compton	Richard; 6th Earl d. 1666	William; 7th Earl d. 1687	Lettice; Shirley c. 1617 – 1655
Richard; 8th Earl d. aft. 1708	John; 9th Earl; 1642–1722	Mary; Talbot d. 1711
Michael; 10th Earl; 1686–1726	Anne; Smith d. 1733

Legend

XXX	Subject of the article	XXX	Earls & Marquesses of Clanricarde	XXX	Earls of Clancarty

Ulick was the son of the 4th Earl of Clanricarde by his wife, Frances Walsingham. Ulick's father was from an Hiberno-Norman family who had been long settled in the west of Ireland. Although during the early sixteenth century the family had rebelled against the Crown on several occasions, Ulick's father had been a strong supporter of Queen Elizabeth I. He fought on the queen's side during Tyrone's Rebellion, notably at the victorious Battle of Kinsale, where he was wounded. After the war, he married the widow of the 2nd Earl of Essex, a recent commander in Ireland, who was the daughter of the English Secretary of State and spymaster Sir Francis Walsingham.

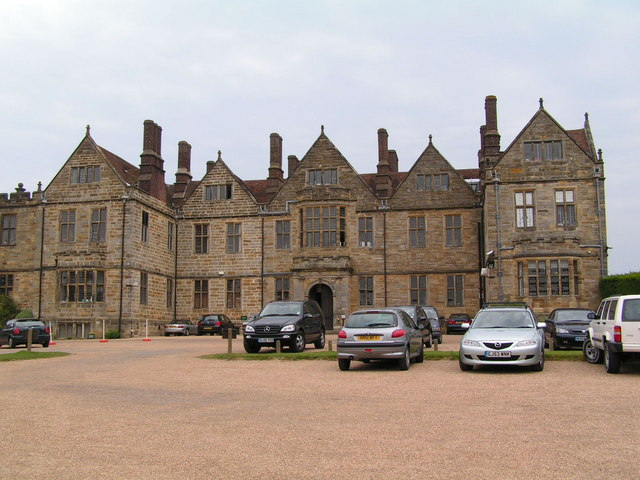
The Marquess's English residence, Somerhill House

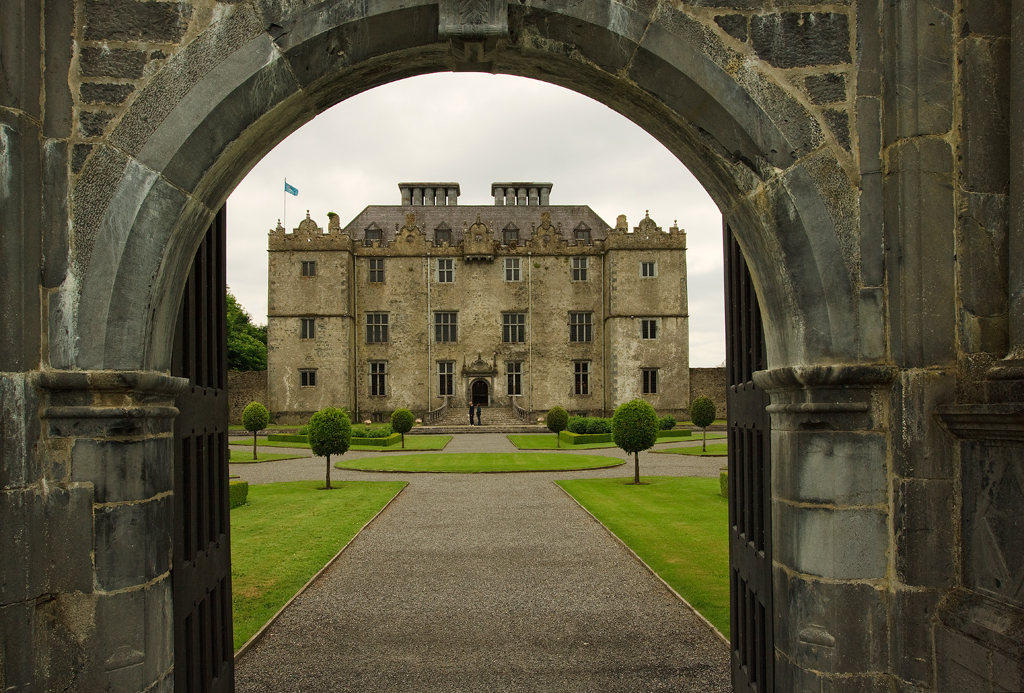
Portumna Castle: The Marquess's Irish residence

== Marriage ==
In 1622, Ulick married Anne Compton (d.1675), daughter of William Compton, 1st Earl of Northampton, and his wife, Elizabeth Spencer.

Ulick and Anne had an only child, Margaret (died 1698), who married:

- 1st Charles MacCarty, Viscount Muskerry, and had a son Charles, 3rd Earl of Clancarty who died young
- 2ndly Robert Villiers, son of Robert Danvers or Villiers, who was himself the suppositious son of John Villiers, 1st Viscount Purbeck
- 3rdly the notorious rake and soldier of fortune Robert Fielding

== Early career ==
Ulick was summoned to the House of Lords as Lord Burgh in 1628, and succeeded his father as 5th Earl of Clanricarde in 1635. In 1636, he inherited Somerhill House on the death of his father. He was a staunch opponent of the policies of the Lord Deputy of Ireland, Thomas Wentworth, 1st Earl of Strafford, who had attempted to seize much of the great Burke inheritance in Connacht for the Crown; there was also personal ill-feeling between the two men since the dispute was thought by many to have hastened the death of Ulick's elderly father. He sat in the Short Parliament of 1640 and attended King Charles I on the Scottish expedition. Charles, unlike Strafford, liked and trusted Lord Clanricarde.

== Wars of the Three Kingdoms ==
Clanricarde was appointed Governor of Galway from 1636, and served as Lieutenant-General and Commander in Connaught from 1644 and was appointed a member of the Privy Council of Ireland (1645). He was Lieutenant-General of the Army from 1646 to 1649 and Lord Deputy General from 1650 to 1652 and left Ireland for England in October 1652.

Somerhill was sequestered by Parliament in 1645, following the Battle of Naseby. During the Irish Confederate Wars, Lord Clanricarde supported the Royalist leader Ormonde in defending Ireland for Charles I against the Parliamentarians by uniting Catholic and Protestant nobles (he being Catholic). He did not join the Catholic Confederate Ireland, but instead helped to broker a military alliance between the Confederates and English Royalists. He commanded the forces of this alliance during the Cromwellian conquest of Ireland, after Lord Ormonde fled the country, and soldiers of his Connaught army helped to win a minor victory at the Battle of Tecroghan. Only a few months later, however, his army was wiped out during the Battle of Meelick Island. Clanricarde was a skilful diplomat but not a great soldier. Like Ormonde, Clanricarde was distrusted by most Catholics in Ireland (he was widely considered to be a friend of the notorious Charles Coote) and thus was thus not capable of halting the Parliamentarian conquest of the country. He was also widely regarded as a man whose actions were governed almost entirely by self-interest.

== Later life ==
In 1652, Lord Clanricarde made peace with the victorious Oliver Cromwell. He lost his lands in the Act of Settlement 1652 but his heirs regained them after the Restoration of Charles II in the Act of Settlement 1662. On his death, the marquessate and the English earldom became extinct; the Irish earldom passed to his cousin Richard.

== Arms ==
Coat of arms of Ulick Burke, 1st Marquess of Clanricarde
Crest A Cat-a-Mountain sejant guardant proper, collared and chained Or. Escutcheon Or, a cross gules in the first quarter a lion rampant sable. Supporters Two Cats-a-Mountain sejant guardant proper, collared and chained Or. Motto UNG ROY, UNG FOY, UNG LOY (One king, one faith, one law)

== Ancestry ==
Ancestors of Ulick Burke, 1st Marquess of Clanricarde

8. Richard Burke, 2nd Earl of Clanricarde
4. Ulick Burke, 3rd Earl of Clanricarde
9. Margaret O'Brien
2. Richard Burke, 4th Earl of Clanricarde
10. John Burke of Clogheroka
5. Honora Burke
11.
1. Ulick Burke, 1st Marquess of Clanricarde
12. William Walsingham
6. Sir Francis Walsingham
13. Joyce Denny
3. Frances Walsingham
14. Henry St Barbe
7. Ursula St Barbe
15. Eleanor Lewknor

== See also ==
- House of Burgh, an Anglo-Norman and Hiberno-Norman dynasty founded in 1193

== Notes and references ==
=== Sources ===
- "Burgh, Ulick de" . Dictionary of National Biography. London: Smith, Elder & Co. 1885–1900.
- Burke, John; Burke, Bernard (1844). Encyclopædia of Heraldry: Or General Armory of England, Scotland, and Ireland, Comprising a Registry of All Armorial Bearings from the Earliest to the Present Time, Including the Late Grants by the College of Arms. H. G. Bohn.
- Burke, Bernard (1884). The General Armory of England, Scotland, Ireland, and Wales; comprising a registry of armorial bearings from the earliest to the present time. University of California Libraries. London: Harrison & Sons.
- Cokayne, G. E. (1889). The Complete Peerage of England, Scotland, Ireland, Great Britain, and the United Kingdom Extant, Extinct, or Dormant (1st ed.). London: George Bell & Sons.

Military offices
Unknown	Governor of Galway; 1636–1652	Unknown
Peerage of Ireland
New creation	Marquess of Clanricarde; 1646–1657	Extinct
Preceded by Richard Burke	Earl of Clanricarde; 1635–1657	Succeeded by Richard Burke
Preceded by Thomas Bourke	Viscount Bourke of Clanmories; 1650–1657	Extinct
Peerage of England
Preceded by Richard Burke	Earl of St Albans; 1635–1657	Extinct
