= Honora Burke =

Irish aristocrat (c. 1675 – 1698)

- Duchess of Berwick
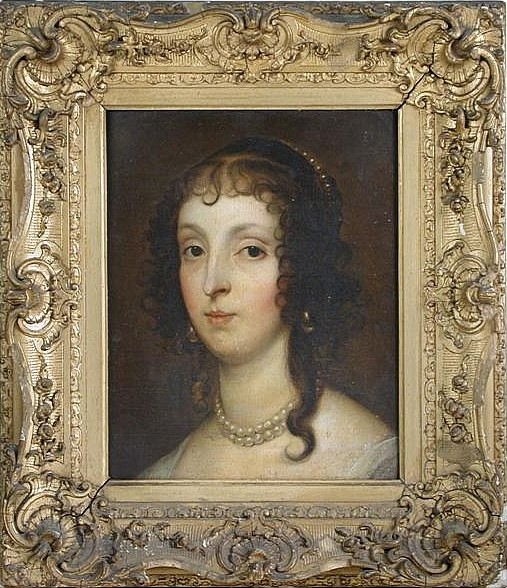
- Born: c. 1675; Portumna Castle
- Died: 16 January 1698 (aged c. 23); Pézenas, Languedoc, France
- Noble family: Burke
- Spouses: Patrick Sarsfield, 1st Earl of Lucan; James, 1st Duke of Berwick
- Issue Detail: James Sarsfield; James, 2nd Duke of Berwick
- Father: William, 7th Earl of Clanricarde
- Mother: Helen MacCarty

Honora Burke (later Honora FitzJames, Duchess of Berwick on Tweed; c. 1675 – 1698) was an Irish noblewoman. Honora married Patrick Sarsfield and went into French exile where he followed her soon afterwards. After his death at the Battle of Landen, she married James FitzJames, 1st Duke of Berwick, an illegitimate son of James II. Honora may have introduced the country dance (contredanse anglaise) to the French court.

== Birth and origins ==
Honora was born about 1675 at Portumna Castle, County Galway. She was the youngest child of William Burke and his second wife, Helen MacCarty. Her father was William Burke, 7th Earl of Clanricarde. The Burkes (originally De Burgh) were an Old English family long-established in Connacht. Her mother was a daughter of Donough MacCarty, 1st Earl of Clancarty and thus belonged to the MacCarthy of Muskerry dynasty, a Gaelic Irish family that descended from the kings of Desmond. She had previously been married to Sir John Fitzgerald of Dromana. Honora was raised as a Roman Catholic. She was often called Honora de Burgh during this period.

Family tree

Honora Burke with her two husbands, her parents, and other selected relatives. (Note: Also see the lists of siblings and children in the text.)

William; Burke d. 1626	Donough; 1st Earl; Clancarty; 1594–1665	Eleanor; Butler; 1612–1682
William; Burke; 7th Earl; Clanricarde d. 1687	Helen; MacCarty d. 1722	Justin; MacCarthy; Viscount; Mount- cashel d. 1694
Ulick d. 1691	Margaret d. 1744
Patrick; Sarsfield; 1st Earl; Lucan; 1655–1693	Honora; Burke c. 1675 – 1698	James; FitzJames; 1st Duke; Berwick; 1670–1734
James; Sarsfield; 2nd Earl; Lucan; 1693–1719	James; Fitz-James; Stuart; 2nd Duke; Berwick; 1696–1738

Legend

XXX	Subject of the article	XXX	Dukes of Berwick	XXX	Earls of Lucan
XXX	Earls of Clanricarde	XXX	Earls of Clancarty

Honora listed among her siblings
She appears below at the bottom of the list of siblings as the youngest:
1. Ulick (1670–1691), created Viscount of Galway and slain at the Battle of Aughrim fighting for the Jacobites (Note: Lodge by error ignores Clanricarde's second marriage to Helen and lists all the children as born by Lettice Shirley, his first wife.)
2. Margaret (1673–1744), first married Bryan Magennis, 5th Viscount of Iveagh and then Thomas Butler of Garryricken
3. William, died childless in France
4. Honora (c. 1675 – 1698)

Honora's half-siblings
Half-siblings from her father's first marriage were:
1. Richard (died after 1708), became the 8th Earl of Clanricarde
2. John (1642–1722), became the 9th Earl of Clanricarde and
3. Thomas (died 1688), killed at the Siege of Buda, Hungary (Note: There probably is some error here as the siege of Buda was in 1686.)

== Early life ==
Her father died in 1687 and was succeeded by her half-brother Richard as the 8th Earl of Clanricarde. Honora inherited a fortune of £3,500 from her father. Her mother married thirdly, sometime between 1687 and 1700, to Colonel Thomas Burke.

== First marriage ==
In the winter of 1689/90 Honora, aged 15, married Patrick Sarsfield, aged about 35, at Portumna Abbey. The couple went to live in Sarsfield's house at Lucan near Dublin. Sarsfield was at that time the eldest living son of a landowner from County Kildare and an experienced soldier, serving in the Irish Army of James II during the Williamite War in Ireland.

Sarsfield rose rapidly to become one of the leaders of the Jacobite movement in Ireland, noted in particular for the Ballyneety Raid on King William's artillery train shortly before the Siege of Limerick (1690). In January 1691 James II ennobled him for this achievement making him the 1st Earl of Lucan. She therefore became Countess of Lucan. After the surrender of Limerick following a second siege in 1691, Lucan led the defeated Irish Army to France to continue serving the exiled James II, an event known as the Flight of the Wild Geese.

Honora had probably left for France a year earlier with other Jacobite ladies. In France she was admired for her beauty and is said to have introduced "les contredanses anglaises" (English country dance) to the French Court. In 1692 her husband participated in a failed plan to invade England.

In April 1693 Honora and Patrick had one son:

1. James Francis Edward (1693–1719), became the 2nd Earl of Lucan and took part in the planned 1719 Jacobite Rising in Ireland, but died of natural causes shortly afterwards.

He was named after James Francis Edward Stuart, the Jacobite Prince of Wales, later known as the Old Pretender.

On 29 July 1693 Lucan was mortally wounded at the Battle of Landen and died shortly afterwards at Huy.

It has been said that Catalina Sarsfield, who married a German adventurer, known for having briefly established himself as King Theodore of Corsica, was a daughter of Honora and her first husband. In fact Catalina (the Spanish form of Catherine) came from the Limerick branch of the Sarsfield family and was born in Nantes to David Sarsfield, a distant cousin of Lucan.

After Lucan's death the dowager countess joined the Jacobite court-in-exile at Saint-Germain-en-Laye near Paris. She tried to help the Irish community there, part of which lived in great poverty but lacked herself the means.

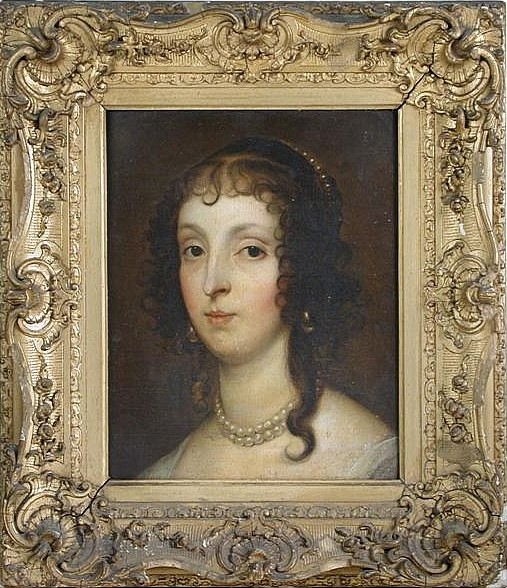
English portrait of Honora de Burke

== Second marriage ==
At Saint-Germain-en-Laye the dowager Countess Lucan met James FitzJames, 1st Duke of Berwick and fell in love with him. Berwick was an illegitimate son of James II and Arabella Churchill, and pursued a brilliant military career since an early age. He had served alongside Lucan in Ireland. Honora married James on 26 March 1695 in the chapel of the Château de Saint-Germain-en-Laye. making her the Duchess of Berwick. The King was not overjoyed at the marriage, as he had wanted his son to make a grander match that might have helped the Jacobite cause. In that same year her husband was attainted in England and therefore lost, at least officially, his title. However, she and her husband continued to use it and were generally known as the Duke and Duchess of Berwick. Saint-Simon, for example calls him so in 1698.

Honora and James had a son:

- James (1696–1738), who served in the Spanish Army and founded a dynasty in that country.

== Death and timeline ==
She died on 16 January 1698 of consumption, leaving her husband in "great grief". She was buried in the Convent of English Benedictines in Pontoise. Her burial was attended many prominent Jacobites: Henry FitzJames (Berwicks's brother), Lord Perth, Melfort, Richard Hamilton, James Porter, Lord Waldegrave, and Dominic Maguire (the Primate of all Ireland).

Her husband married Anne Bulkeley, daughter of Henry Bulkeley (Master of the Household to James II) three years later on 18 April 1700.

Timeline
As her birth date is uncertain, so are all her ages.
Age	Date	Event
0	1675, about	Born at Portumna Castle.
10	1685, 6 Feb	Accession of King James II, succeeding King Charles II
12	1687, Oct	Father died.
13	1689, 9 Jan	Married Sarsfield at Portumna Abbey.
14	1689, 13 Feb	Accession of William and Mary, succeeding King James II
14	1689, 12 Mar	King James II landed at Kinsale.
15–16	1691, Jan	Became Countess of Lucan as Sarsfield is created Earl of Lucan by James II.
16	1691, 12 Jul	Brother Ulick slain at the Battle of Aughrim.
18	1693, Apr	Son James Francis Edward born.
18	1693, 29 Jul	1st husband mortally wounded at the Battle of Landen.
19	1695, 9 Jan	Married 2ndly Berwick at Saint-Germain-en-Laye and became Duchess of Berwick.
19–20	1695	2nd husband attainted in England.
21	1696, 21 Oct	Son James born.
22	1698, 16 Jan	Died at Pézenas, Languedoc, France.

== Notes and references ==
=== Sources ===
- Burke, Bernard (1866). A Genealogical History of the Dormant, Abeyant, Forfeited and Extinct Peerages of the British Empire (New ed.). London: Harrison. OCLC 11501348.
- Burke, Bernard (1869). A Genealogical and Heraldic Dictionary of the Peerage and Baronetage of the British Empire (31st ed.). London: Harrison. OCLC 1045624502. (for Clanricarde)
- Burke, Jim (2005). A History of De Burgo, De Burgh, De Burca, Burke, Bourke. Ireland: Séamus de Búrka. OCLC 619552006. – Jim Burke!
- Cokayne, George Edward (1913). Gibbs, Vicary (ed.). The complete peerage of England, Scotland, Ireland, Great Britain and the United Kingdom, extant, extinct, or dormant. Vol. III (2nd ed.). London: St Catherine Press. OCLC 228661424. – Canonteign to Cutts (for Clancarty and Clanricarde)
- Debrett, John (1828). Peerage of the United Kingdom of Great Britain and Ireland. Vol. II (17th ed.). London: F. C. and J. Rivington. OCLC 54499602. – Scotland and Ireland
- FitzJames, James FitzJames, the Duke of Berwick (1778). Mémoires du Maréchal de Berwick (in French). Vol. Tome premier. Paris: Moutard. OCLC 1049657563.
- Fryde, E. B.; Greenway, D. E.; Porter, S.; Roy, I., eds. (1986). Handbook of British Chronology. Royal Historical Society Guides and Handbooks, No. 2 (3rd ed.). London: Offices of the Royal Historical Society. ISBN 0-86193-106-8. – (for timeline)
- Gasper, Julia (2013). Theodore Von Neuhoff, King of Corsica: The Man Behind the Legend. Newark, Delaware: University of Delaware Press. ISBN 978-1-61149-440-2.
- Handley, Stuart (2004). "FitzJames, James (1650/51–1712)". In Matthew, Colin; Harrison, Brian (eds.). Oxford Dictionary of National Biography. Vol. 19. New York: Oxford University Press. pp. 881–884. ISBN 0-19-861369-5.
- Hardy, William John (1913). Calendar of the State Papers, Domestic Series, of the Reign of William III. 1 January—31 December, 1696. London: His/Her Majesty's Stationery Office. pp. 6 v. OCLC 878147296.
- Lodge, John (1789). Archdall, Mervyn (ed.). The Peerage of Ireland or, A Genealogical History of the Present Nobility of that Kingdom. Vol. I. Dublin: James Moore. OCLC 264906028. – Blood royal, dukes, earls (for Clanricarde)
- Lyons, Mary Ann (2008). "Digne de compassion: female dependants of Irish Jacobite soldiers in France, c.1692-c.1730". Eighteenth-Century Ireland. 23: 55–75. doi:10.3828/eci.2008.6. JSTOR 27806924.
- Mulcahy, John (2003). "Honora Burke, the Flower of Portumna". Irish Arts Review. 20 (3): 118–119. JSTOR 25502985.
- O'Callaghan, John Cornelius (1854). History of the Irish Brigades in the Service of France. New York: P. O'Shea Publisher. OCLC 1046538374.
- O'Hart, John (1892). Irish Pedigrees: Or, the Origin and Stem of the Irish Nation. Vol. I (5th ed.). Dublin: James Duffy & Co. OCLC 7239210. – Irish stem
- Petrie, Charles (1953). The Marshal Duke of Berwick: The Picture of an Age. London: Eyre and Spottiswoode. OCLC 1049657563.
- Ruvigny, Melville Henry, Marquis de (1904). Jacobite Peerage Baronetage Knightage and Grants of Honour. Edinburgh: T C & E C Jack. OCLC 655825906.
- Saint-Simon, Louis de Rouvroy, duc de (1879). Boislisle, Arthur de (ed.). Mémoires du duc de Saint-Simon (in French). Vol. Tome cinquième (2nd ed.). Paris: Hachette. OCLC 1068033585. – 1698
- Todhunter, John (1895). Life of Patrick Sarsfield, Earl of Lucan. London: T. Fisher Unwin. OCLC 6152671.
- Trou, M. l'abbé (1841). Recherches historiques, archéologiques et biographiques sur la ville de Pontoise (in French). Pontoise: Dufey. OCLC 162335368.
- Wauchope, Piers (2004). "Sarsfield, Patrick, Jacobite first earl of Lucan (d. 1693)". In Matthew, Colin; Harrison, Brian (eds.). Oxford Dictionary of National Biography. Vol. 48. New York: Oxford University Press. pp. 993–996. ISBN 0-19-861398-9.
- Witherow, Thomas (1879). Derry and Enniskillen in the Year 1689. London & Belfast: William Mallan & Son. OCLC 82779901. (for timeline)
