= Ulick Burke, 1st Viscount Galway =

Irish Jacobite and noble (died 1691)

Ulick Burke
- Viscount Galway
- Tenure: 1687–1691
- Born: c. 1670
- Died: 12 July 1691
- Spouse: Frances Lane
- Issue Detail: A daughter probably called Elizabeth
- Father: William Burke, 7th Earl of Clanricarde
- Mother: Helen MacCarty

Ulick Burke, 1st Viscount Galway (English: /ˈjuːlɪk/ YOO-lik; c. 1670 – 1691) was an Irish army officer slain at the Battle of Aughrim while fighting for the Jacobites during the Williamite War in Ireland.

== Birth and origins ==
Family tree

Ulick Burke with wife, parents, and selected relatives. (Note: Also see the lists of siblings and children in the text.)

William; Burke d. 1626	Joan; O'Shaugh- nessy
Richard; 6th Earl d. 1666	Lettice; Shirley c. 1617 – 1655	William; 7th Earl d. 1687	Helen; MacCarty d. 1722
Richard; 8th Earl d. aft. 1708	John; 9th Earl; 1642–1722	Ulick; 1st Viscount; Galway; 1670–1691	Elizabeth; Lane d. 1713
Michael; 10th Earl; 1686–1726	Anne; Smith d. 1733

Legend

XXX	Ulick; Burke	XXX	Earls of Clanricarde

Ulick was born about 1670 a younger son of William Burke and his second wife, Helen MacCarty. His father was the 7th Earl of Clanricarde.

Ulick's mother was his father's second wife. She was a daughter of Donough MacCarty, 1st Earl of Clancarty, and therefore belonged to the MacCarthy of Muskerry dynasty, a Gaelic Irish family that descended from the kings of Desmond.

Ulick was one of four siblings, who are listed in his father's article. He also had half-siblings from his father's first marriage, who are also listed in his father's article.

His father was succeeded by his half-brothers Richard and John as the 8th and the 9th Earl.

Ulick was the brother-in-law of Jacobite leader Patrick Sarsfield, who married Ulick's sister, Honora Burke.

== Viscount Galway ==
He was created by letters patent dated 2 June 1687 Baron of Tyaquin and Viscount Galway. The baronial title derived from the barony of Tiaquin which was a major barony in the Burke family estates in County Galway. This was the second creation of the latter title.

== Marriage and child ==
In 1688 Galway, as he was now, married a daughter of George Lane, 1st Viscount Lanesborough, by his second wife Frances, daughter of Richard Sackville, 5th Earl of Dorset. His wife's name is given either as Elizabeth or as Frances. Ulick's wife remarried to Henry Fox after his death and died in 1713.

According to sources, the marriage was either childless, or Ulick and Elizabeth had a daughter who some sources say died in infancy. Others identify her as the Elizabeth Burke, that is described by Turtle Bunbury as a "celebrated poetess", who later married Sir Thomas Blake, 7th Baronet of Menlo, son of Sir Walter Blake, 6th Baronet of Menlo and Anne Kirwan. They had at least a daughter, Anne, and a son, Sir Ulick Blake, 8th Baronet of Menlo.

== James II in Ireland and the Williamite war ==
Galway took his seat at the Lords during the Patriot Parliament in 1689. Following the start of Protestant resistance to the Catholic James II, Galway raised a regiment of foot in Connaught to serve in the Irish Army. Viscount Galway served actively during the war, and was killed along with many senior Jacobite officers at the 1691 Battle of Aughrim.

The Galway title was subsequently made into an earldom and awarded to Henri de Massue, a French Huguenot commander in the Williamite forces.

== Arms ==
Coat of arms of Ulick Burke, 1st Viscount Galway
Crest A Cat-a-Mountain sejant Ermine, charged on the breast with a mullet Sable. Escutcheon Or, a cross Gules in the first quarter a lion rampant Sable a mullet for difference. Supporters Dexter, a Griffin Azure ducally gorged and beaked Or, armed Gules; Sinister, a lion Sable ducally gorged Or, armed Gules. Motto UNG ROY, UNG FOY, UNG LOY (One king, one faith, one law)

== See also ==
- House of Burgh, an Anglo-Norman and Hiberno-Norman dynasty founded in 1193
- Clanricarde

== Notes and references ==
=== Sources ===
- Boulger, Demetrius Charles (1911). The Battle of the Boyne. London: Martin Secker. OCLC 1041056932.
- Burke, Jim (2005). A History of De Burgo, De Burgh, De Burca, Burke, Bourke. Ireland: Séamus de Búrka. OCLC 619552006. – Jim Burke!
- Burke, Bernard (1866). A Genealogical History of the Dormant, Abeyant, Forfeited and Extinct Peerages of the British Empire (New ed.). London: Harrison. OCLC 11501348.
- Burke, Ulick (1757). Smith de Burgo, John (ed.). The Memoirs and Letter of Ulick, Marquis of Clanricarde, and Earl of St. Albans. London: R. and J. Dodsley. OCLC 1015530505.
- Cokayne, George Edward (1892). Complete Peerage of England, Scotland, Ireland, Great Britain and the United Kingdom, Extant, Extinct, or Dormant. Vol. IV (1st ed.). London: George Bell and Sons. OCLC 1180828941. – G to K (for Viscount Galway)
- Cokayne, George Edward (1913). Gibbs, Vicary (ed.). The complete peerage of England, Scotland, Ireland, Great Britain and the United Kingdom, extant, extinct, or dormant. Vol. III (2nd ed.). London: St Catherine Press. OCLC 228661424. – Canonteign to Cutts (for Clanricarde)
- Hawkins, Richard (October 2009). McGuire, James; Quinn, James (eds.). "Burke, Ulick". Dictionary of Irish Biography.
- O'Hart, John (1892). Irish Pedigrees: Or, the Origin and Stem of the Irish Nation. Vol. I (5th ed.). Dublin: James Duffy & Co. OCLC 7239210. – Irish stem
- Wauchope, Piers (2004). "Sarsfield, Patrick, Jacobite first earl of Lucan (d. 1693)". In Matthew, Colin; Harrison, Brian (eds.). Oxford Dictionary of National Biography. Vol. 48. New York: Oxford University Press. pp. 993–996. ISBN 0-19-861398-9.

Peerage of Ireland
New creation	Viscount Galway; 1687–1691	Extinct
