= William Burke, 7th Earl of Clanricarde =

Irish peer (died 1687)

William Burke
- Earl of Clanricarde
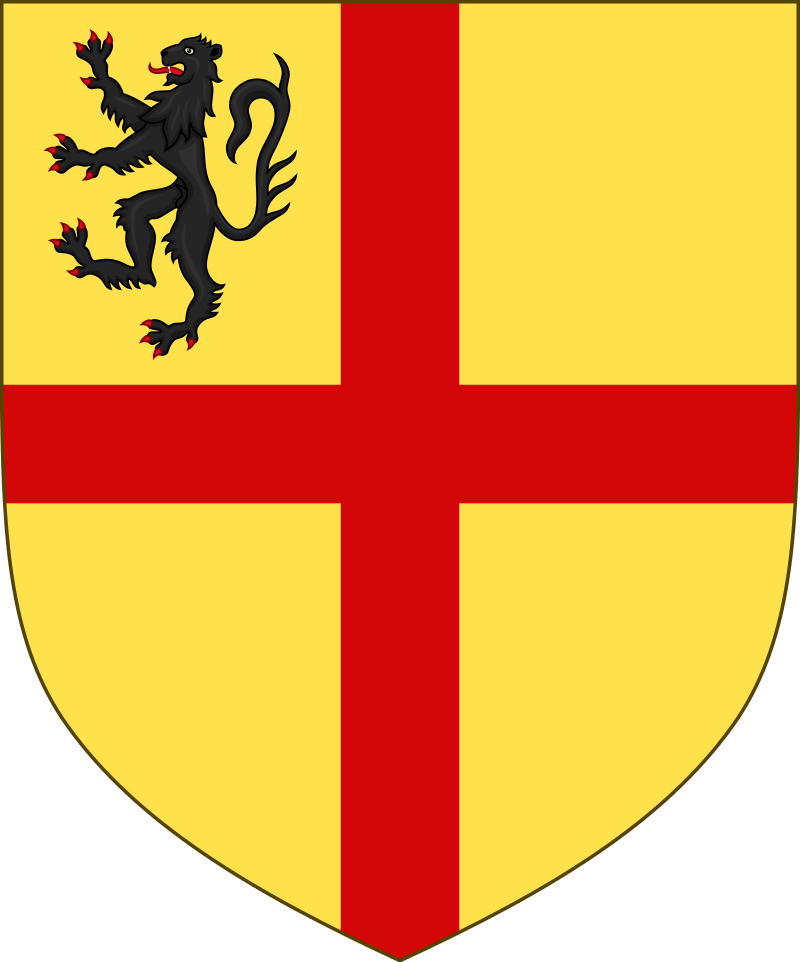
- Arms of de Burgh/Burke of Clanricarde (Note: Blazened: Or, a cross gules in the first quarter a lion rampant sable.)
- Tenure: 1666–1687
- Predecessor: Richard, 6th Earl of Clanricarde
- Successor: Richard, 8th Earl of Clanricarde
- Died: October 1687
- Spouses: 1. Lettice Shirley; 2. Helen MacCarty
- Issue Detail: Richard, John, & others
- Father: William Burke
- Mother: Joan O'Shaugnessy

William Burke, 7th Earl of Clanricarde, PC (Ire) (English: /klænˈrɪkɑːrd/ klan-RIK-ard; died October 1687), was an Irish peer who fought in his youth together with his brother Richard, 6th Earl of Clanricarde under their cousin, Ulick Burke, 1st Marquess of Clanricarde against the Parliamentarians in the Cromwellian conquest of Ireland. He succeeded his brother as the 7th Earl in 1666.

== Birth and origins ==
William was a younger son of Sir William Burke and his wife Joan. His father was the third son of Ulick Burke, 3rd Earl of Clanricarde. William's mother was a daughter of Dermot O'Shaugnessy of Gort.

William was the younger of two brothers:

1. Richard (died 1666), became the 6th Earl of Clanricarde
2. William (died 1687)

It is likely that he also had sisters, but nothing seems to be known about them.

Family tree

William Burke with his two wives, his parents, and selected relatives. (Note: Also see the lists of siblings and children in the text.)

Ulick; 3rd Earl d. 1601	Honora; Burke b. c. 1535
Richard; 4th Earl; 1572–1635	William; Burke d. 1626	Joan; O'Shaugh- nessy	Donough; 1st Earl; Clancarty; 1594–1665
Ulick; 1st Marquess; 1604–1657	Richard; 6th Earl d. 1666	Lettice; Shirley c. 1617 – 1655	William; 7th Earl d. 1687	Helen; MacCarty d. 1722
Richard; 8th Earl d. aft. 1708	John; 9th Earl; 1642–1722	Mary; Talbot d. 1711	Ulick; 1st Viscount; Galway; 1670–1691
Michael; 10th Earl; 1686–1726	Anne; Smith d. 1733

Legend

XXX	Subject of the article	XXX	Earls & Marquesses of Clanricarde	XXX	Earls of Clancarty

== First marriage ==
His first wife was Lettice Shirley, daughter of Sir Henry Shirley, 2nd Baronet, by Lady Dorothy Devereux and granddaughter of Robert Devereux, 2nd Earl of Essex. She was born about 1617 and died on 25 September 1655. They had three sons:

1. Richard (died after 1708), became the 8th Earl of Clanricarde;
2. John (1642–1722), became the 9th Earl of Clanricarde.
3. Thomas (died 1688), killed at the Siege of Buda, Hungary; (Note: Lodge by error ignores Clanricarde's second marriage to Helen and lists all the children as born by Lettice Shirley, his first wife.) (Note: There probably is some error here as the siege of Buda was in 1686.)

== Early life and Irish wars ==
During William's childhood his uncle Richard was Earl of Clanricarde, the 4th of his name. That uncle died on 12 November 1635 and was succeeded by his cousin Ulick as the 5th Earl and 1st Marquess. Ulick was neutral during the Irish Confederate Wars and fought the Parliamentarians during the Cromwellian Conquest of Ireland. He lost the Battle of Meelick Island in 1650 and surrendered to the Parliamentarians on 28 June 1652. He died in July 1657 and was succeeded by William's brother Richard as the 6th Earl of Clanricarde.

== Second marriage ==
Burke married secondly to Helen, widow of Sir John FitzGerald of Dromana and daughter of Donough MacCarty, 1st Earl of Clancarty. The date of this marriage is constrained by the death of her first husband in 1662 or 1664 and the birth of their eldest son in about 1670.

William and Helen had four children:

1. Ulick (1670–1691), was created Viscount of Galway and fell at the Battle of Aughrim fighting for the Jacobites;
2. Margaret (1673–1744), first married Bryan Magennis, 5th Viscount of Iveagh, and then Thomas Butler of Garryricken;
3. William, died childless in France;
4. Honora (c. 1675 – 1698), married 1st Patrick Sarsfield and 2nd the Duke of Berwick.
5. Thomas (d.1666)

== 7th Earl ==
In 1666 his elder brother Richard, the 6th Earl of Clanricarde, died and William eventually succeeded as the 7th Earl of Clanricarde. The date falls into the bracket of the not precisely known date of his second marriage.

== Late life, death, succession, and timeline ==
Clanricarde, as he now was, became Lord Lieutenant of Galway in 1680 and its Chief Governor in 1687. In 1681 he become a member of the Irish Privy Council.

Clanricarde died in October 1687 and was succeeded by his eldest son Richard as the 8th Earl of Clanricarde. His daughter Honora inherited a fortune of £3,500 from her father.

Timeline
As his birth date is uncertain, so are all his ages.
Age	Date	Event
0	1615, estimate	Born. (Note: His 1st wife was born about 1617; assuming she was 18 at that time, her marriage would be in 1635; assuming he was 20, gives 1615 as year of his birth.)
9–10	1625, 27 Mar	Accession of King Charles I, succeeding King James I
19–20	1635, 12 Nov	Cousin Ulick succeeds as the 5th Earl of Clanricarde.
33–34	1649, 30 Jan	King Charles I beheaded.
36–37	1652, 28 Jun	Cousin Ulick, Marquess of Clanricarde, surrendered to the Parliamentarians.
39–40	1655, Sep	His 1st wife dies.
41–42	1657, Jul	Brother Richard succeeded his cousin Ulick as the 6th Earl.
44–45	1660, 29 May	Restoration of King Charles II
50–51	1666, Aug	Succeeded his brother as the 7th Earl of Clanricarde.
54–55	1669, estimate	Married 2ndly Helen MacCarty.
54–55	1670, about	Son Ulick born.
57–58	1673	Daughter Margaret born.
58–59	1674	Daughter Honora born, his last child.
69–70	1685, 6 Feb	Accession of King James II, succeeding King Charles II
71–72	1687	Died

== See also ==
- House of Burgh, an Anglo-Norman and Hiberno-Norman dynasty founded in 1193

== Notes and references ==
=== Sources ===
- Burke, Bernard (1869). A Genealogical and Heraldic Dictionary of the Peerage and Baronetage of the British Empire (31st ed.). London: Harrison. OCLC 1045624502.
- Burke, Bernard; Burke, Ashworth Peter (1915). A Genealogical and Heraldic History of the Peerage and Baronetage, the Privy Council, Knightage and Companionage (77th ed.). London: Harrison. OCLC 1155471554. (for Clanricarde)
- Burke, Jim (2005). A History of De Burgo, De Burgh, De Burca, Burke, Bourke. Ireland: Séamus de Búrka. OCLC 619552006. – Jim Burke!
- Burke, John; Burke, Bernard (1844). Encyclopaedia of Heraldry, or General Armory of England, Scotland, and Ireland, Comprising a Registry of all Armorial Bearings from the Earliest to the Present Time (3rd ed.). London: Henry G. Bohn. – (Preview)
- Coffey, Diarmid (1914). O'Neill and Ormond – A Chapter of Irish History. Dublin: Maunsel & Company. OCLC 906164979.
- Cokayne, George Edward (1892). Complete Peerage of England, Scotland, Ireland, Great Britain and the United Kingdom, Extant, Extinct, or Dormant. Vol. IV (1st ed.). London: George Bell and Sons. OCLC 1180828941. – G to K (for Viscount Galway)
- Cokayne, George Edward (1913). Gibbs, Vicary (ed.). The complete peerage of England, Scotland, Ireland, Great Britain and the United Kingdom, extant, extinct, or dormant. Vol. III (2nd ed.). London: St Catherine Press. OCLC 228661424. – Canonteign to Cutts (for Clancarty and Clanricarde)
- Fryde, Edmund Boleslaw; Greenway, D. E.; Porter, S.; Roy, I., eds. (1986). Handbook of British Chronology. Royal Historical Society Guides and Handbooks, No. 2 (3rd ed.). London: Offices of the Royal Historical Society. ISBN 0-86193-106-8. – (for timeline)
- Hardy, William John (1913). Calendar of the State Papers, Domestic Series, of the Reign of William III. 1 January—31 December, 1696. London: His/Her Majesty's Stationery Office. OCLC 878147296. – 1696 (for Honora's inheritance)
- Lodge, John (1789). Archdall, Mervyn (ed.). The Peerage of Ireland or, A Genealogical History of the Present Nobility of that Kingdom. Vol. I. Dublin: James Moore. OCLC 264906028. – Blood royal, dukes, earls (for Clanricarde)

Peerage of Ireland
Preceded by Richard Burke	Earl of Clanricarde; 1666–1687	Succeeded by Richard Burke
