= Battle of Meelick Island =

Battle during the Irish Confederate Wars in 1650

Coordinates: 53.1688°N 8.0818°W

- Part of the Cromwellian Conquest of Ireland
Date	25 October 1650
Location	Meelick Island, Ireland
Result	Parliamentarian victory

Belligerents
Irish Confederates	Parliamentarians

Commanders and leaders
Marquess of Clanricarde	Colonel Daniel Axtell

Strength
4,000 foot 500 horse	3,000

Casualties and losses
1,000	Low

Ireland and Meelick Island

The Battle of Meelick Island took place on Meelick Island in the River Shannon, on the border between Connacht and Leinster in Ireland on 25 October 1650. It was fought between the Irish Confederates and the English Parliamentarians during the Irish Confederate Wars. The battle occurred when an English force under Colonel Daniel Axtell attacked the Connacht Irish army led by Ulick Burke, 1st Marquess of Clanricarde. The result was the rout of the Connacht army by Axtell's soldiers.

== Background ==
The Parliamentarian capture of the Castle at Tecroghan enabled the English to approach the borders of Connacht during the summer of 1650. This caused the Confederates into action pending the threat of invasion. Clanricarde was the leading Irish commander in the province and by August recognised as the de facto successor to Ormond as Lord-Lieutenant of Ireland. Clanricarde was a better diplomat than a military man as he had maintained peace in Connacht during the turmoil of the 1640s. As the English armies approached the borders of Connacht, Clanricarde organised an army of 3,000 men to support Lord Dillon's garrison at Athlone. When Ireton marched south from Athlone in late September and early October, Clanricarde launched a counter-attack across the River Shannon, with the intention of cutting English communications between Athlone and Limerick and denying them supplies from King's County.

Clanricarde's forces crossed the Shannon at fords around Shannonbridge (to the south of Athlone) in early October. The Connacht army quickly captured Ferbane Castle. Colonel Axtell, the English commander in the region, was forced over the River Brosna and then to Birr after some skirmishes between his regiment and the Irish army. Clanricarde's forces then seized some small English outposts. As Axtell's regiment retreated, Clanricarde was reinforced by James Preston, bringing the strength of his army up to just over 4,000 infantry and 500 cavalry. However, English reinforcements under Colonels Cook and Abbot quickly marched up from Wexford and Kilkenny to join Axtell at Roscrea on 21 October. When Axtell advanced towards Birr to challenge the Irish army, Clanricarde decided to withdraw and to take up formidable defensive positions on Meelick Island, a Crannog on the River Shannon.

== Battle ==
Soldiers were posted to overlook the ford that the English would have to cross in order to attack the Irish entrenchments on Meelick Island. Axtell however launched an attack as the light was fading on the evening of 25 October. The fighting was initially fierce, with clubbed muskets being used in close quarter fighting and soon the Irish were driven from the forward post guarding the ford. After the Parliamentarians gained a foothold on the island, the Irish were routed. Several hundred Irish soldiers were killed in the battle, many drowning in the waters of the Shannon as they tried to escape. The English captured Clanricarde's baggage train, including weapons, tents and many horses, though Burke himself escaped. The castle and posts taken by the Irish on the eastern side of the Shannon were quickly recaptured by the victorious Parliamentarians.

The rout at Meelick Island was a major blow to the Connacht Irish army, comparable to the loss of the Leinster army at Rathmines or the defeat of the Ulster army at Scarrifholis a few months before. Clanricarde attempted to put an army back together in subsequent months, but after this defeat he had great difficulty. After the battle it was alleged that Axtell's soldiers had executed many of the Irish soldiers after a promise of quarter. As a result, Axtell was court-martialled by Ireton and ordered to return to England.

== See also ==
- Confederate Ireland
- Irish battles

== General References ==
- Bagwell, Richard (1909), Ireland under the Stuarts and under the Interregnum, vol. 2, London: Longmans, Green, and Co.
- Wheeler, James Scott (1999). Cromwell in Ireland. Dublin: Gill & Macmillan. ISBN 0-7171-2884-9.
