= James Sarsfield, 2nd Earl of Lucan =

French-born Jacobite

James Sarsfield, 2nd Earl of Lucan (1693–1719), was a French-born Jacobite of Irish descent.

He was the only child of Patrick Sarsfield, 1st Earl of Lucan and his wife Honora Burke. His father was a leading commander of the Jacobite Irish Army during the Williamite War in Ireland, and led them into exile in the Flight of the Wild Geese following the Siege of Limerick in 1691. James was named after the young Jacobite Prince of Wales, James Francis Edward Stuart. His father was killed in 1693, at the Battle of Landen. The following year his mother remarried, to James FitzJames, 1st Duke of Berwick, the son of the exiled James II. Berwick raised James Sarsfield as his stepson. His half-brother was James Fitz-James Stuart, 2nd Duke of Berwick.

He served at the Siege of Barcelona in 1714 alongside Berwick, and was wounded in the final assault. In 1718 he was involved in a Jacobite plan to launch a rebellion and place James on the throne of Britain and Ireland. Sarsfield travelled to Ireland, but a series of military defeats in Scotland and at sea led to the withdrawal of the Jacobite plotters in May 1719. Shortly after arriving at St Omer, on 12 May 1719 he died. He was buried in the church of the Holy Sepulchre.

== Bibliography ==
- Wauchope, Piers. Patrick Sarsfield and the Williamite War. Irish Academic Press, 1992.
