= James Fitz-James Stuart, 2nd Duke of Berwick =

Spanish nobleman

Field Marshal James FitzJames Stuart
- Duke of Berwick
- Born: 21 October 1696; Saint Germain en Laye, France
- Died: 2 June 1738 (aged 41); Naples, Kingdom of Naples
- Noble family: FitzJames
- Spouses: Catalina Ventura de Portugal-Columbus, 9th Duquesa de Veragua y de La Vega
- Issue: Jacopo Stuart-FitzJames-Stuart y Colon de Portugal; James Fitz-James Stuart, 3rd Duke of Berwick; Pedro Stuart-FitzJames-Stuart y Colon de Portugal, Marques de San Leonardo; Catalina Stuart-FitzJames-Stuart y Colon de Portugal; Ventura Stuart-FitzJames-Stuart y Colon de Portugal; Maria Guadalupe Stuart-FitzJames-Stuart y Colon de Portugal
- Father: James FitzJames, 1st Duke of Berwick
- Mother: Honora de Burgh

James Francis (Jacobo Francisco) Fitz-James Stuart, 2nd Duke of Berwick, 2nd Duke of Liria and Xérica (21 October 1696 – 2 June 1738) was a Jacobite and Spanish nobleman.

He inherited titles in the Jacobite and Spanish nobility on the death of his father in battle in 1734 at Philippsburg, during the War of the Polish Succession. He was also Consort Duke of Veragua and of la Vega and a Consort-Marquis of four further titles by his Spanish marriage in 1716. His full title was 2nd Duke of Berwick, 2nd Earl of Tinmouth, 2nd Baron Bosworth, 2nd Duke of Liria and Xerica, Grandee of Spain 1st class (from 1716), Knight of the Order of the Golden Fleece (from 29 September 1714), as well as the holder of several earldoms.

== Family ==
His father was James FitzJames, 1st Duke of Berwick, an illegitimate son of King James II of England by Arabella Churchill, sister of the 1st Duke of Marlborough.

His mother was Lady Honora Burke, second daughter of William Burke, the seventh Earl of Clanricarde and widow of the Irish Jacobite nobleman Patrick Sarsfield, 1st Earl of Lucan. Sarsfield and Berwick were both veterans of James II's Irish Army and went into continental exile as part of the Flight of the Wild Geese.

Unfortunately, his mother died young at Pezenas, in the Languedoc, South of France, on the 16 January 1698, when he was less than 18 months old. His father later remarried and so the 2nd Duke of Berwick had 12 younger half brothers and half sisters, the eldest half brother being the origin of the line of French Dukes of Fitzjames (a title extinguished in 1967).

== Marriage and descent ==
On 31 December 1716, the 2nd Duke of Berwick became the second husband of the dowager Catalina Ventura Colón de Portugal y Ayala-Toledo, 9th Duchess of Veragua. Catalina Ventura was the daughter of Pedro Manuel Colon de Portugal y de la Cueva. This made the 2nd Duke of Berwick also duke-consort of Veragua and of la Vega.

They had six children, of whom four survived to adulthood:

- James Fitz-James Stuart, 3rd Duke of Berwick (28 December 1718 - 30 September 1785), who on 26 July 1738 married Maria Teresa De Silva y Haro.
- Pedro de Alcántara, (1720–1791), Captain general of the Spanish Navy, married María Benita de Rozas y Drummond, no issue.
- Ventura (1724–????), married María Josefa Gagigal y Monserrat, had one son.
- Maria Guadalupe (1725–1750), married to Francesco Maria Pico, Duke of Mirandola, but no issue.

== Career ==
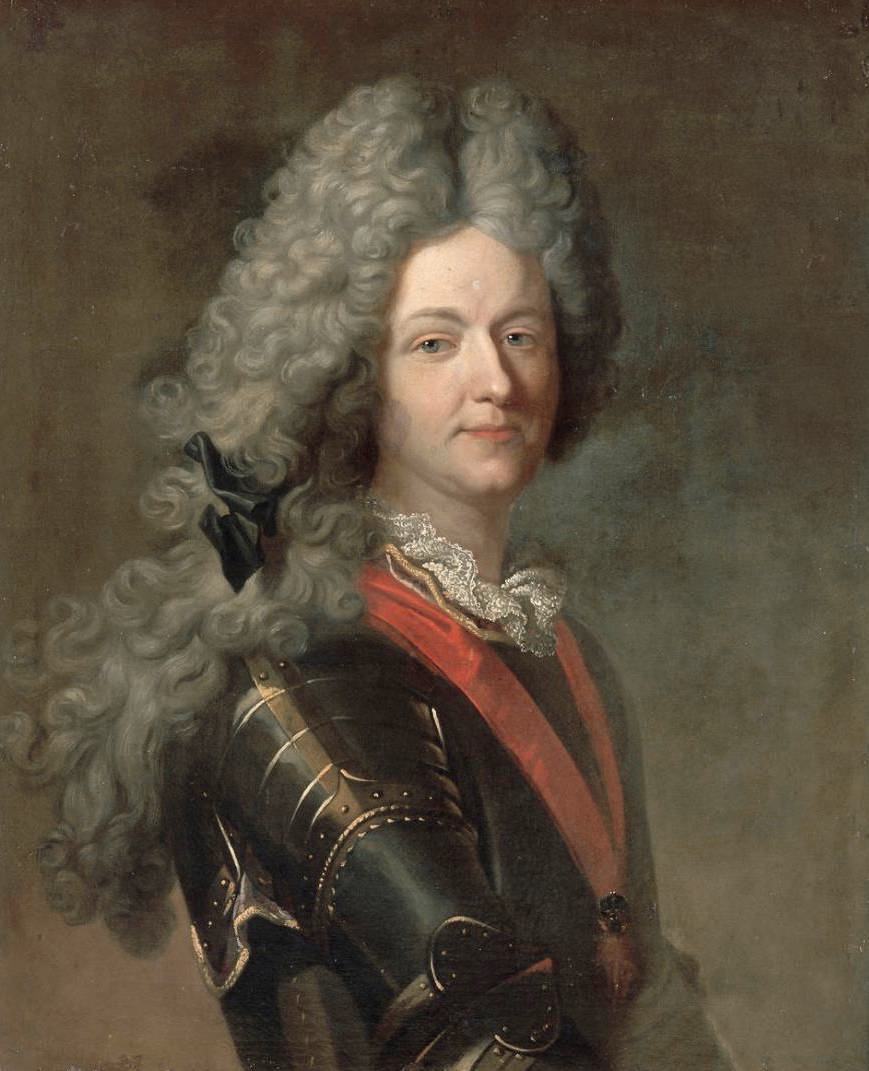
Portrait by Hyacinthe Rigaud

The Anglo-Franco-Spanish James Fitz-James Stuart was employed by Elizabeth of Parma to achieve her military purposes, being involved in the battles on land and sea from 1717 to 1719 to regain Naples from its Austrian rulers and Sicily from the Duchy of Savoy, thus creating the Kingdom of the Two Sicilies. He fought as colonel of the Irish Regiments of Spain and Lieutenant General of the Spanish Royal Armies, being promoted to Field Marshal in February 1724.

He then served as Spanish ambassador to Russia under Emperor Peter II (December 1726 to 1730), taking with him Ricardo Wall (1694–1777), later a minister in the Spanish government. During his time in Russia he was made a Knight of the Russian Order of Saint Andrew (28 March 1728), a Knight of the Russian Order of Saint Alexander Nevsky and a Knight of the Garter (by James Stuart on 3 April 1727). On 6 January 1728, he founded the Order of the Anti-Sober in Saint Petersburg. From 1730 to 1733 Stuart was ambassador in Vienna, then from 1733 to his death in 1738 ambassador to the "recovered" Kingdom of Naples (taking Wall with him again on both missions).

== Ancestry ==
James Fitz-James Stuart was a grandson of King James II of England by his illegitimate son James FitzJames, 1st Duke of Berwick whom he fathered with his mistress Arabella Churchill.

Ancestors of James Fitz-James Stuart, 2nd Duke of Berwick

16. James I of England
8. Charles I of England
17. Anne of Denmark
4. James II of England
18. Henry IV of France
9. Henrietta Maria of France
19. Marie de' Medici
2. James FitzJames, 1st Duke of Berwick
20. John Churchill
10. Winston Churchill
21. Sarah Winston
5. Arabella Churchill
22. John Drake
11. Elizabeth Drake
23. Eleanor Boteler
1. James Fitz-James Stuart, 2nd Duke of Berwick
24. Ulick de Burke, 3rd Earl of Clanricarde
12. Sir William Burke
25. Honora Burke
6. William Burke, 7th Earl of Clanricarde
26. Dermot O'Shaughnessy
13. Joan O'Shaughnessy
27. Shyly Ni Hubert
3. Honora Burke
28. Cormac Oge McCarthy, 1st Viscount Muskerry
14. Donough McCarthy, 1st Earl of Clancarty
29. Margaret O'Brien
7. Ellen McCarthy
30. Thomas Butler, Viscount Thurles
15. Eleanor Butler
31. Elizabeth Poyntz
