= John Burke, 9th Earl of Clanricarde =

Irish noble (1642–1722)

The Earl of Clanricarde
- Seaán de Búrca

Member of the Irish House of Lords
- Hereditary Peerage; 1709–1722
- Preceded by: Richard Burke
- Succeeded by: Michael Burke

Personal details
- Born: John Burke; 1642
- Died: 1722 (aged 79–80)
- Spouse: Mary Talbot (m. 1684; died 1711)
- Children: Several, including: Michael Burke, 10th Earl of Clanricarde
- Parents: William Burke, 7th Earl of Clanricarde; Lettice Shirley
- Relatives: Richard Burke, 8th Earl of Clanricarde (brother); Honora Burke (sister)
- Military career
- Allegiance: United Kingdom
- Branch: British Army
- Service years: 1689–1691
- Rank: Colonel
- Commands: Foot Regiment
- Conflicts: Williamite War in Ireland; Battle of Aughrim (1691)

John Burke, 9th Earl of Clanricarde (English: /klænˈrɪkɑːrd/ klan-RIK-ard; 1642–1722) was an Irish soldier and peer who was a colonel during the Williamite War in Ireland.

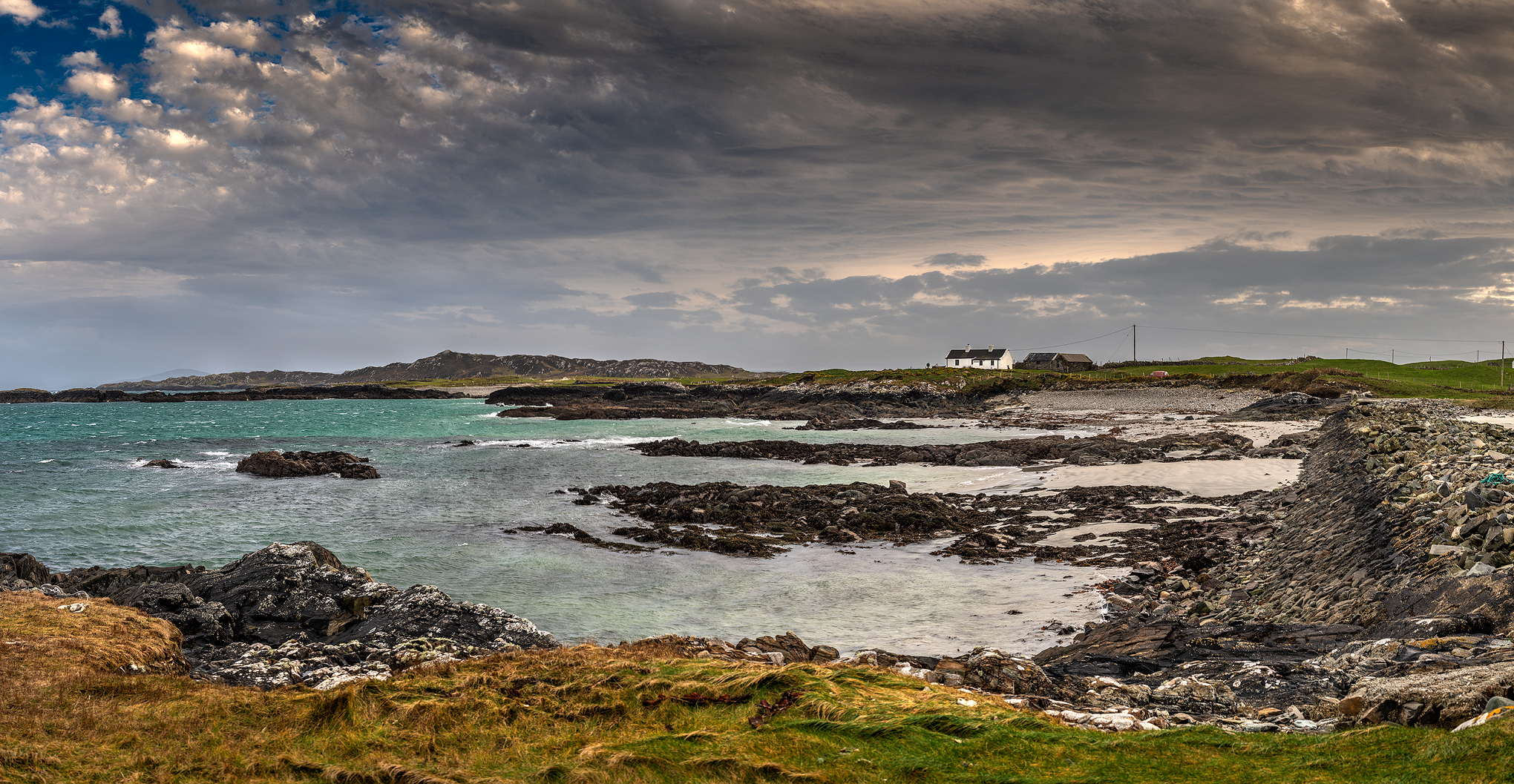
Inishbofin, Galway, Ireland.

== Career ==
Burke was a younger son of William Burke, 7th Earl of Clanricarde and succeeded his brother Richard. On 2 April 1689, he was created Baron Bourke of Boffin (over the Isle of Inishbofin where Burke is still a common surname amongst the islanders). This creation was made, in the Irish Peerage by the exiled James II, being one of seven peerages created four months after James's exclusion from the English throne. He commanded a foot regiment as its colonel during the Williamite War in Ireland. He was taken prisoner at the Battle of Aughrim on 12 July 1691 and outlawed. His younger brother Ulick Burke, 1st Viscount Galway was killed in the same battle.

Burke was attainted, and a bill for his restoration was rejected in 1698. In 1703, however, he obtained a reversal in return for a fine of twenty-five thousand pounds and the commitment that his two eldest sons, Michael and Ulick, would be raised as Protestants, after a private act of the English Parliament.

While Burke's elder sons, Michael and Ulick, conformed (to the Protestant faith), the younger Burkes remained Catholic and fought with the Wild Geese. Colonel Ulick Burke served the King of France, living as late as 1757. Lt. General Eamonn Burke was a member of the Irish regiment in Spain, and died at Bologna in 1744. William Burke was killed at Fontenoy in 1745. Burke's sister Honora Burke was married to the Jacobite soldier Patrick Sarsfield, 1st Earl of Lucan.

== Family ==
In October 1684, John Burke married Mary Talbot (d.1711), the daughter of James Talbot (d.1691). Their children were:

- Michael Burke, 10th Earl of Clanricarde (1686–1726)
- Lady Bridget Bourke (died 1779) who married Richard Dillon, 9th Viscount Dillon (1688-1737)
- Lady Lætitia Bourke (died 1740) who married Sir Festus Burke, 5th Baronet
- Hon. Ulick de Burgh (d.1762)
- Lady Honora Bourke who married John Kelly
- Lady Mary Bourke (died 1735) who married Garret Moore
- Hon. James Bourke (died 1718)
- Hon. Richard Bourke
- Lady Margaret Bourke
- Hon. William Bourke (died 1703)
- Hon. Thomas de Burgh (died 1763)
- Hon. Edward Bourke (died 1743)
- Hon. William Bourke (died 1745)
- Hon. John Bourke (died 1718)

== Arms ==
Coat of arms of John Burke, 9th Earl of Clanricarde
| Crest A Cat-a-Mountain sejant guardant proper, collared and chained Or. Escutcheon Or, a cross gules in the first quarter a lion rampant sable. Supporters Two Cats-a-Mountain sejant guardant proper, collared and chained Or. Motto UNG ROY, UNG FOY, UNG LOY (One king, one faith, one law) |

== Ancestry ==
Ancestors of John Burke, 9th Earl of Clanricarde

8. Ulick Burke, 3rd Earl of Clanricarde
4. Sir William Burke
9. Honora Burke
2. William Burke, 7th Earl of Clanricarde
10. Dermot O'Shaughnessy
5. Joan O'Shaughnessy
11.
1. John Burke, 9th Earl of Clanricarde
12. George Shirley, 1st Baronet
6. Henry Shirley, 2nd Baronet
13. Frances Berkeley
3. Lettice Shirley
14. Robert Devereux, 2nd Earl of Essex
7. Lady Dorothy Devereux
15. Frances Walsingham

== See also ==
- House of Burgh, an Anglo-Norman and Hiberno-Norman dynasty founded in 1193

Peerage of Ireland
| Preceded by Richard Burke | Earl of Clanricarde; 1708–1722 | Succeeded by Michael Burke |
