= Richard Burke, 8th Earl of Clanricarde =

Irish noble (d. after 1708)

The Earl of Clanricarde PC (Ire)
- Ricard de Búrca

Member of the Irish House of Lords
- Hereditary Peerage; October 1687 – 1709
- Preceded by: William Burke
- Succeeded by: John Burke

Personal details
- Born: Richard Burke
- Died: 1709
- Spouses: Elizabeth Bagnall; Anne Cheeke; Bridget Dillon
- Children: Lady Dorothy Bourke; Lady Mary Bourke
- Parents: William Burke, 7th Earl of Clanricarde; Lettice Shirley
- Relatives: John Burke, 9th Earl of Clanricarde (brother); Honora Burke (sister)
- Military career
- Allegiance: United Kingdom
- Branch: British Army
- Service years: 1689–1691
- Rank: Colonel
- Commands: Infantry Regiment
- Conflicts: Williamite War in Ireland; Battle of Aughrim (1691)

Richard Burke, 8th Earl of Clanricarde PC (Ire) (English: /klænˈrɪkɑːrd/ klan-RIK-ard; died 1709); styled Lord Dunkellin (/dʌnˈkɛlɪn/ dun-KEL-in) until 1687; was an Irish peer who served as Custos Rotulorum of Galway.

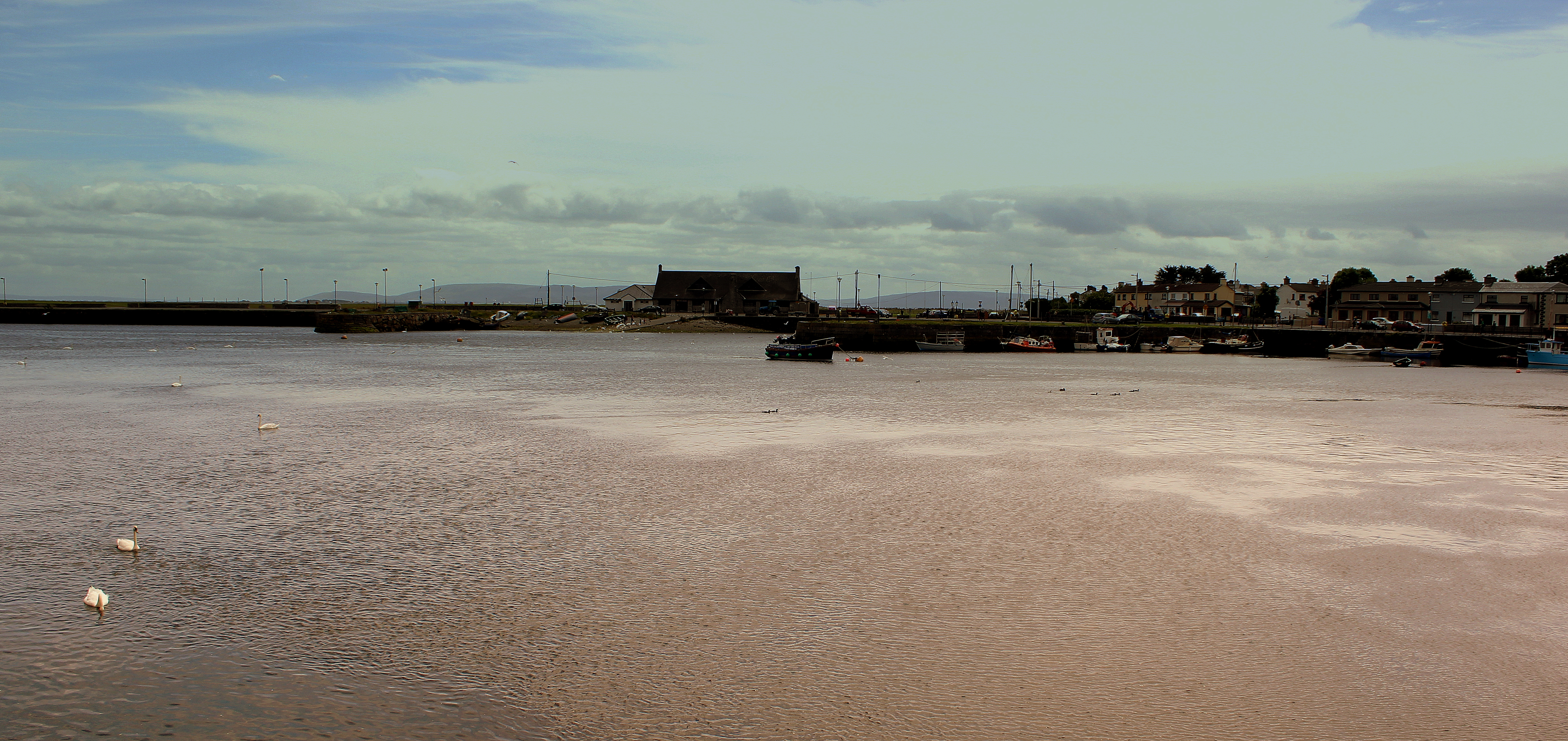
Galway Harbour

== Career ==
Richard was the elder son of William Burke, 7th Earl of Clanricarde and appears to have been the first of the family to conform (to the Protestant faith), as Charles II wrote to his father congratulating him on "being thoroughly instructed in the protestant religion as it stands established, having forsaken that of Rome which hath always given jealousies to the crown". He was made Baron Dunkellin in 1680.

Clanricarde was appointed Governor and Custos Rotulorum of County Galway, and commanded a regiment of infantry during the Williamite War in Ireland. He surrendered the town of Galway in July 1690. His younger brother, Ulick, commanded a regiment of foot at the Battle of Aughrim where he was killed, aged twenty-two. Richard was outlawed on 11 May 1691. His sister Honora was married to the Jacobite leader Patrick Sarsfield.

== Family ==
Richard married three times. Firstly, he married Elizabeth Bagnall. They had a daughter:

- Lady Dorothy Bourke. She was educated at Priest's School, Chelsea, where she performed in Purcell's Dido and Aeneas. She married Alexander Pendarves

Secondly, he married Anne Cheke, Dowager Countess of Warwick, the daughter of Sir Thomas Cheke (d.1659), and widow of Richard Rogers and Robert Rich, 3rd Earl of Warwick (1611–59). Their daughter was:

- Lady Mary Bourke (d.1714)

Thirdly, he married Bridget Dillon, daughter of Henry Dillon, 8th Viscount Dillon.

Without a male heir, Richard was succeeded, as Earl, by his brother John.

== Honours and Arms ==
=== Honours ===
Country	Date	Appointment	Ribbon	Post-nominals
United Kingdom	1688	Member of the Privy Council of Ireland		PC (Ire)

=== Arms ===
Coat of arms of Richard Burke, 8th Earl of Clanricarde
Crest A Cat-a-Mountain sejant guardant proper, collared and chained Or. Escutcheon Or, a cross gules in the first quarter a lion rampant sable. Supporters Two Cats-a-Mountain sejant guardant proper, collared and chained Or. Motto UNG ROY, UNG FOY, UNG LOY (One king, one faith, one law)

== Ancestry ==
Ancestors of Richard Burke, 8th Earl of Clanricarde

8. Ulick Burke, 3rd Earl of Clanricarde
4. Sir William Burke
9. Honora Burke
2. William Burke, 7th Earl of Clanricarde
10. Dermot O'Shaughnessy
5. Joan O'Shaughnessy
11.
1. Richard Burke, 8th Earl of Clanricarde
12. George Shirley, 1st Baronet
6. Henry Shirley, 2nd Baronet
13. Frances Berkeley
3. Lettice Shirley
14. Robert Devereux, 2nd Earl of Essex
7. Lady Dorothy Devereux
15. Frances Walsingham

== See also ==
- House of Burgh, an Anglo-Norman and Hiberno-Norman dynasty founded in 1193

Peerage of Ireland
Preceded by William Burke	Earl of Clanricarde; 1687–1709	Succeeded by John Burke
