= Richard Burke, 6th Earl of Clanricarde =

Irish peer (died 1666)

The Earl of Clanricarde
- Ricard de Búrca

Member of the Irish House of Lords
- Hereditary Peerage; July 1657 – August 1666
- Preceded by: Ulick Burke
- Succeeded by: William Burke

Personal details
- Born: Richard Burke
- Died: 1666
- Spouse: Elizabeth Butler
- Children: Lady Margaret Burke; Lady Mary Burke
- Parents: Sir William Burke; Joan O'Shaughnessy
- Relatives: William Burke, 7th Earl of Clanricarde (brother)

Richard Burke, 6th Earl of Clanricarde (English: /klænˈrɪkɑːrd/ klan-RIK-ard; died August 1666) was an Irish peer.

== Career ==
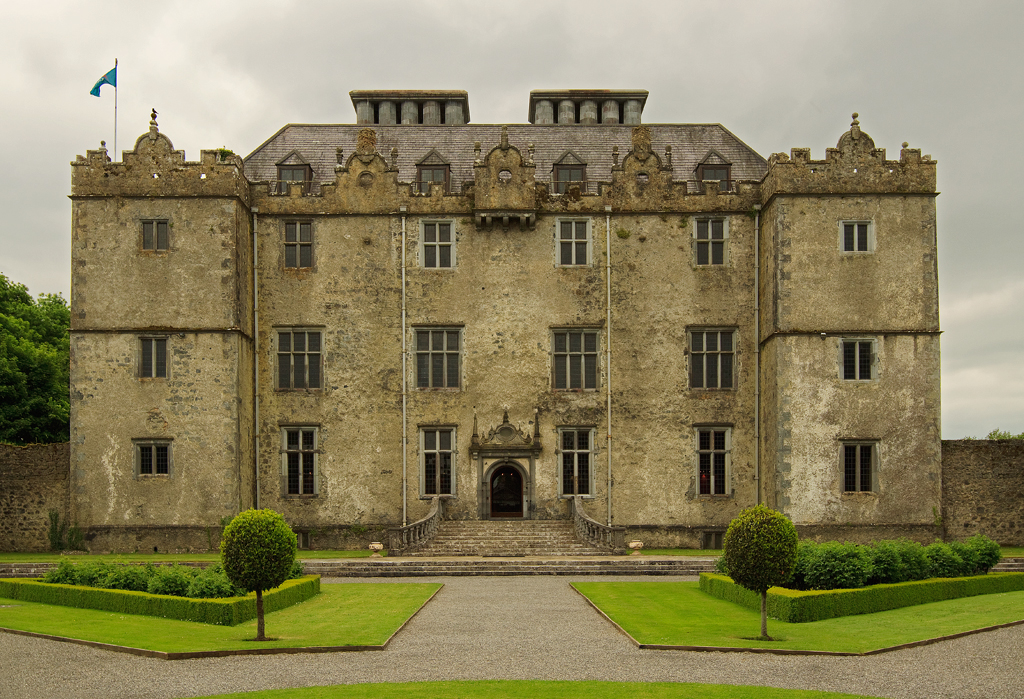
Seat of the Earls of Clanricarde, Portumna Castle, County Galway

Richard was the eldest son of Sir William Burke and Joan O'Shaughnessy. He was a first cousin to the previous Earl and had served under him in the royalist forces during the Irish Confederate Wars. When restored, the Clanricarde estates were heavily in debt and a great deal of litigation was ongoing between the interested parties.

== Family ==
Richard married Elizabeth Butler, one of the many daughters of Walter Butler, 11th Earl of Ormond. It was the second marriage for Elizabeth, who was the widow of Sir Edmond Blanchville of County Kilkenny. They had two daughters:

- Lady Margaret Bourke, who married Col. Garret Moore (d.1706)
- Lady Mary Bourke (d.1685), who married (1) Sir John Burke; and (2) Edward de Bermingham (d.1709).

Richard was succeeded, as Earl, by his brother, William.

== Arms ==
Coat of arms of Richard Burke, 6th Earl of Clanricarde
Crest A Cat-a-Mountain sejant guardant proper, collared and chained Or. Escutcheon Or, a cross gules in the first quarter a lion rampant sable. Supporters Two Cats-a-Mountain sejant guardant proper, collared and chained Or. Motto UNG ROY, UNG FOY, UNG LOY (One king, one faith, one law)

== Ancestry ==
Ancestors of Richard Burke, 6th Earl of Clanricarde

8. Richard Burke, 2nd Earl of Clanricarde
4. Ulick Burke, 3rd Earl of Clanricarde
9. Margaret O'Brien
2. Sir William Burke
10. John Burke of Clogheroka
5. Honora Burke
11.
1. Richard Burke, 6th Earl of Clanricarde
12.
6. Dermot O'Shaughnessy
13.
3. Joan O'Shaughnessy
14.
7.
15.

== See also ==
- House of Burgh, an Anglo-Norman and Hiberno-Norman dynasty founded in 1193

Peerage of Ireland
Preceded by Ulick Burke	Earl of Clanricarde; 1657–1666	Succeeded by William Burke
