= Ursula St Barbe =

Elizabethan lady

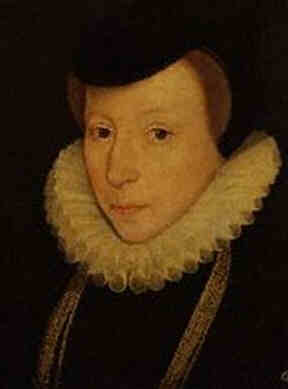
Portrait said to be of Ursula St Barbe, by an unknown artist, 1583

Ursula St Barbe (died 18 June 1602), also known as Ursula, Lady Worsley and Ursula, Lady Walsingham, was an English lady at the court of Queen Elizabeth I of England in the late 1500s.

== Biography ==
St Barbe was the daughter of Henry St Barbe (1504–1567), of Ashington, Somerset, by his wife, Eleanor St Barbe (née Lewknor, 1513–1590). Her uncle Sir William St Barbe (1499–1562), was a gentleman of the Privy Chamber.

St Barbe firstly married Sir Richard Worsley, who was the captain of the Isle of Wight. After his death, she married Sir Francis Walsingham in 1566. Walsingham was principal secretary to Queen Elizabeth I of England.

The following year, St Barbe's two sons by Worsley, John and George, were killed along with others in an accidental gunpowder explosion at the Worsley estate on the Isle of Wight, Appuldurcombe. Gunpowder had been laid out to dry in the gatehouse, where the boys had lessons, when a stray spark ignited it.

With Walsingham, Ursula had two daughters: Frances, who was born in about October 1567 and was married three times, and Mary, who was born in early January 1573 and died in 1580.

Walsingham was appointed as ambassador to France and St Barbe and her daughter Frances moved with him to Paris. During Walsingham's time as ambassador, the St. Bartholomew's Day Massacre of Huguenots took place in August 1572. The Walsingham house in Paris acted as a refuge for French Protestants during the terror. As soon as it was deemed safe, Ursula, who was pregnant at the time, and her daughter Frances fled to England. Two of her guards were beaten at the city gate as she left Paris. St Barbe was reunited with her husband in April 1573.

Her husband was acquainted with the mathematician and astrologer John Dee, and her daughter Frances stood godmother to Dee's daughter Madima. Ursula's sister, Edith, was the wife of Robert Beale, clerk of the Privy Council, although the date of their marriage is unknown. He wrote the official record of the execution of Mary, Queen of Scots, to which he was an eyewitness.

Ursula Walsingham was widowed in 1590. At his death he was in debt and was buried privately with no heralds at his funeral. In 1600, Lady Walsingham gave Elizabeth a New Year's Day gift of a "petticoat of clay coloured satin, embroidered all over with branches of silver".

After the execution of her daughter Frances' second husband Robert Devereux, 2nd Earl of Essex on 25 February 1601, Frances lived with her mother until she died. Lady Walsingham died at her home in Barn Elms on 18 June 1602, and was buried the following night in Old St Paul's Cathedral, London.

Following her mothers death, Frances married for a third time to Richard Burke, 4th Earl of Clanricarde.

== Issue ==
With Sir Richard Worsley:

- John Worsley
- George Worsley

With Sir Francis Walsingham:

- Frances Burke, Countess of Clanricarde (1567 – 17 February 1633), married firstly to Sir Philip Sidney; married secondly to Robert Devereaux, 2nd Earl of Essex; married thirdly to Richard Burke, 4th Earl of Clanricard.
- Mary Walsingham (January 1573 – 1580)
