= Ulick Burke, 3rd Earl of Clanricarde =

Irish peer (died 1601)

Ulick Burke
- Earl of Clanricarde
- Tenure: 1582–1601
- Predecessor: Richard Burke, 2nd Earl of Clanricarde
- Successor: Richard Burke, 4th Earl of Clanricarde
- Died: 20 May 1601; Loughrea, County Galway, Ireland
- Buried: Athenry, County Galway
- Spouse: Honora Burke
- Issue Detail: Richard, & others
- Father: Richard, 2nd Earl of Clanricarde
- Mother: Margaret O'Brien

Ulick Burke, 3rd Earl of Clanricarde (English: /ˈjuːlɪk ... klænˈrɪkɑːrd/ YOO-lik ... klan-RIK-ard; died 20 May 1601), styled Lord Dunkellin (/dʌnˈkɛlɪn/ dun-KEL-in) until 1582, was an Irish peer who was the son of Richard Burke, 2nd Earl of Clanricarde and Margaret O'Brien.

== Birth and origins ==
Family tree

Ulick Burke with wife, parents, and selected relatives. (Note: Also see the lists of siblings and children in the text.)

Grace; O'Carroll	Ulick; 1st Earl d. 1544	Mary; Lynch
Richard; 2nd Earl d. 1582	Margaret; O'Brien
Ulick; 3rd Earl d. 1601	Honora; Burke b. c. 1535
Richard; 4th Earl; 1572–1635	Frances; Walsingham	William; Burke d. 1626	Joan; O'Shaugh- nessy
Ulick; 1st Marquess; 1604–1657	Richard; 6th Earl d. 1666	William; 7th Earl d. 1687	Lettice; Shirley c. 1617 – 1655

Legend

XXX	Subject of the article	XXX	Earls & Marquesses of Clanricarde

Ulick was the only son of Richard Burke and his wife Margaret O'Brien. His father was the 2nd earl of Clanricarde, called the Saxon (or Sassanach), because he succeeded by primogeniture. His mother was a daughter of Murrough O'Brien, 1st Earl of Thomond.

== Career ==
He had long been a rebel against the English Crown, and since the 1560s had instigated the Mac an Iarla against his father, who was a staunch supporter of Elizabeth I. These wars devastated large areas in Connaught and Thomond.

On his father's death in 1582 it was uncertain who would inherit the title, Ulick or his brother, John. Ulick gained the succession by murdering John and acknowledging the supremacy of the Crown. He afterwards remained a loyal subject till his death on 20 May 1601 at Loughrea. He was buried at Athenry.

== Marriage and children ==
Clanricarde, as he now was, married Honora Burke, daughter of John Burke of Clogheroka, on 25 November 1564 at Athenry, County Galway.

Ulick and Honora had six sons:

1. Richard (died an infant)
2. Richard Burke, 4th Earl of Clanricarde (1572–1635)
3. Thomas, who married Ursula Malby, daughter of Sir Nicholas Malby and widow of Anthony Brabazon
4. William (died 1625), from whom later Earls descended
5. Edmond Burke (died 1639)

—and at least two daughters:

1. Mary (c. 1566 – before July 1604)
2. Margarey de Burgh who married Sir John Bourke

Clanricarde also had an illegitimate son with Martha Frannas:

- John Burke, 1st Viscount Bourke of Clanmories (before 1601 – 1633)

== Arms ==
Coat of arms of Ulick Burke, 3rd Earl of Clanricarde
Crest A Cat-a-Mountain sejant guardant proper, collared and chained Or. Escutcheon Or, a cross gules in the first quarter a lion rampant sable. Supporters Two Cats-a-Mountain sejant guardant proper, collared and chained Or. Motto UNG ROY, UNG FOY, UNG LOY (One king, one faith, one law)

== See also ==
- House of Burgh, an Anglo-Norman and Hiberno-Norman dynasty founded in 1193

== Notes and references ==
=== Sources ===
- "Burke, Ulick | Dictionary of Irish Biography". www.dib.ie.
- Burke, Bernard; Burke, Ashworth Peter (1915). A Genealogical and Heraldic History of the Peerage and Baronetage, the Privy Council, Knightage and Companionage (77th ed.). London: Harrison. OCLC 1155471554.
- Cokayne, George Edward (1913). Gibbs, Vicary (ed.). The Complete Peerage of England, Scotland, Ireland, Great Britain and the United Kingdom, extant, extinct, or dormant. Vol. III (2nd ed.). London: St Catherine Press. OCLC 228661424. – Canonteign to Cutts (for Clanricarde)

Peerage of Ireland
Preceded by Richard Burke	Earl of Clanricarde; 1582–1601	Succeeded by Richard Burke
