= Frances Walsingham =

English noblewoman (born 1567)

- Lady Sidney (1583–1590), Countess of Essex (1590–1603), Countess of Clanricade (1603–1633)
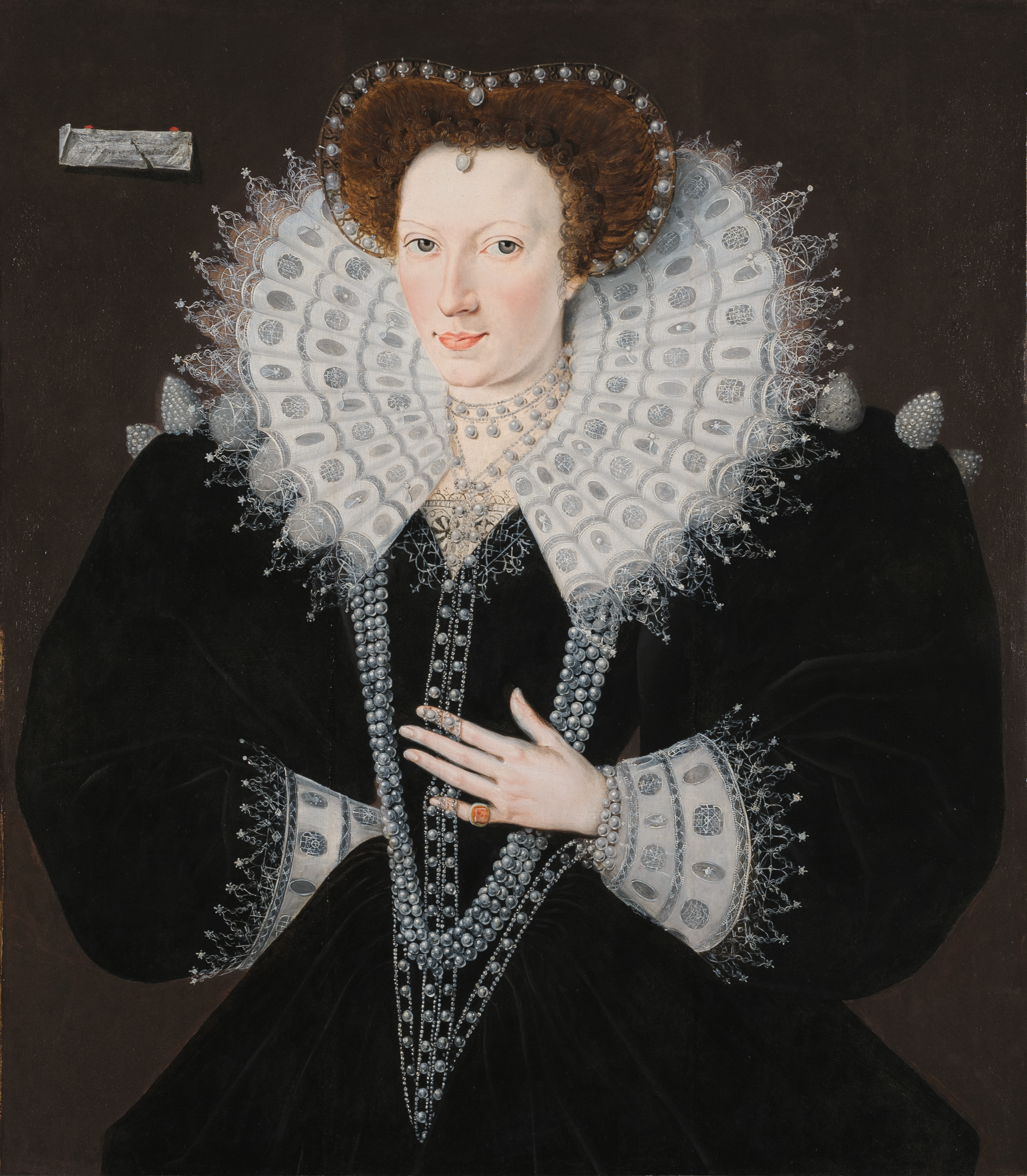
- Frances Walsingham, Lady Sidney, attributed to Robert Peake the Elder, 1586-1590
- Born: Frances Walsingham; 1567; England
- Died: 17 February 1633 (aged 65–66); Kent, England
- Buried: Tonbridge
- Spouses: Philip Sidney (m. 1583; died 1586) Robert Devereux (m. 1590; died 1601) Richard Burke (m. 1603)
- Issue: Elizabeth Manners, Countess of Rutland; The 3rd Earl of Essex; Lady Dorothy Devereux; Frances, Duchess of Somerset; The 1st Marquess of Clanricarde; Honora Paulet, Marchioness of Winchester
- Father: Sir Francis Walsingham
- Mother: Ursula St. Barbe

Frances Burke, Countess of Clanricarde (née Walsingham, formerly Devereux and Sidney; 1567 – 17 February 1633) was an English noblewoman. The daughter of Sir Francis Walsingham, Elizabeth I's Secretary of State, she became the wife of Sir Philip Sidney at age 16. Her second husband was Queen Elizabeth's favourite, Robert Devereaux, Earl of Essex, with whom she had five children. Two years after his execution in 1601, she married Richard Burke, Earl of Clanricarde, and went to live with him in Ireland.

== Family and first marriage ==
She was the only surviving child of Sir Francis Walsingham, Secretary of State for Queen Elizabeth I, and Ursula St. Barbe. A lady-in-waiting to Queen Elizabeth, she married Philip Sidney in 1583, a match arranged by her father over the objections of the Queen, possibly because she did not like the prospect of two close councillors forming a power block (Sidney was nephew to Robert, Earl of Leicester). Sidney was appointed Governor of Flushing and left to attend his duties in the Netherlands, but pregnant with her first child, Frances waited until she had given birth. Her daughter was born in 1585 and named Elizabeth after the Queen, who had forgiven the couple and was one of the godparents. In June 1586 Frances left England for the Netherlands to meet her husband. On 22 September, Sidney was injured at the battle of Zutphen, and the wound became infected. Frances, again pregnant, nursed him, but he died on 17 October. She brought his body back to England, where he was given a hero's funeral, but miscarried their child.

== Second marriage ==
In 1590 Frances' father died, leaving her with an annuity of £300; she married again, to Robert Devereux, 2nd Earl of Essex, to whom her previous husband had left his "best sword." The match may have been arranged by her father and took place before he died, however it caused great displeasure to the Queen, (although she forgave them relatively quickly) partly because the couple had not asked for permission beforehand.

Frances had three children who survived infancy with her second husband, these were named Frances, Robert and Dorothy. Her husband Robert was executed in 1601 after participating in an attempted coup against the Queen. Frances attempted to see the queen to plead on his behalf, but was not permitted to see her. Her son became the third Earl of Essex.

== Third marriage ==
In 1603, she married her third husband Richard De Burgh (or Burke), Earl of St Albans and Clanricarde. They had one son, Ulick, and two daughters; the first, Honora, and the second known as Margaret or Mary.

Together they lived in both Ireland and England, building great houses in each country. In 1609 they built a mansion at Somerhill in Kent, and around 1618 the construction of Portumna Castle in County Galway, Ireland began.

She died early in 1633 at Somerhill, and was buried at St Peter and St Paul, Tonbridge, where she and her husband have effigies.

== Children ==
By Sir Phillip Sidney

- Elizabeth Sidney (1585–1612). Married Roger Manners, 5th Earl of Rutland, in March 1599 and died without issue.

By Robert Devereux, Earl of Essex

- Robert (1592–1646) later 3rd Earl of Essex
- Penelope (b. 1593/4, bur. 27 June 1599)
- Henry (bap. 14 April 1595, d. 7 May 1596)
- Stillbirths in 1596 and 1598.
- Frances (b. 30 September 1599 – 1674), later Duchess of Somerset
- Dorothy (b. c.20 Dec 1600), later Lady Shirley

By Richard Burke, Earl of Clanricarde

- Ulick (1604–1657) later Earl, then Marquess of Clanricarde
- Honora (1610–1661) m. John Paulet, 5th Marquess of Winchester c. 1645
- Margaret/Mary m. Hon. Edward Butler of Ballinahinch
