= Earl of Clanricarde =

Title in the Peerage of Ireland

Earldom of Clanricarde Iarla na Clanricard
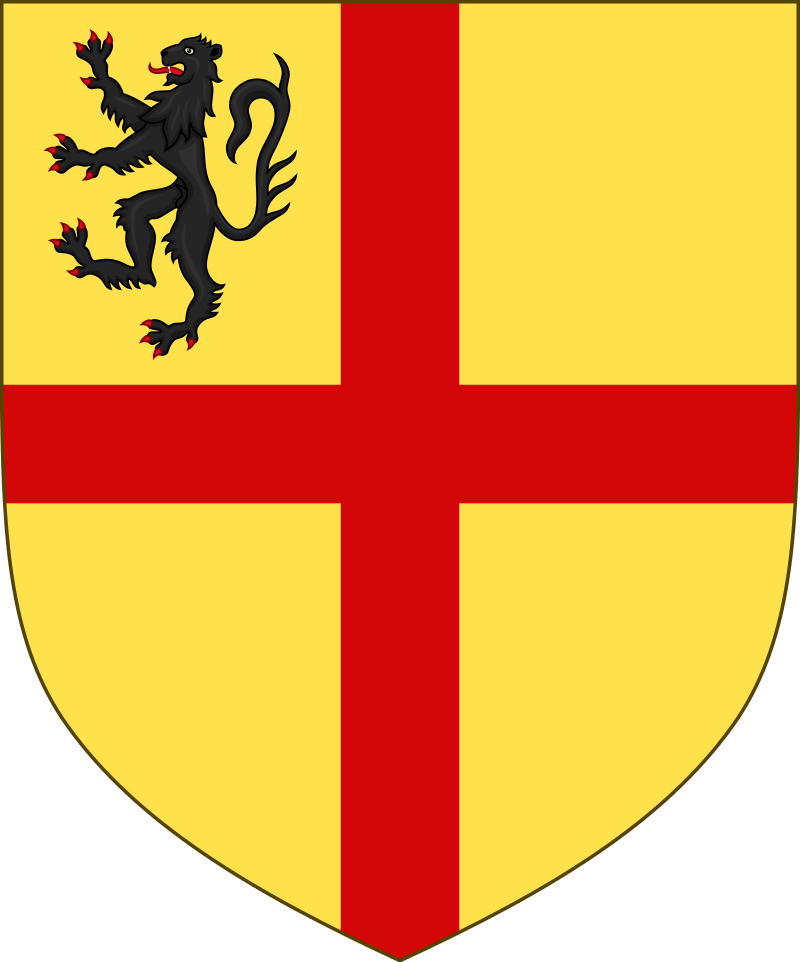
- Arms: of de Burgh/Burke: Or, a cross gules in the first quarter a lion rampant sable.
- Creation date: 1543 (1st creation); 1800 (2nd creation)
- Created by: Henry VIII
- Peerage: Peerage of Ireland
- First holder: Ulick Burke, 1st Earl of Clanricarde
- Present holder: Sebastian Browne, 12th Marquess of Sligo
- Heir apparent: Christopher Browne, Earl of Altamont and Clanricarde
- Remainder to: 1st creation: 1st Earl's heirs male 2nd creation: 13th Earl's heirs male, with remainder to heirs male of his daughters
- Subsidiary titles: Earl of St Albans (E: 1628); Viscount Tunbridge (E: 1624); Viscount Galway (E: 1628); Viscount Bourke of Clanmories (I: 1629); Baron of Dunkellin (I: 1543); Baron of Somerhill (E: 1624); Baron of Imanney (E: 1628); Baron Somerhill (UK: 1826); Baron Bourke of Bophin (I: 1689)
- Status: Extant (2nd creation)
- Extinction date: 1916 (1st creation)
- Seat: Portumna Castle
- Former seat: Somerhill House
- Motto: UNG ROY, UNG FOY, UNG LOY (One king, one faith, one law)

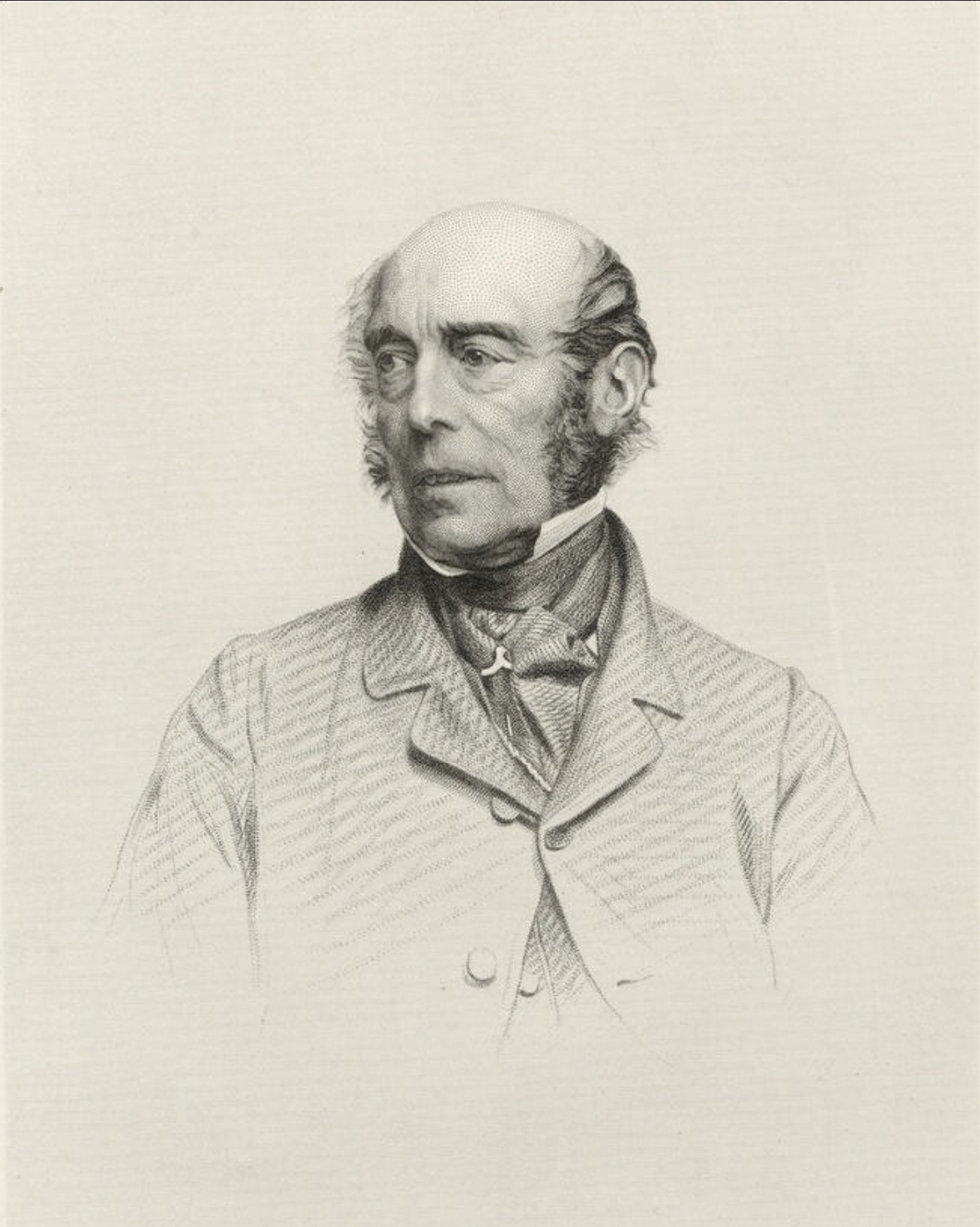
Ulick, 1st Marquess of Clanricarde (by the third and final creation). Ulick was also the 14th Earl of Clanricarde.

Earl of Clanricarde (English: /klænˈrɪkɑːrd/ klan-RIK-ard; Irish: Iarla na Clanricard) is a title that has been created twice in the Peerage of Ireland, first in 1543 and again in 1800. The former creation became extinct in 1916 while the 1800 creation is extant and held by the Marquess of Sligo since 1916.

Clanricarde (or Lord of Clanricarde) was a Gaelic title meaning "(head of) Richard's family" (also known as Mac William Uachtar/Upper Mac William) and this family were descended from Richard Mór de Burgh, 1st Lord of Connacht (d.1243), son of William de Burgh (d.1205/6), founder of the de Burgh/Burke family in Ireland.

In 1543, Ulick na gCeann Burke, 12th Clanricarde, was created Baron of Dunkellin (/dʌnˈkɛlɪn/ dun-KEL-in) and Earl of Clanricarde in the Peerage of Ireland. The baronial title was derived from Dunkellin which was one of the family's major baronies in County Galway. His great-grandson, the fourth Earl, was created Baron of Somerhill and Viscount Tunbridge in the Peerage of England in 1624, Baron of Imanney and Viscount Galway in the Peerage of Ireland and Earl of St Albans in the Peerage of England in 1628. The first two titles were derived from the Earl's new residence of Somerhill House near Tonbridge, Kent. Imanney (pronounced English: /ɪˈmɑːrnɪ/ i-MARN-i;) was derived from Uí Mháine (anglicised as Hy-Many) the largest ancient kingdom in Connacht. His son, Ulick Burke, the fifth Earl, was a prominent Royalist during the Civil War. In 1646 he was created Marquess of Clanricarde in the Peerage of Ireland. In c.1650 he also succeeded his cousin as third Viscount Bourke of Clanmories according to a special remainder in the letters patent (see below). On his death, in 1657, the marquessate and the English titles became extinct. However, he was succeeded in the Irish titles by his second cousin, the sixth Earl. He was the son of The Hon. Sir William Bourke, third son of the third Earl. He died without male issue and was succeeded by his younger brother, the seventh Earl.

His younger son, the ninth Earl (who succeeded his elder brother Richard), fought in the army of James II of England (VII of Scotland), was created by him as Baron Bourke of Bophin in 1689, deriving the title from Lough Bofin in Connemara, County Galway. He was taken prisoner at the Battle of Aughrim in 1691. He was outlawed and attainted with his estates forfeited. However, in 1701, Lord Clanricarde was acquitted by Act of Parliament and restored to his estates. His grandson, the eleventh Earl, assumed the ancient surname of de Burgh in lieu of Burke (or Bourke). His eldest son, the twelfth Earl, was created Marquess of Clanricarde in the Peerage of Ireland in 1789. He was childless and on his death the marquessate became extinct. He was succeeded in the other titles by his younger brother, the thirteenth Earl. He was a general in the British Army. Lord Clanricarde was elected as one of the 28 original Irish representative peer in 1800. The same year, he was created Earl of Clanricarde (second creation) in the Peerage of Ireland, with remainder, failing male issue of his own, to his daughters Lady Hester Catherine de Burgh (wife of Howe Browne, 2nd Marquess of Sligo) and Lady Emily de Burgh, and the heirs male of their bodies according to priority of birth.

His son, the fourteenth Earl, was a noted politician. He was created Marquess of Clanricarde in the Peerage of Ireland in 1825. In 1826 he was also made Baron Somerhill, of Somerhill in the County of Kent, in the Peerage of the United Kingdom. This title gave the Marquesses an automatic seat in the British House of Lords. Lord Clanricarde married The Hon. Harriet Canning, daughter of Prime Minister George Canning and his wife Joan. His eldest son, Lord Dunkellin, died in 1867. The 1st Marquess was succeeded by his second son, the 2nd Marquess, who assumed by Royal Licence the additional surname of Canning in 1862 as heir of his maternal uncle, Charles, 1st Earl Canning. Lord Clanricarde later represented County Galway in Parliament as a Liberal. On his death, in 1916, all the titles became extinct, except the second (1800) creation of the Earldom of Clanricarde, which passed according to the special remainder to his cousin, The 6th Marquess of Sligo. He was the grandson of the aforementioned Lady Hester Catherine de Burgh and Howe Browne, 2nd Marquess of Sligo.

The title of Viscount Bourke of Clanmories in the County of Mayo, was created in the Peerage of Ireland in 1629 for The Hon. John Bourke, fourth son of Ulick Burke, 3rd Earl of Clanricarde. The peerage, derived from the barony of Clanmorris in County Mayo, was created with remainder to the heirs male of his father. Lord Bourke was succeeded by his son, the second Viscount. On his death, around 1650, he was succeeded according to the special remainder by his cousin the fifth Earl of Clanricarde. The titles remained united until their extinction in 1916.

Other members of the family included John "na Seamar" Burke, younger son of the second Earl, who claimed the Barony of Leitrim and his sons Redmond Burke, Lord Leitrim and William Burke, Lord of Bealatury. Another was Ulick Burke, younger son of the seventh Earl, who was created Viscount Galway in 1687.

== Earls of Clanricarde; First creation (1543) ==
Other titles: Baron of Dunkellin (Ireland, 1543)

- Ulick nagCeann Burke (de Burgh), 1st Earl of Clanricarde (died 1544)
- Richard Burke, 2nd Earl of Clanricarde (died 1582)
- Ulick Burke, 3rd Earl of Clanricarde (died 1601)
- Richard Burke, 4th Earl of Clanricarde (died 1635) (created Earl of St Albans in 1628)

Other titles (4th Earl onwards): Earl of St Albans (England, 1628); Viscount Tunbridge (England, 1624); Viscount Galway (Ireland, 1628); Baron of Somerhill (England, 1624); and Baron of Imanney (Ireland, 1628)

- Ulick Burke, 5th Earl of Clanricarde, 2nd Earl of St Albans (died 1657) (created Marquess of Clanricarde in 1646)

== Marquess of Clanricarde; First creation (1646) ==
Other titles: Earl of Clanricarde (Ireland, 1543); Earl of St Albans (England, 1628); Viscount Tunbridge (England, 1624); Viscount Galway (Ireland, 1628); Viscount Bourke of Clanmories (Ireland, 1629); Baron of Dunkellin (Ireland, 1543); Baron of Somerhill (England, 1624); Baron of Imanney (Ireland, 1628)

- Ulick Burke, 1st Marquess of Clanricarde (died and extinct in 1657)

== Earls of Clanricarde; First creation (1543; Reverted) ==
Other titles: Viscount Bourke of Clanmories (Ireland, 1629); Baron of Dunkellin (Ireland, 1543)

- Richard Burke, 6th Earl of Clanricarde (died 1666)
- William Burke, 7th Earl of Clanricarde (died 1687)
- Richard Burke, 8th Earl of Clanricarde (died 1704)
- John Burke, 9th Earl of Clanricarde (1642–1722) (created Baron Bourke of Bophin in 1689)

Other titles (9th Earl onwards): Baron Bourke of Bophin (Ireland, 1689)

- Michael Burke, 10th Earl of Clanricarde (died 1726)
- John Smith (Burke) de Burgh, 11th Earl of Clanricarde (1720–1782)
- Henry de Burgh, 12th Earl of Clanricarde (1743–1797) (created Marquess of Clanricarde in 1789)

== Marquess of Clanricarde; Second creation (1789) ==
Other titles: Earl of Clanricarde (Ireland, 1543); Viscount Bourke of Clanmories (Ireland, 1629); Baron of Dunkellin (Ireland, 1543); and Baron Bourke of Bophin (Ireland, 1689)

- Henry de Burgh, 1st Marquess of Clanricarde (1743–1797)

== Earls of Clanricarde; First creation (1543; Reverted) ==
Other titles: Viscount Bourke of Clanmories (Ireland, 1629); Baron of Dunkellin (Ireland, 1543); and Baron Bourke of Bophin (Ireland, 1689)

- John de Burgh, 13th and 1st Earl of Clanricarde (1744–1808) (created Earl of Clanricarde in 1800)

Other titles (13th Earl onwards): Earl of Clanricarde (Ireland, 1800)

- Ulick de Burgh, 14th and 2nd Earl of Clanricarde (1802–1874) (created Marquess of Clanricarde in 1825)

== Marquess of Clanricarde; Third creation (1825) ==
Other titles: Earl of Clanricarde (Ireland, 1543); Earl of Clanricarde (Ireland, 1800); Viscount Bourke of Clanmories (Ireland, 1629); Baron of Dunkellin (Ireland, 1543); Baron Bourke of Bophin (Ireland, 1689); and Baron Somerhill, of Somerhill in the County of Kent (UK, 1826)

- Ulick de Burgh, 1st Marquess of Clanricarde, 14th and 2nd Earl of Clanricarde (1802–1874)
  - Ulick Canning de Burgh, Lord Dunkellin (1827–1867)
- Hubert de Burgh-Canning, 2nd Marquess of Clanricarde, 15th and 3rd Earl of Clanricarde (1832–1916)

== Earls of Clanricarde; Second creation (1800; Reverted) ==
Other titles: see Marquess of Sligo

- George Ulick Browne, 6th Marquess of Sligo, 4th Earl of Clanricarde (1856–1935)
- Ulick de Burgh Browne, 7th Marquess of Sligo, 5th Earl of Clanricarde (1898–1941)
- Arthur Howe Browne, 8th Marquess of Sligo, 6th Earl of Clanricarde (1867–1951)
- Terence Morris Browne, 9th Marquess of Sligo, 7th Earl of Clanricarde (1873–1952)
- Denis Edward Browne, 10th Marquess of Sligo, 8th Earl of Clanricarde (1908–1991)
- Jeremy Ulick Browne, 11th Marquess of Sligo, 9th Earl of Clanricarde (1939–2014)
- Sebastian Ulick Browne, 12th Marquess of Sligo, 10th Earl of Clanricarde (b. 1964)

The heir apparent is the present holder's son Christopher Ulick Browne, Earl of Altamont and Clanricarde (b. 1988)

== Viscounts Bourke of Clanmories (1629) ==
- John Bourke, 1st Viscount Bourke of Clanmories (d. 1635)
- Thomas Bourke, 2nd Viscount Bourke of Clanmories (d. c.1650)
- Ulick Burke, 1st Marquess of Clanricarde, 5th Earl of Clanricarde, 3rd Viscount Bourke of Clanmories (d. 1657)
- Richard Burke, 6th Earl of Clanricarde, 4th Viscount Bourke of Clanmories (d. 1666)

see above for further Viscounts Bourke of Clanmories

== Family tree ==
Clanricarde and Sligo family tree

Clanricarde or Mac William Uachtar
Ulick Burke of Annaghkeen d. 1343 or 1353; 1st Clanricarde
Richard Óg Burke d. 1387; 2nd Clanricarde
Ulick an Fhiona Burke d. 1424; 3rd Clanricarde	William mac Ulick Burke d. 1430; 4th Clanricarde
Ulick Ruadh Burke d. 1485; 5th Clanricarde
Edmund Burke d. 1466	Ulick Fionn Burke d. 1509; 6th Clanricarde	Richard Óge Burke d. 1519; 7th Clanricarde
Ricard of Roscam d. 1517	Ulick Óge Burke d. 1520; 8th Clanricarde	Richard Mór Burke d. 1530; 9th Clanricarde	Richard Bacach Burke d. 1538; 11th Clanricarde	Uilleag Burke d. 1551; 13th Clanricarde
Earl of Clanricarde (1st creation) and Baron of Dunkellin, 1543
John mac Richard Mór Burke d. 1536; 10th Clanricarde	Ulick na gCeann Burke d. 1544; 1st Earl of Clanricarde, etc., 12th Clanricarde
Richard Burke d. 1582; 2nd Earl of Clanricarde, etc.
Ulick Burke d. 1601; 3rd Earl of Clanricarde, etc.
Viscount Tunbridge and Baron of Somerhill, 1624; Earl of St Albans (1st creation), Viscount Galway and Baron of Imanney, 1628	Viscount Bourke of Clanmories, 1629
Richard Burke; 1572–1635; 4th Earl of Clanricarde, etc., 1st Earl of St Albans, etc.	William Burke d. 1625	John Burke b. before 1601–1633; 1st Viscount Bourke of Clanmories
Marquess of Clanricarde (1st creation), 1646
John Browne d. 1712	Ulick Burke d. 1657; Marquess of Clanricarde, 5th Earl of Clanricarde, etc., 2nd Earl of St Albans, etc., 3rd Viscount Bourke of Clanmories	Richard Burke d. 1666; 6th Earl of Clanricarde, etc., 4th Viscount Bourke of Clanmories	William Burke d. 1687; 7th Earl of Clanricarde, etc., 5th Viscount Bourke of Clanmories	Thomas Burke d. c. 1650; 2nd Viscount Bourke of Clanmories
Marquessate of Clanricarde (1st creation), Earldom of St Albans (1st creation), Viscountcy Tunbridge, Barony of Somerhill extinct, 1657
Baron Bourke of Boffin, 1689	Viscount Galway (2nd creation) and Baron Tyaquin, 1687
Peter Browne; 1670–1724	Richard Burke d. 1709; 8th Earl of Clanricarde, etc., 6th Viscount Bourke of Clanmories	John Burke; 1642–1722; 9th Earl of Clanricarde, etc., 7th Viscount Bourke of Clanmories, 1st Baron Bourke of Boffin	Ulick Burke c. 1670–1691; Viscount Galway, etc.
Viscountcy Galway and Barony Tyaquin extinct, 1657
Baron Mount Eagle, 1760; Viscount Westport, 1768; Earl of Altamont, 1771
John Browne c. 1709–1776; 1st Earl of Altamont, etc.	Michael Burke; 1686–1726; 10th Earl of Clanricarde, etc., 8th Viscount Bourke of Clanmories, 2nd Baron Bourke of Boffin
Peter Browne c. 1731–1780; 2nd Earl of Altamont, etc.	John Smith de Burgh; 1720–1782; 11th Earl of Clanricarde, etc., 9th Viscount Bourke of Clanmories, 3rd Baron Bourke of Boffin
Marquess of Sligo, 1800; Baron Monteagle, 1806	Marquess of Clanricarde (2nd creation), 1789	Earl of Clanricarde (2nd creation), 1800
John Browne; 1756–1809; 1st Marquess of Sligo, etc., 3rd Earl of Altamont, etc.	Henry de Burgh; 1742–1797; Marquess of Clanricarde, 12th Earl of Clanricarde, etc., 10th Viscount Bourke of Clanmories, 4th Baron Bourke of Boffin	John Thomas de Burgh; 1744–1808; 13th Earl of Clanricarde (1st creation), etc. 1st Earl of Clanricarde (2nd creation), 11th Viscount Bourke of Clanmories, 5th Baron Bourke of Boffin
Marquessate of Clanricarde (2nd creation) extinct, 1797
Marquess of Clanricarde (3rd creation), 1825; Baron Somerhill, 1826
Howe Browne; 1788–1845; 2nd Marquess of Sligo, etc., 4th Earl of Altamont, etc.	Hester Catherine de Burgh	Ulick John de Burgh; 1802–1874; 1st Marquess of Clanricarde, etc., 14th Earl of Clanricarde (1st creation), etc. 2nd Earl of Clanricarde (2nd creation), 12th Viscount Bourke of Clanmories, 6th Baron Bourke of Boffin
George John Browne; 1820–1896; 3rd Marquess of Sligo, etc., 5th Earl of Altamont, etc.	John Thomas Browne; 1824–1903; 4th Marquess of Sligo, etc., 6th Earl of Altamont, etc.	Henry Ulick Browne; 1831–1913; 5th Marquess of Sligo, etc., 7th Earl of Altamont, etc.	Hubert George de Burgh-Canning, 2nd Marquess of Clanricarde; 1832–1916; 2nd Marquess of Clanricarde, etc., 15th Earl of Clanricarde (1st creation), etc. 3rd Earl of Clanricarde (2nd creation), 13th Viscount Bourke of Clanmories, 7th Baron Bourke of Boffin
Marquessate of Clanricarde (3rd creation) and Earldom of Clanricarde (1st creation) extinct, 1916
George Ulick Browne; 1856–1835; 6th Marquess of Sligo, etc., 8th Earl of Altamont, etc., 4th Earl of Clanricarde	Arthur Howe Browne; 1867–1851; 8th Marquess of Sligo, etc., 10th Earl of Altamont, etc., 6th Earl of Clanricarde	Terence Morris Browne; 1873–1852; 9th Marquess of Sligo, etc., 11th Earl of Altamont, etc., 7th Earl of Clanricarde	Alfred Eden Browne
Ulick de Burgh Browne; 1898–1941; 7th Marquess of Sligo, etc., 9th Earl of Altamont, etc., 5th Earl of Clanricarde	Denis Edward Browne; 1908–1991; 10th Marquess of Sligo, etc., 12th Earl of Altamont, etc., 8th Earl of Clanricarde	Ulick Browne; 1915–1979
Jeremy Ulick Browne; 1939–2014; 11th Marquess of Sligo, etc., 13th Earl of Altamont, etc., 9th Earl of Clanricarde	Sebastian Ulick Browne b. 1964; 12th Marquess of Sligo, etc., 14th Earl of Altamont, etc., 10th Earl of Clanricarde
Christopher Ulick Browne b. 1988 styled Earl of Altamont and Clanricarde
Heir apparent to the Marquessate of Sligo

== See also ==
- House of Burgh, an Anglo-Norman and Hiberno-Norman dynasty founded in 1193
- Clanricarde (Mac William Uachtar/Upper Mac William) or Galway (Upper Connaught) Burkes
- Marquess of Sligo
- Viscount Galway, viscountcy created in the Peerage of Ireland in 1628 and 1687
- Baron Leitrim, barony created in the Peerage of Ireland
