= Portumna Castle =

Semi-fortified house in Portumna, County Galway, Ireland

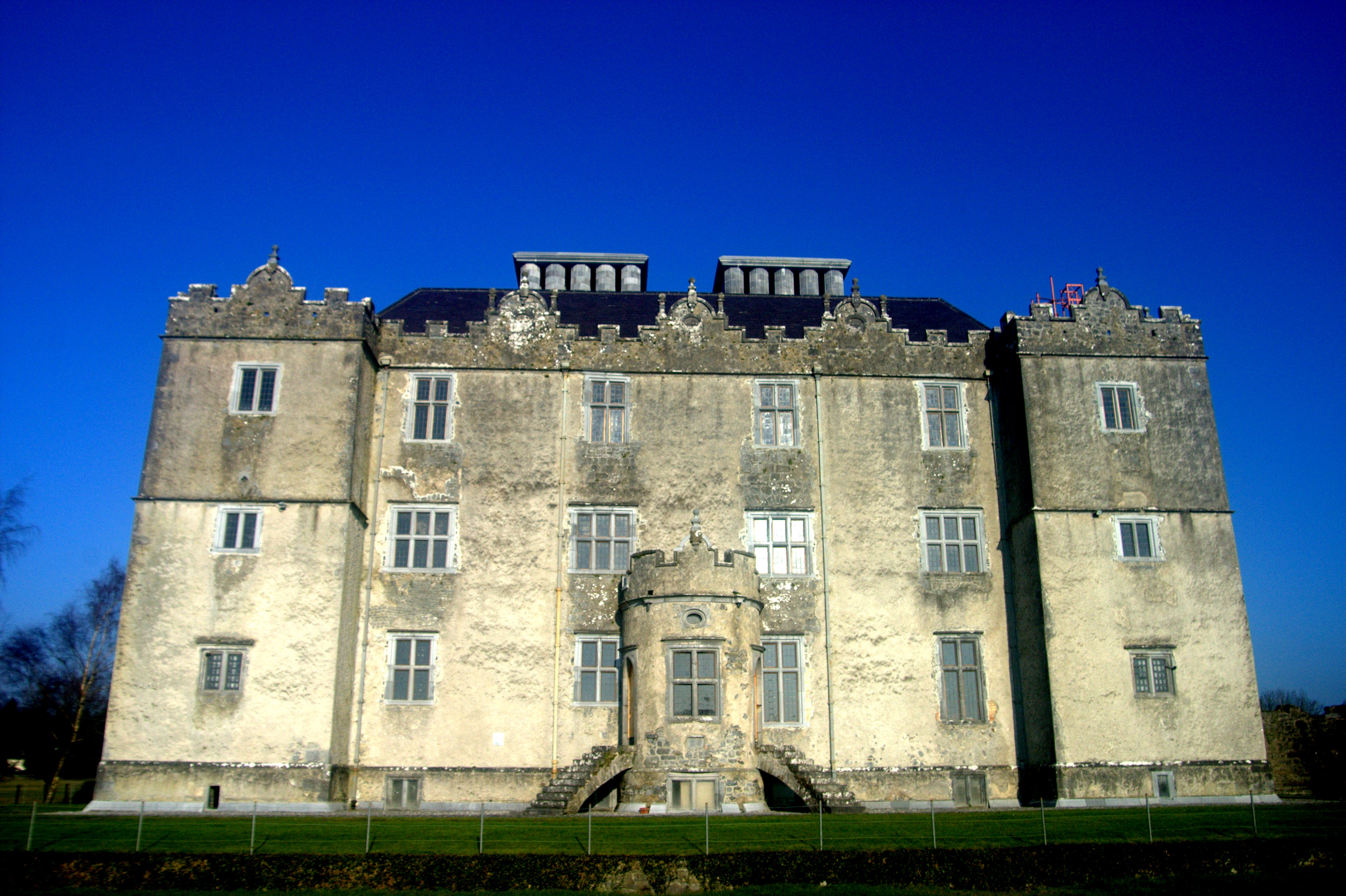
- Portumna castle

- Location within Ireland

General information
- Architectural style: Renaissance
- Location: Portumna, County Galway, Ireland
- Coordinates: 53°05′21″N 8°13′08″W
- Construction started: 1610
- Completed: 1617
- Cost: £10,000 (£2.8 million in 2020, adjusted for inflation)
- Client: Richard Burke

National monument of Ireland
- Official name: Portumna Castle
- Reference no.: 515

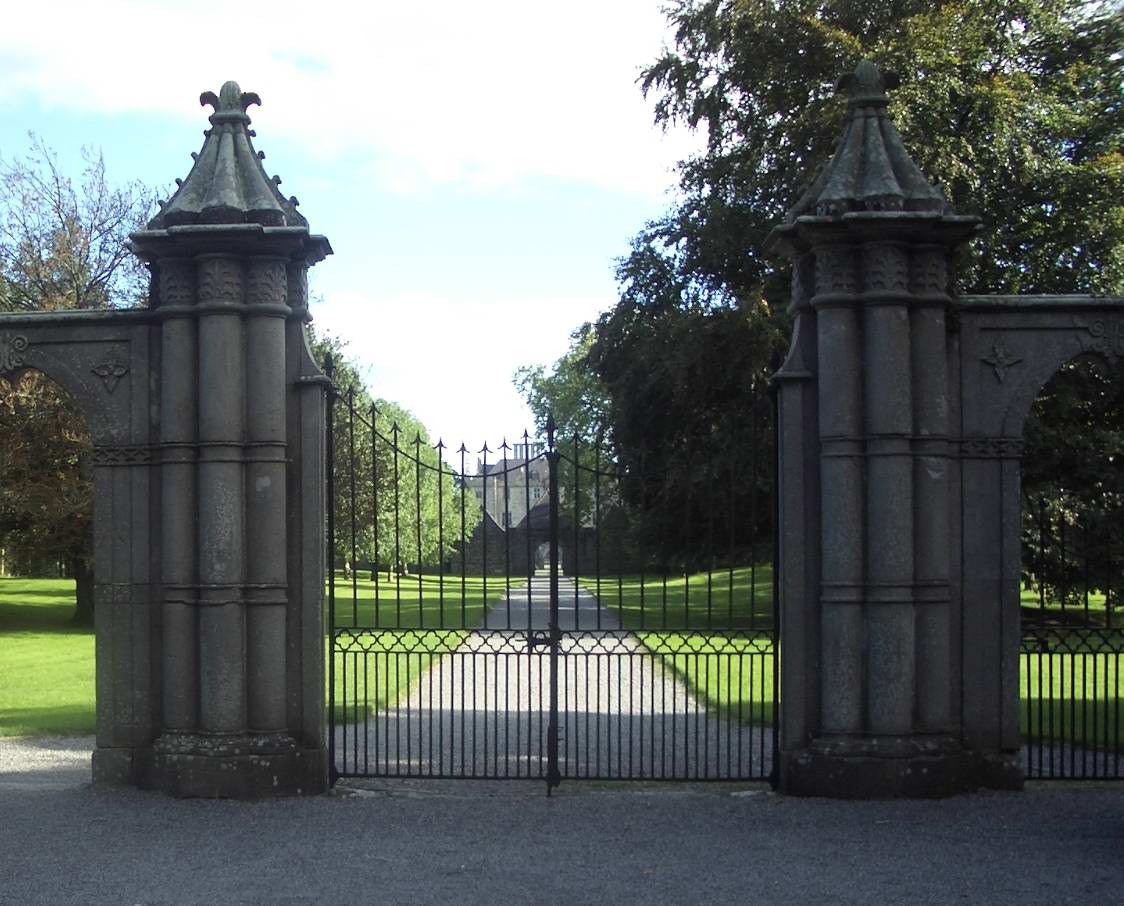
Portumna castle gates.

Portumna Castle is a semi-fortified house in Portumna, County Galway, Ireland which was built in the early 17th century by Richard Burke, 4th Earl of Clanricarde.

== Location ==
Portumna Castle is located close to the shore of Lough Derg near where the River Shannon enters the lake. Portumna Abbey is to the east.

== History ==
When it was built, Portumna Castle was without equal in Ireland at the time in style, grandeur and distinction, outshining castles at Rathfarnham, Kanturk, Carrickfergus, Charlemont and Burncourt. Its builder was Richard Burke, 4th Earl of Clanricarde, Lord President of Connaught, of the de Burgo family of Norman descent. The castle was built around 1610 to 1617 at a cost of £10,000. The Earl also built a mansion, Somerhill House, Royal Tunbridge Wells in Kent.

Portumna castle was built in the Renaissance style already prevalent in Italy and France for over a century, but not commonly found in Ireland or England at that time. The Renaissance features of the exterior are, strictly speaking, limited to the doorcase of the front entrance and the Tuscan gateway of the innermost courtyard, but the layout is an expression of Renaissance ideas. The castle is symmetrical in shape and consists of three stories over a basement with square corner projecting towers. The castle measures 29.7m by 21.2m and the corner towers are 6.5m square with gunports. A central corridor, 3m wide, runs longitudinally from top to bottom, supported by stone walls, which contain numerous recesses and fireplaces.

The castle was abandoned as a home following a fire in 1826. The Office of Public Works has re-built the huge chimney stacks. The estate grounds contain walled gardens, gate lodges, gateposts and a yard.

== See also ==
- Flight of the Wild Geese
- House of Burgh
