= Ulick de Burgh, 1st Marquess of Clanricarde =

British politician and diplomat (1802–74)

The Most Honourable The Marquess of Clanricarde KP PC
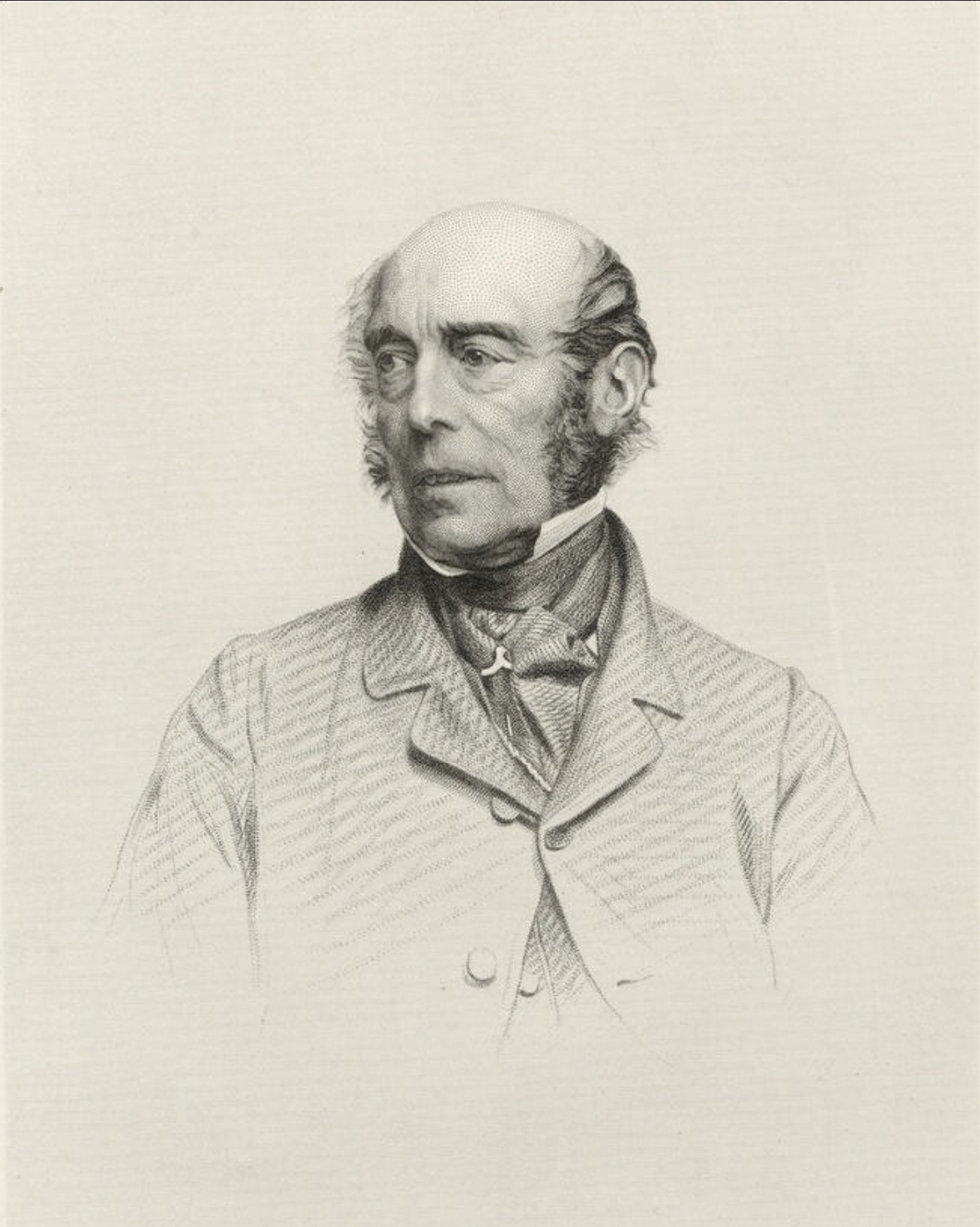
- Portrait by Joseph Brown, 1866

Lord Privy Seal
- In office 3 February 1858 – 21 February 1858
- Monarch: Victoria
- Prime Minister: The Viscount Palmerston
- Preceded by: The Earl of Harrowby
- Succeeded by: The Earl of Hardwicke

Postmaster General
- In office 7 July 1846 – 21 February 1852
- Prime Minister: Lord John Russell
- Preceded by: The Earl of St Germans
- Succeeded by: The Earl of Hardwicke

British Ambassador to Russia
- In office 1838–1840
- Prime Minister: The Viscount Melbourne
- Preceded by: The Earl of Durham
- Succeeded by: The Lord Stuart de Rothesay

Captain of the Yeomen of the Guard
- In office 1 December 1830 – 16 July 1834
- Monarch: William IV
- Prime Minister: The Earl Grey
- Preceded by: The Earl of Macclesfield
- Succeeded by: The Earl of Gosford

Under-Secretary of State for Foreign Affairs
- In office 2 January 1826 – 17 August 1826 Serving with The Lord Howard de Walden
- Monarch: George IV
- Prime Minister: The Earl of Liverpool
- Preceded by: The Lord Howard de Walden; Lord Francis Conyngham
- Succeeded by: The Lord Howard de Walden
Honorary Appointments
Lord Lieutenant of Galway
In office 1831–1874
Preceded by	Office created
Succeeded by	The Lord Clonbrock
Vice-Admiral of Connaught
In office 1841–1847
Parliamentary Offices
Member of the House of Lords
Lord Temporal
Hereditary Peerage (Baron Somerhill); 13 December 1826 – 10 April 1874
Preceded by	New Creation
Succeeded by	Hubert de Burgh-Canning

Personal details
- Born: Ulick John de Burgh; 20 December 1802 Belmont, Hampshire
- Died: 10 April 1874 (aged 71) Stratton Street, Piccadilly, London
- Party: Tory; Whig
- Spouse: Hon. Harriet Canning (m. 1825)
- Children: 7
- Parents: The 13th Earl of Clanricarde; Elizabeth Burke
- Education: Eton College
- Alma mater: Christ Church, Oxford
- Military career
- Allegiance: United Kingdom
- Branch: British Militia
- Service years: 1831–1874
- Rank: Colonel
- Commands: Galway Militia

Ulick John de Burgh, 1st Marquess of Clanricarde KP PC (English: /ˈjuːlɪk dəˈbɜːr ... klænˈrɪkɑːrd/ YOO-lik də-BUR ... klan-RIK-ard; 20 December 1802 – 10 April 1874), styled Lord Dunkellin (/dʌnˈkɛlɪn/ dun-KEL-in) until 1808 and the Earl of Clanricarde from 1808 until 1825, was a British Whig politician who served as British Ambassador to Russia (1838–40), Postmaster General (1846–52) and Lord Privy Seal (1858).

== Background and education ==
Born at Belmont, Hampshire, Clanricarde was the son of General The 13th Earl of Clanricarde and Elizabeth, daughter of Sir Thomas Burke, 1st Baronet. Henry, 1st Marquess of Clanricarde, was his uncle. He succeeded in the earldom in July 1808 at the age of five, on the death of his father. He was educated at Eton College. The young 14th Earl of Clanricarde was a member of the Anglican Church, like his father, although his mother was a Catholic.

Lord Clanricarde was an active Freemason as a young man. While studying as an undergraduate at Christ Church, Oxford, he was initiated into the Apollo University Lodge No. 711 (later No. 357) of the United Grand Lodge of England on 15 November 1820.

== Political and diplomatic career ==
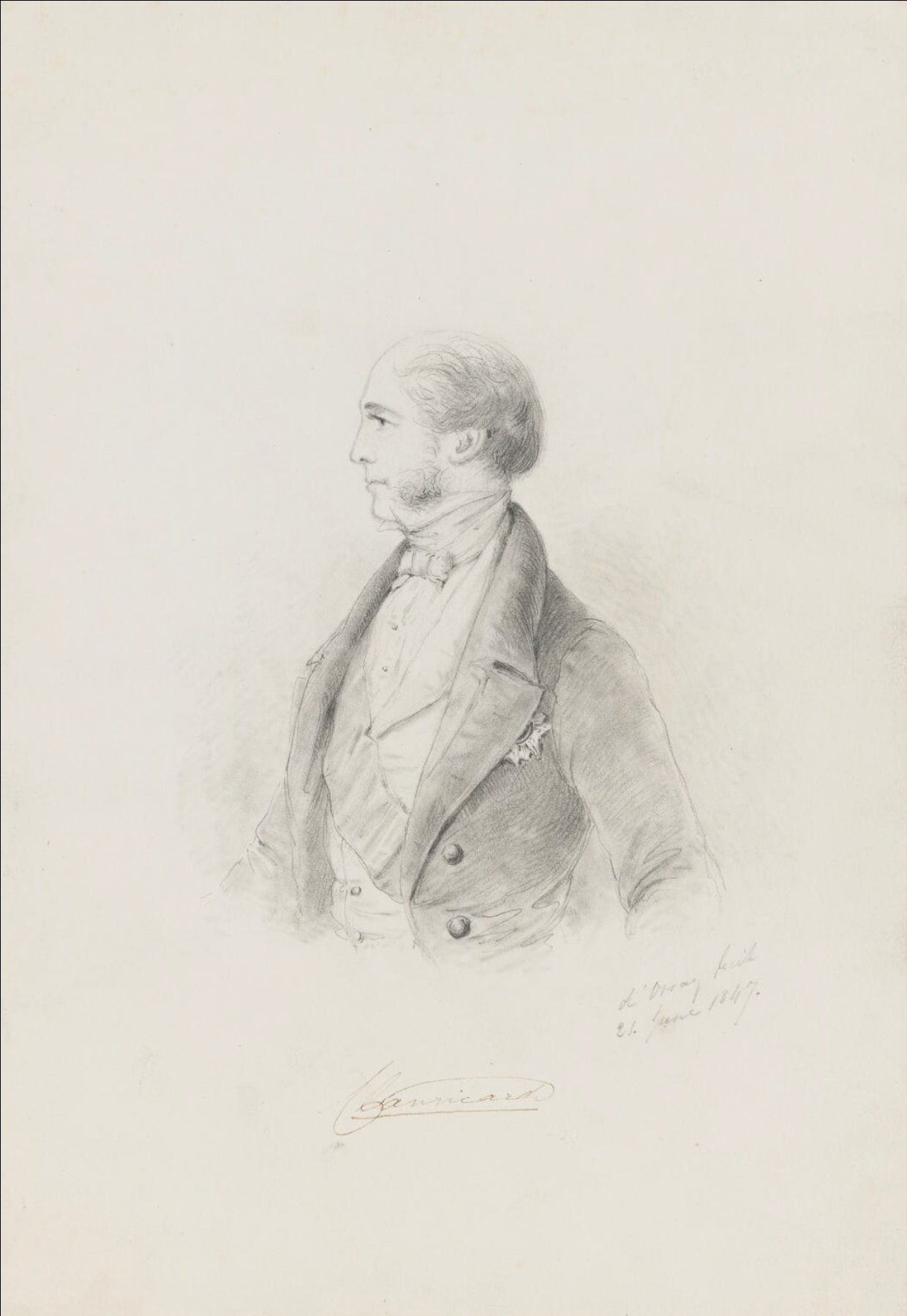
1847 portrait of Clanricarde by Alfred d'Orsay

In 1825, at the age of 24, Clanricarde was created Marquess of Clanricarde in the Peerage of Ireland, a revival of the title which had become extinct on his uncle's death in 1797. The following year he was made Baron Somerhill, of Somerhill in the County of Kent, in the Peerage of the United Kingdom, which entitled him to a seat in the House of Lords. In January 1826 the Earl of Liverpool appointed him as Joint Under-Secretary of State for Foreign Affairs (alongside Lord Howard de Walden), a post he held until August of the same year. He was sworn of the Privy Council in December 1830.

Between 1838 and 1840, Lord Clanricarde served as British Ambassador to Russia. In 1846, he was appointed Postmaster General, with a seat in the cabinet, by Lord John Russell, an office he retained until the government fell in 1852. He held his last ministerial post when he was briefly Lord Privy Seal under Lord Palmerston for a few weeks in February 1858. Apart from his political career, he was also Lord-Lieutenant of County Galway between 1831 and 1874, Colonel of the Galway Militia from 1831 and Vice-Admiral of Connaught from 1841 until 1847. In 1831, he was made a Knight of the Order of St Patrick. He served as president of the Royal Institute of the Architects of Ireland from 1844 to 1863.

== Great Hunger ==
Clanricarde was a substantial landowner in County Galway, with his Norman-descended family having their seat at Portumna Castle. During the years of the Great Famine, his record was mixed. A supporter of the Whigs and a sitting member of the first Russell ministry, his principal aim was upholding the interests of the Protestant Ascendancy.

Although he did not initiate mass clearances of destitute tenants from the estates, as Lord Palmerston and Lord Lansdowne were notoriously known for, there were more small-scale displacements over a longer period of time. Clanricarde was the Crown's Lord Lieutenant of Galway during the Famine and did not condemn the large-scale evictions by his fellow Galway landowners, John Gerrard (and his wife Marcella Netterville) at Ballinlass, Christopher St George at Connemara and Patrick Blake at Tully.

On the other hand, Clanricarde highlighted, in his correspondence with Russell and the Whig administration in Ireland, the plight of starving tenants. He advocated a paternalistic state intervention, rather than a purely laissez-faire approach. He suggested state-sponsored public works and land drainage and sought to have corn depots set up in Loughrea and Portumna to distribute food. He donated some monies to local relief committees. Clanricarde also financially assisted the emigration of poor tenants; this issue is controversial due to the fact that it still meant the displacement of the native population from the land, but supporters argue that it would have at least saved more lives (Charles Trevelyan opposed such programmes). Lord Clanricarde did not initiate any private work schemes on the estates under his control for tenants, like some neighbouring landlords, nor did he improve agriculture on the estates.

== Family ==
Lord Clanricarde married Harriet Canning (13 April 1804 – 8 January 1876), daughter of Prime Minister George Canning and his wife Joan Canning, 1st Viscountess Canning, on 4 April 1825 at Gloucester Lodge in Brompton. The couple had seven children:

- Lady Elizabeth Joanna de Burgh (22 February 1826 – 26 February 1854); married the 4th Earl of Harewood
- Ulick Canning de Burgh, Lord Dunkellin (12 July 1827 – 16 August 1867)
- Lady Emily Charlotte de Burgh (19 October 1828 – 10 October 1912); married the 9th Earl of Cork
- Lady Catherine de Burgh (c. 1830 – 8 April 1895); married John Weyland, and together they had a son.
- Lady Margaret Anne de Burgh (c. 1831 – 31 March 1888); married the 1st Baron Allendale
- Hubert George de Burgh-Canning, 2nd Marquess of Clanricarde (30 November 1832 – 12 April 1916)
- Lady Harriet Augusta de Burgh (c. 1834 – 18 January 1901); married Thomas Frederick Charles Vernon-Wentworth, maternal grandson of the 1st Marquess of Ailesbury. They had a son and a daughter.

Lord Clanricarde died at Stratton Street, Piccadilly, London, in April 1874, aged 71, and was succeeded in the marquessate by his second but only surviving son, Hubert. The Marchioness of Clanricarde died in January 1876, aged 71.

== Honours and Arms ==
=== Honours ===
Country	Date	Appointment	Ribbon	Post-nominals
United Kingdom	1830–1874	Privy Council (United Kingdom)		PC
United Kingdom	1831–1874	Knight of the Most Illustrious Order of St Patrick		KP

=== Arms ===
Coat of arms of Ulick de Burgh, 1st Marquess of Clanricarde
Crest A Cat-a-Mountain sejant guardant proper, collared and chained Or. Escutcheon Or, a cross gules in the first quarter a lion rampant sable. Supporters Two Cats-a-Mountain sejant guardant proper, collared and chained Or. Motto UNG ROY, UNG FOY, UNG LOY (One king, one faith, one law) Orders Order of St Patrick

== Ancestry ==
Ancestors of Ulick de Burgh, 1st Marquess of Clanricarde

8. Michael Burke, 10th Earl of Clanricarde
4. John Smith de Burgh, 11th Earl of Clanricarde
9. Anne Smith
2. John de Burgh, 13th Earl of Clanricarde
10. Sir Henry Vincent, 6th Baronet
5. Hester Amelia Vincent
11. Elizabeth Sherman
1. Ulick de Burgh, 1st Marquess of Clanricarde
12.
6. Sir Thomas Burke, 1st Bt
13.
3. Elizabeth Burke
14.
7.
15.

== See also ==
- House of Burgh, an Anglo-Norman and Hiberno-Norman dynasty founded in 1193

Political offices
Preceded by The Lord Howard de Walden; Lord Francis Conyngham	Under-Secretary of State for Foreign Affairs; 2 January 1826 – 17 August 1826; With: The Lord Howard de Walden	Succeeded by The Lord Howard de Walden
Preceded by The Earl of Macclesfield	Captain of the Yeomen of the Guard; 1830–1834	Succeeded by The Earl of Gosford
Preceded by The Earl of St Germans	Postmaster-General; 1846–1852	Succeeded by The Earl of Hardwicke
Preceded by The Earl of Harrowby	Lord Privy Seal; 1858	Succeeded by The Earl of Hardwicke
Diplomatic posts
Preceded by The Earl of Durham	British Ambassador to Russia; 1838–1840	Succeeded by The Lord Stuart de Rothesay
Honorary titles
New office	Lord Lieutenant of Galway; 1831–1874	Succeeded by The Lord Clonbrock
Preceded by	Vice-Admiral of Connaught; 1841–1847	Succeeded by
Professional and academic associations
Preceded by Richard Wingfield, 6th Viscount Powerscourt	President of the Royal Institute of the Architects of Ireland; 1844–1863	Succeeded by Charles Lanyon
Peerage of Ireland
New creation	Marquess of Clanricarde; 1825–1874	Succeeded by Hubert George de Burgh-Canning
Preceded by John de Burgh	Earl of Clanricarde; 1808–1874	Succeeded by Hubert George de Burgh-Canning
Peerage of the United Kingdom
New creation	Baron Somerhill; 1826–1874	Succeeded by Hubert George de Burgh-Canning
