= Augusta Caroline Crofton =

19th century female Anglo-Irish amateur photographer

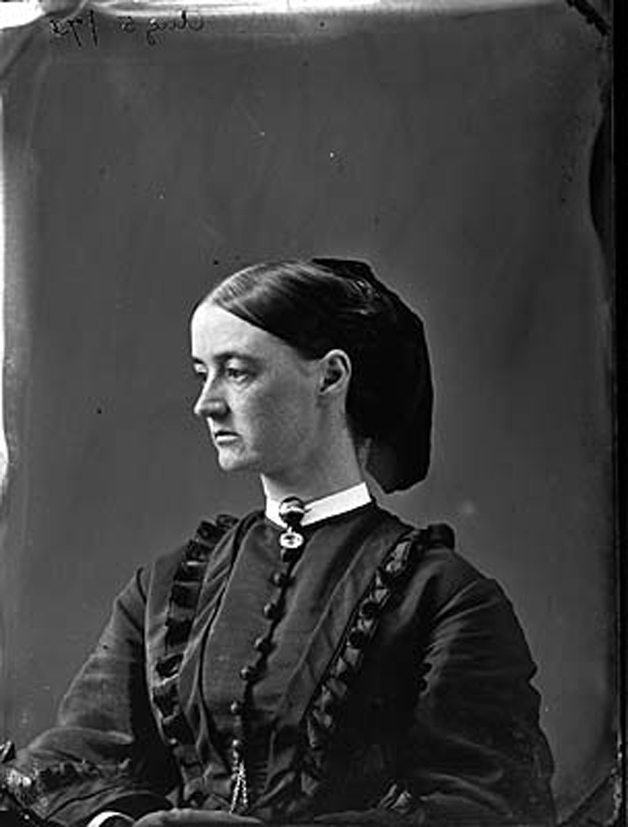
- Augusta Caroline Dillon Crofton in August 1873.
- Born: 16 October 1839; County Roscommon, Ireland
- Died: 5 September 1928 (aged 88)
- Occupation: Photographer
- Spouse: Luke Dillon, 4th Baron Clonbrock (m. 1866)
- Children: 4
- Relatives: Edward Crofton, 2nd Baron Crofton (father)

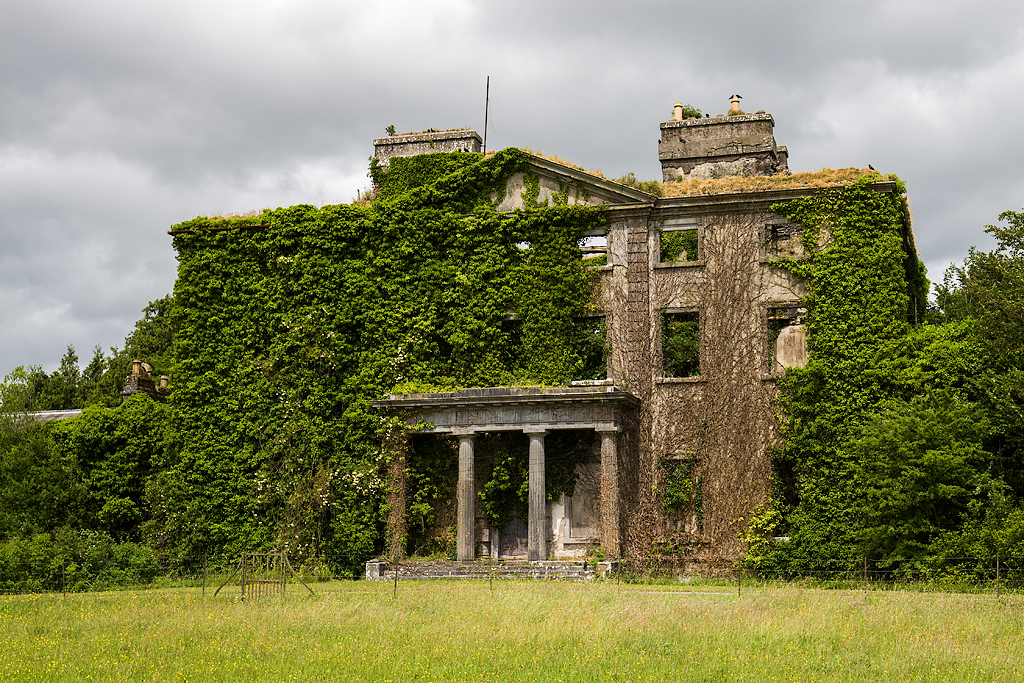
The remains of Clonbrock House in 2018.

Augusta Caroline Crofton Dillon (16 October 1839 – 5 September 1928) was a prolific Anglo-Irish amateur photographer and flaneur in 19th and early 20th century Ireland.

Over the course of her career she took over 5,000 photographs. A significant proportion of these photographs are now contained within the National Library of Ireland Clonbrock collection, a reference to her residence at Clonbrock House, Ahascragh, County Galway. The collection was primarily acquired by the library in 1977.

She was born at the Crofton ancestral home of Mote Park House in County Roscommon, the daughter of Edward Crofton, 2nd Baron Crofton. She lived most of her life at Clonbrock House and Estate in County Galway. On 18 July 1866, she married Luke Dillon, 4th Baron Clonbrock and became Baroness Clonbrock on 4 December 1893. Crofton had four children who were all actively involved in photography including Georgiana Caroline (born 1867), Robert Edward, 5th Baron Clonbrock (1869–1926), Edith Augusta (born 1878) and Ethel Louisa (born 1880).

Crofton was also involved in sponsoring and administering the collection of Sphagnum moss during World War I for use by injured soldiers as dressings.

== See also ==
- Clonbrock Castle
