= Cuan =

Cuan may refer to:

- Cuan, Seil, a village on the island of Seil, Scotland
  - Cuan Sound, Scotland
- Angel Cuan (born 1989), Panamanian baseball player
- Cuan McCarthy (1929–2000), South African cricketer
- Cuan Mhuire, Irish rehabilitation organisation
- Cúán úa Lothcháin (died 1024), Irish poet
- St Cúan (died 752), Irish abbot
- St. Cuan's Well, Ireland
- St Mo Chua of Balla (died 637), also called Cuan
