= Hubert de Burgh-Canning, 2nd Marquess of Clanricarde =

British politician and peer (1832–1916)

The Most Honourable The Marquess of Clanricarde
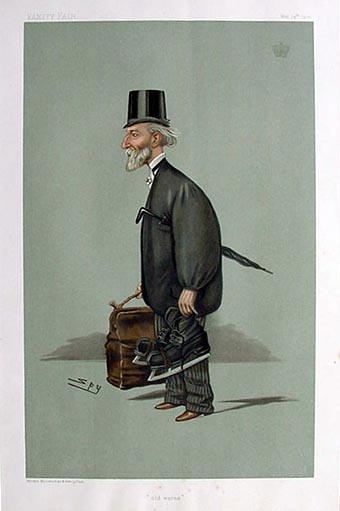
- "Old Wares": Clanricarde as caricatured by Spy (Leslie Ward) in Vanity Fair, May 1900

Member of the House of Lords
- Lord Temporal
- Hereditary Peerage (Baron Somerhill); 10 April 1874 – 12 April 1916
- Preceded by: Ulick de Burgh
- Succeeded by: Extinct

Member of Parliament for County Galway
- In office 1867–1871 Serving with William Henry Gregory
- Preceded by: Ulick Canning de Burgh, Lord Dunkellin
- Succeeded by: Mitchell Henry

Personal details
- Born: 30 November 1832
- Died: 12 April 1916 (aged 83)
- Party: Whig \ Liberal
- Parents: Ulick de Burgh, 1st Marquess of Clanricarde; Hon. Harriet Canning
- Relatives: Ulick Canning de Burgh, Lord Dunkellin (brother); Emily Charlotte de Burgh, Countess of Cork (sister)
- Education: Harrow School

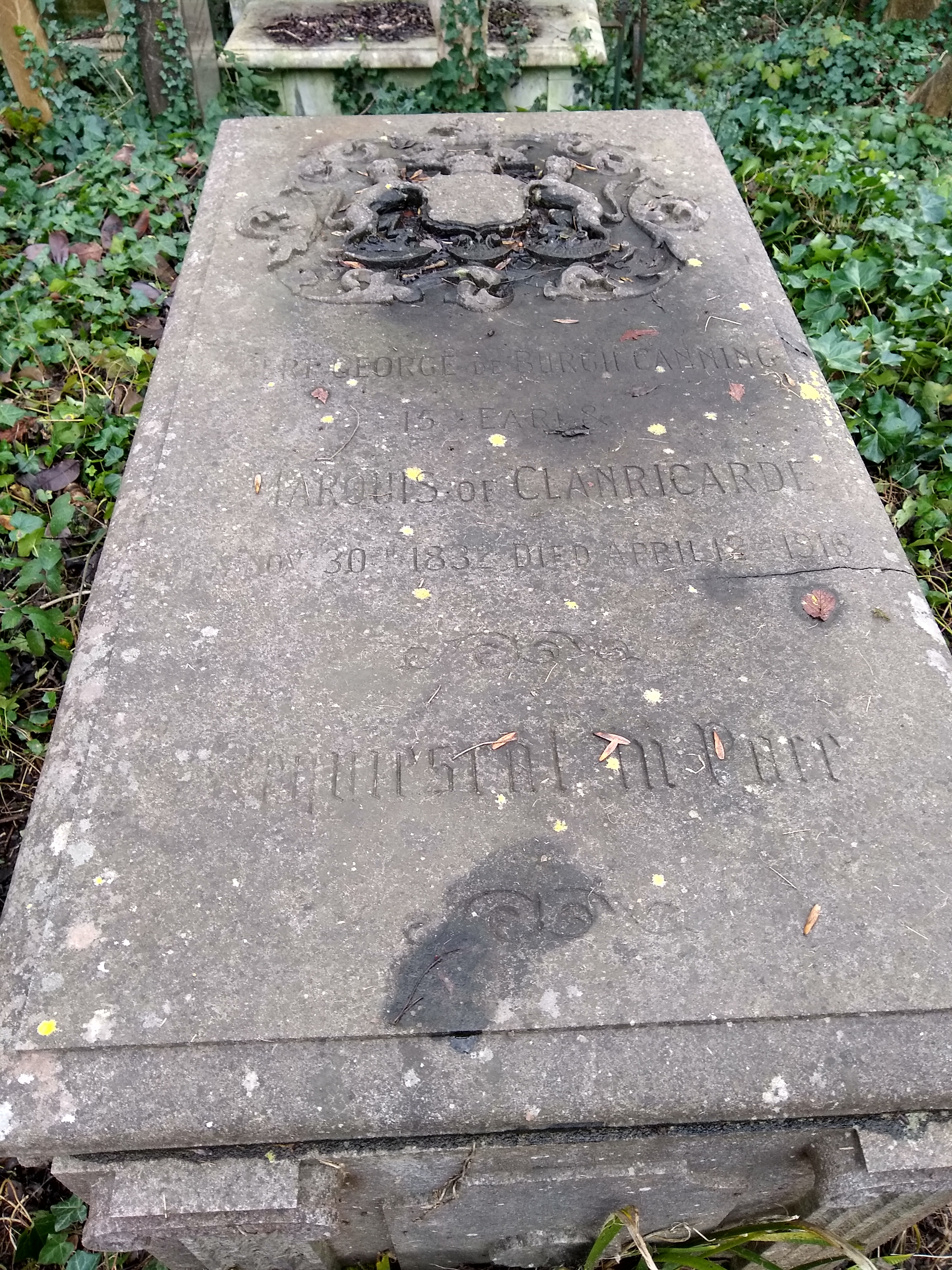
Family grave of Lord Clanricarde in Highgate Cemetery.

Hubert George de Burgh-Canning, 2nd Marquess of Clanricarde (English: /dəˈbɜːr ... klænˈrɪkɑːrd/ də-BUR ... klan-RIK-ard; 30 November 1832 – 12 April 1916), styled Lord Hubert de Burgh until 1862, Lord Hubert de Burgh-Canning until 1867, and Viscount Bourke until 1874, was an Anglo-Irish ascendancy nobleman, millionaire, and politician who was the grandson of British Prime Minister George Canning.

== Early life ==
Hubert was the son of the 1st Marquess of Clanricarde and his wife, Harriet, daughter of British Prime Minister George Canning. He was educated at Harrow School and pursued a diplomatic career: he was an attaché in Turin in 1852 and rose to become Second Secretary there in 1862. He assumed the surname Canning after inheriting the estates of his uncle, Earl Canning.

After the death of his elder brother, Lord Dunkellin, who had been Liberal MP for County Galway from 1865 until his death in 1867, Hubert succeeded in becoming heir to both the Marquessate and also to his brother's seat. He was elected as the Liberal MP for County Galway in 1867, re-elected in 1868, and retired in 1871. After his brother's death in 1867 and before succeeding his father as Marquess in 1874, Hubert was known by the courtesy title, Viscount Bourke, which was one of his father's other subsidiary titles. On his father's death, he inherited his family titles in the Peerage of Ireland and also his father's title as Baron Somerhill in the Peerage of the United Kingdom which entitled him to a seat in the House of Lords.

== Career ==
Hubert de Burgh-Canning was unmourned in Ireland, where he had a reputation as one of the worst and most repressive absentee landlords in the country. His estate centred on Portumna, County Galway, spanned a mainly agricultural 52,000 acres (210 km^{2}) (81 sq mi) (about 3.5% of this second-largest county), yielding about an average of £25,000 (equivalent to £2,600,000 in 2025) during his lifetime yearly in rents paid by 1,900 largely poorly agriculturally equipped and housed tenants, and was a main target during the 1887 Plan of Campaign fought for fair rents by the Irish Parliamentary Party.

Clanricarde's opposition to the plan was so obdurate that an Irish minister commented: "... what right has Clanricarde to be treated better than a lunatic or an orphan?" His land agent John Henry Blake was murdered in 1882. In 1888, the Earl wrote to Chief Secretary for Ireland Arthur Balfour: "the western Irish cannot be kept up to their contracts without the threat of eviction".

Eighteen years later upon the suggestion of Balfour, the Irish members of parliament submitted a bill to parliament for the expropriation of his estates. The Prime Minister, Sir Henry Campbell-Bannerman, approved the bill and denounced Clanricarde in Parliament in a way described as 'scathing'. Never had Clanricarde visited his estates, despite the many thousands of families that had been evicted from them during that time, resulting in mass destitution. "So universal is the execration in which this particular nobleman is held by people of every political party that when the question of this bill was put to the vote by the speaker, liberals, liberal unionists and conservatives all voted with the Irish party, only three of the nearly 700 members of the House of Commons opposing the vote, which would otherwise have been unanimous."

From 1891 onwards the Congested Districts Board attempted to compulsorily purchase the estate but were not successful until 1915.

== Death ==
He died in 1916, aged 83, a resident of 13 Hanover Square, London, and was buried on the west side of Highgate Cemetery, London. His probate was sworn in that year at £2,500,000 (equivalent to about £188,000,000 in 2025). At his death, his vast fortune devolved upon his sister's grandson, Henry, Viscount Lascelles, who in 1922 went on to marry Princess Mary.

Upon his death, his peerages became extinct, save for the second creation of the Earldom of Clanricarde, which passed by special remainder to the 6th Marquess of Sligo.

== Arms ==
Coat of arms of Hubert de Burgh-Canning, 2nd Marquess of Clanricarde
Crest A Cat-a-Mountain sejant guardant proper, collared and chained Or. Escutcheon Or, a cross gules in the first quarter a lion rampant sable. Supporters Two Cats-a-Mountain sejant guardant proper, collared and chained Or. Motto UNG ROY, UNG FOY, UNG LOY (One king, one faith, one law)

== Ancestry ==
Ancestors of Hubert de Burgh-Canning, 2nd Marquess of Clanricarde

8. John Smith de Burgh, 11th Earl of Clanricarde
4. John de Burgh, 13th Earl of Clanricarde
9. Hester Amelia Vincent
2. Ulick de Burgh, 1st Marquess of Clanricarde
10. Sir Thomas Burke, 1st Bt
5. Elizabeth Burke
11.
1. Hubert George de Burgh-Canning, 2nd Marquess of Clanricarde
12. George Canning
6. George Canning
13. Mary Ann Costello
3. Harriet Canning
14. Major-General John Scott
7. Joan Scott
15. Margaret Dundas

== See also ==
- House of Burgh, an Anglo-Norman and Hiberno-Norman dynasty founded in 1193

Parliament of the United Kingdom
Preceded by Ulick Canning de Burgh; William Henry Gregory	Member of Parliament for County Galway; 1867–1871; With: William Henry Gregory	Succeeded by Mitchell Henry; William Henry Gregory
Peerage of Ireland
Preceded by Ulick de Burgh	Marquess of Clanricarde; 1874–1916	Extinct
Preceded by Ulick de Burgh	Earl of Clanricarde; 1800 creation 1874–1916	Succeeded by George Browne
Peerage of the United Kingdom
Preceded by Ulick de Burgh	Baron Somerhill; 1874–1916	Extinct
