= Robert Dillon, 3rd Baron Clonbrock =

Irish peer (1807-1893)

Robert Dillon 3rd Baron Clonbrock
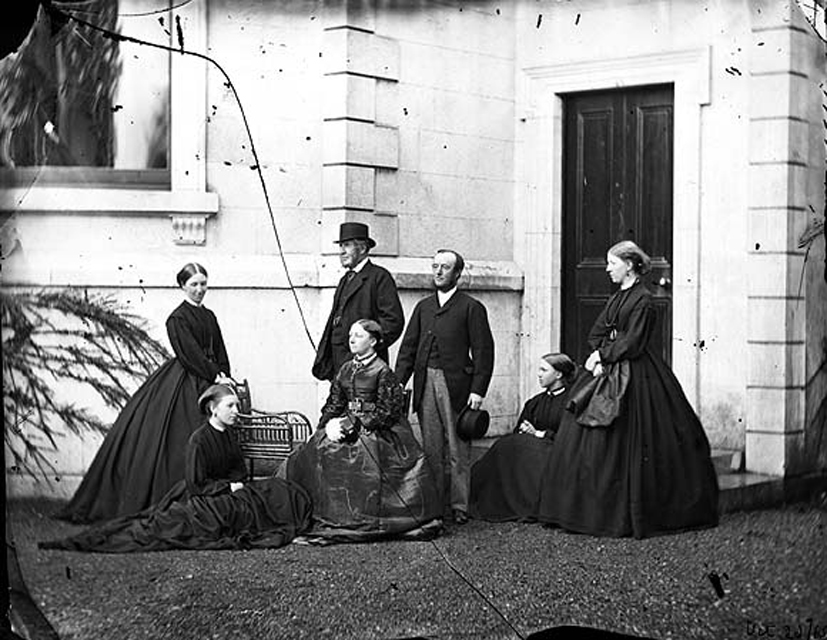
- Dillon family portrait, including Robert Dillon

Lord Lieutenant of Galway
- In office 1874–1892
- Preceded by: Ulick de Burgh, 1st Marquess of Clanricarde
- Succeeded by: Luke Dillon, 4th Baron Clonbrock

Personal details
- Born: 29 March 1807
- Died: 4 December 1893 (aged 86)
- Spouse: Hon Caroline Elizabeth Spencer (m. 1830; died 1864)
- Children: 12
- Parents: Luke Dillon, 2nd Baron Clonbrock (father); Anastasia Blake (mother)
- Relatives: Joseph Blake (maternal grandfather); Luke Dillon (son); Hugh Ellis-Nanney (son-in-law)
- Education: Eton College
- Alma mater: Christ Church, Oxford

Robert Dillon, 3rd Baron Clonbrock (29 March 1807 – 4 December 1893), was an Irish peer.

Dillon was the son of Luke Dillon, 2nd Baron Clonbrock, by the Honourable Anastasia, daughter of Joseph Blake, 1st Baron Wallscourt. He was educated at Eton and Christ Church, Oxford. In December 1826, aged 19, he succeeded his father in the barony. This was an Irish peerage and did not entitle him to an automatic seat in the House of Lords. However, in 1838 he was elected an Irish representative peer. In 1872 he was appointed Lord-Lieutenant of Galway, a post he held until 1892.

== Family ==
Lord Clonbrock married the Honourable Caroline Elizabeth, daughter of Francis Spencer, 1st Baron Churchill, in 1830. They had four sons and eight daughters :

- Hon Luke Amalric Dillon (b. 5 July 1832 - dvp Feb 1833)
- Hon Luke Dillon, 4th Baron Clonbrock (10 March 1834 – 12 May 1917)
- Col Hon Robert Villiers Dillon (b. 10 Dec 1838 - 19 April 1923), mar. 3 June 1873 Harriet Caroline Elizabeth Gladstone (d. 25 Feb 1932), dau of A S Gladstone
- Hon Francis William Dillon (b. 20 Dec 1842 - dvp 9 April 1858)
- Hon Frances Letita Dillon (d. 26 September 1911)
- Hon Caroline Anastasia Dillon (d. 15 Apr 1907), mar 30 Jan 1877 William Dealtry CMG, son of Ven...
- Hon Helen Isabella Dillon (d. 8 Nov 1916)
- Hon Louisa Emilia Dillon (d. 23 May 1927)
- Hon Georgiana Louisa Dillon (dvp. 2 May 1892)
- Hon Alice Elizabeth Dillon (dvp 18 Dec 1878) mar. 26 July 1866 married John Congreve in 1866 and settled at Mount Congreve estate.
- Hon Katherine Charlotte Dillon (d. 14 August 1927)
- Hon Elizabeth Octavia Dillon (d. 12 January 1928), mar 13 Jan 1875 Hugh Ellis-Nanney

Lady Clonbrock died at Clonbrock Castle in December 1864, aged 59. Lord Clonbrock remained a widower until his death in December 1893, aged 86. He was succeeded in the barony by his second but eldest surviving son.

== Cricket ==
Dillon was a member of Marylebone Cricket Club (MCC) and appeared in five important matches between 1832 and 1834. He was recorded on scorecards as "Lord Clonbrock", scored a cumulative 13 runs and had a highest score of 6.

Honorary titles
Preceded by The Marquess of Clanricarde	Lord-Lieutenant of Galway; 1874–1892	Succeeded by The Lord Clonbrock
Peerage of Ireland
Preceded by Luke Dillon	Baron Clonbrock; 1826–1893	Succeeded by Luke Gerald Dillon
Political offices
Preceded by The Earl of Clancarty	Representative peer for Ireland; 1838–1893	Succeeded by Viscount Templetown
