= John de Burgh, 13th Earl of Clanricarde =

British Army officer (1744–1808)

General The Right Honourable The Earl of Clanricarde PC (Ire)
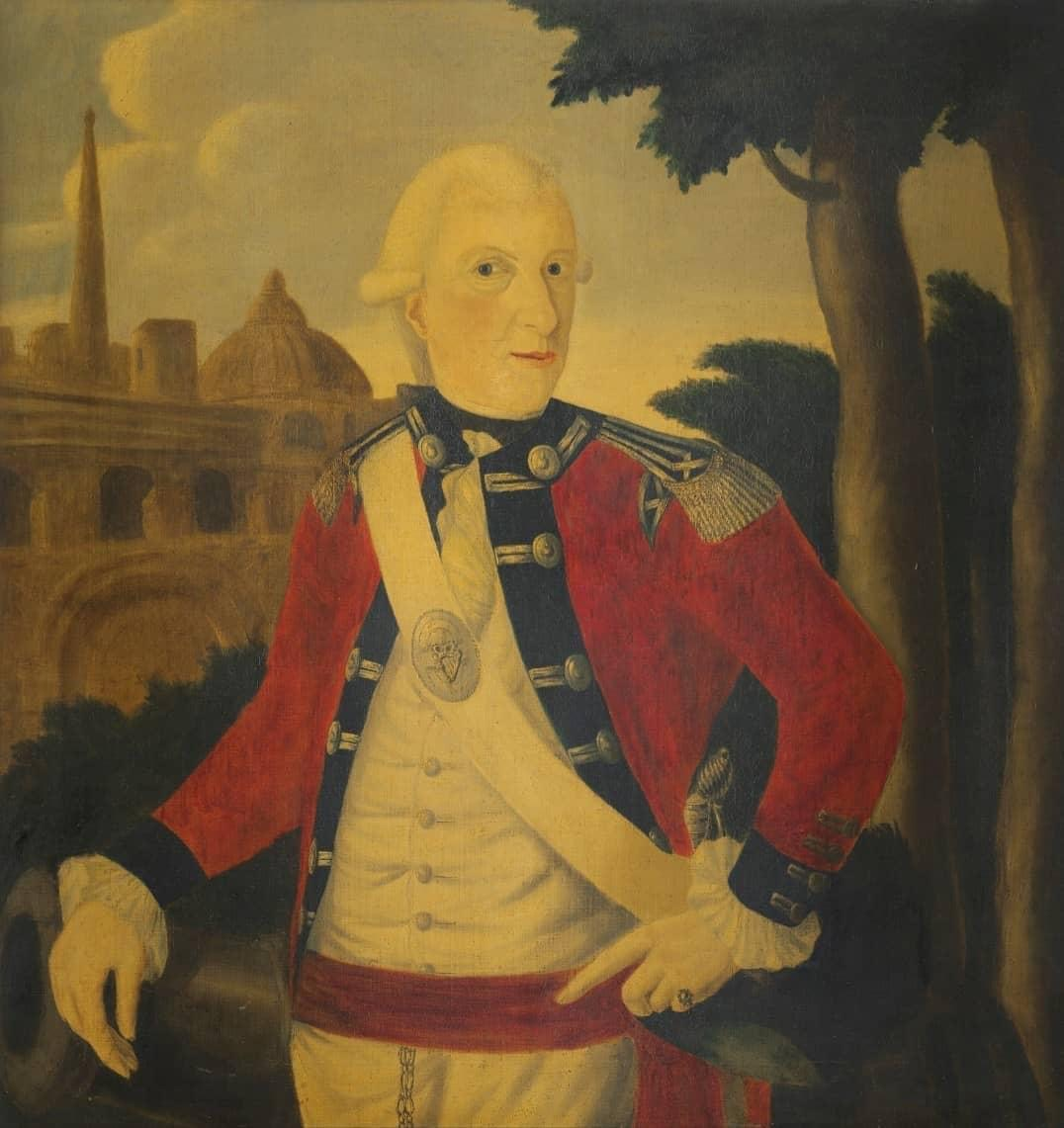
- Portrait of Clanricarde

Governor of Kingston-upon-Hull
- In office 1801–1808
- Preceded by: Hon. William Harcourt
- Succeeded by: Sir William Medows

Governor and Custos Rotulorum of County Galway
- In office 1798–1808
- Preceded by: The Marquess of Clanricarde
- Succeeded by: The Earl of Clancarty
Parliamentary offices
Member of the House of Lords
Lord Temporal
Representative Peer for Ireland; 2 August 1800 – 27 July 1808
Preceded by	New Creation
Succeeded by	The Earl of Clancarty
Member of the Irish House of Lords
Hereditary Peerage; 8 December 1797 – 1 January 1801
Preceded by	Henry de Burgh
Succeeded by	Abolition

Personal details
- Born: John Thomas de Burgh; 22 September 1744
- Died: 27 July 1808 (aged 63)
- Spouse: Elizabeth Burke
- Children: Ulick John de Burgh; Lady Hester de Burgh; Lady Emily de Burgh
- Parents: The 11th Earl of Clanricarde; Hester Amelia Vincent
- Relatives: The 1st Marquess of Clanricarde (brother)
- Military career
- Allegiance: Great Britain; United Kingdom
- Branch: British Army
- Service years: 1793–1808
- Rank: General
- Commands: 88th Regiment of Foot (Connaught Rangers); 66th (Berkshire) Regiment of Foot

General John Thomas de Burgh, 13th Earl of Clanricarde, PC (Ire) (English: /dəˈbɜːr ... klænˈrɪkɑːrd/ də-BUR ... klan-RIK-ard; 22 September 1744 – 27 July 1808), styled The Honourable John Thomas de Burgh until 1797, was a British Army officer and politician who served as the governor of Kingston-upon-Hull from 1801 to 1808.

== Career ==
=== Military career ===
The Hon. John de Burgh, as he then was, raised the 88th Regiment of Foot, later renamed the Connaught Rangers, in 1793. Having commanded this regiment, he became Colonel of the 66th (Berkshire) Regiment of Foot (1794–1808) and later Governor of Hull (1801–1808).

In 1796, he was in command in Corsica under Sir Gilbert Elliot-Murray-Kynynmound as Viceroy of the Anglo-Corsican Kingdom and, with Commodore Horatio Nelson, planned an attack to re-take Leghorn (Livorno) in Tuscany. He subsequently removed the remaining military detachments from Corsica to Elba and evacuated the latter island in January 1797. He was promoted to full General of the Army in 1803.

=== Political career ===
After the death of his elder brother, Henry, 1st Marquess and 12th Earl of Clanricarde, in December 1797, John inherited only the Earldom (of the first creation of 1543), not the Marquessate. In 1800, he was made Earl of Clanricarde (by a second creation) in the Peerage of Ireland, with a remainder, failing male issue of his own, to his daughters Lady Hester Catherine de Burgh (wife of the 2nd Marquess of Sligo) and Lady Emily de Burgh, and the heirs male of their bodies according to priority of birth.

Lord Clanricarde, as he was from December 1797, was elected as one of the 28 original Irish representative peers in 1800, and became a Privy Councillor in 1801. He was made Governor and Custos Rotulorum (1798–1808) of County Galway.

== Cricket ==
De Burgh was also a keen cricketer. He played for Surrey in 1773 but was possibly a guest player as his name only occurs a handful of times in match reports. His contribution to the sport was as a Hambledon Club member. He joined prior to June 1772 when the club's minutes began; and was President of the club in 1784.

== Family ==
Lord Clanricarde married Elizabeth (1764–1854), a daughter of Sir Thomas Burke, 1st Baronet, of Marble Hill, County Galway, on 17 March 1799. He was succeeded by his son, Ulick John. The couple also had two daughters, Lady Hester, Marchioness of Sligo, and Lady Emily, Countess of Howth.

General Lord Clanricarde was a member of the Anglican Church, while his wife was a Catholic.

== Honours and arms ==
=== Honours ===
Country	Date	Appointment	Ribbon	Post-nominals
United Kingdom	1801–1808	Privy Council of Ireland		PC (Ire)

=== Arms ===
Coat of arms of John de Burgh, 13th Earl of Clanricarde
Crest A Cat-a-Mountain sejant guardant proper, collared and chained Or. Escutcheon Or, a cross gules in the first quarter a lion rampant sable. Supporters Two Cats-a-Mountain sejant guardant proper, collared and chained Or. Motto UNG ROY, UNG FOY, UNG LOY (One king, one faith, one law)

== Ancestry ==
Ancestors of John de Burgh, 13th Earl of Clanricarde

8. John Burke, 9th Earl of Clanricarde
4. Michael Burke, 10th Earl of Clanricarde
9. Mary Talbot
2. John Smith de Burgh, 11th Earl of Clanricarde
10. John Smith
5. Anne Smith
11. Anne Strickland
1. John de Burgh, 13th Earl of Clanricarde
12. Sir Francis Vincent, 5th Baronet
6. Sir Henry Vincent, 6th Baronet
13. Rebecca Ashe
3. Hester Amelia Vincent
14. Bazaliel Sherman
7. Elizabeth Sherman
15.

== See also ==
- House of Burgh, an Anglo-Norman and Hiberno-Norman dynasty founded in 1193

Military offices
New regiment	Colonel of the 88th Regiment of Foot; 1793–1794	Succeeded by John Reid
Preceded by Joseph Gabbett	Colonel of the 66th (Berkshire) Regiment of Foot; 1794–1808	Succeeded by Oliver Nicolls
Preceded by Hon. William Harcourt	Governor of Kingston-upon-Hull; 1801–1808	Succeeded by Sir William Medows
Honorary titles
Preceded by The Marquess of Clanricarde	Governor and Custos Rotulorum of County Galway; 1798–1808	Succeeded by The Earl of Clancarty
Parliament of the United Kingdom
New title	Representative peer for Ireland; 1800–1808	Succeeded by The Earl of Clancarty
Peerage of Ireland
Preceded by Henry de Burgh	Earl of Clanricarde; 1st creation 1797–1808	Succeeded by Ulick de Burgh
New creation	Earl of Clanricarde; 2nd creation 1800–1808	Succeeded by Ulick de Burgh
