= Seán 'ac Dhonncha =

- Also known as: Seán 'ac onna
- Born: 2 October 1919; Aird Thoir, Carna, Conamara, County Galway, Ireland
- Died: 1996 (aged 76–77)
- Genres: Irish traditional
- Occupation: Singer
- Label: Gael Linn

Seán 'ac Dhonncha (alternatively, Seán 'ac onna, Johnny Joe Pheaitsín, 2 October 1919 – 1996) was a traditional Irish singer.

Born in Carna, Conamara, County Galway the son of a fisherman, his siblings were Joe, Matt, Páraic, Bairbre, Bríd, Máiréad, Nóra, Eilís and Mary. A schoolfriend of Seosamh Ó hÉanaí, 'ac Dhonncha won a scholarship to Coláiste Éinde and qualified as a primary teacher in 1940. He taught in County Cavan from 1947, and later spent twenty five years as principal of Ahascragh national school.

He was the first traditional singer to record with Gael Linn; won a gold medal at the 1953 Oireachtas; and was awarded the Gradam Shean-Nós Cois Life in 1995. In 1971, Claddagh Records released An Aill Báin (The White Rock): Songs in Irish and English from Connemara. In 1994, Cló Iar-Chonnachta released a CD of his songs in Irish and English, entitled Seán 'ac Dhonncha: An Spailpín Fánach."

He married Bríd Ní Eidhn in 1956. They had five children.
