= Gervase Parker Bushe =

Member of parliament for Granard
- In office 1767–1776
- Preceded by: Edmond Malone
- Succeeded by: Thomas Maunsell

High Sheriff of County Kilkenny
- In office 1767–1776
- Preceded by: John Greene of Greeneville

Member of Parliament for Kilkenny City
- In office 1778–1783
- Preceded by: Charles Agar
- Succeeded by: William Cuffe

Member of Parliament for Fore
- In office 1778–1783
- Preceded by: James FitzGerald
- Succeeded by: Stephen Francis William Fremantle

Member of Parliament for Lanesborough
- In office 1790–1793
- Preceded by: Robert Dillon
- Succeeded by: Edmond Stanley

Personal details
- Born: bapt. 22 December 1744 Dublin, Ireland
- Died: 12 August 1793 (aged 48) Kilfane, County Kilkenny, Ireland
- Education: Christ Church, Oxford

Gervase Parker Bushe (1744 – 13 August 1793) was an Irish landowner and MP.

He was the son of Amyas Bushe of Dublin and his wife Elizabeth Parker. He was educated at Christ Church, Oxford (where he matriculated in 1763) and at Trinity College Dublin (where he graduated BA, LLB and LLD). He became a lawyer and lived at Kilfane in County Kilkenny.

He served as an MP in the Parliament of Ireland for Granard from 1767 to 1776, for Kilkenny City from 1778 to 1783, for Fore from 1783 to 1790 and for Lanesborough from 1790 to 1793. He was appointed High Sheriff of County Kilkenny for 1768-69.

He was a member of the Royal Irish Academy. In a paper presented to the Academy in 1789 he calculated the population of Ireland as approximately 4 million.

He died in August 1793 at Kilfane. He had married Mary Grattan, the daughter of James Grattan, the Recorder of Dublin and MP for Dublin City and the sister of Henry Grattan, the anti-union MP. They had 10 children.

Parliament of Ireland
Preceded by Edmond Malone; Robert Sibthorpe	Member of Parliament for Granard; 1767–1776; With: Robert Sibthorpe 1761–1768; Anthony Malone 1768–1769; Richard Malone 1769–1776	Succeeded by Thomas Maunsell; John Kilpatrick
Political offices
Preceded by Arthur Webb	High Sheriff of County Kilkenny; 1768–1769	Succeeded by Edward Deane
Parliament of Ireland
Preceded by Charles Agar; Sir Haydocke Morres	Member of Parliament for Kilkenny City; 1778–1783; With: Eland Mossom 1777–1783	Succeeded by William Cuffe; John Butler, 17th Earl of Ormonde
Preceded by James FitzGerald; Cornelius O'Keefe	Member of Parliament for Fore; 1783–1790; With: George Nugent 1780–1792	Succeeded by Stephen Francis William Fremantle; John Macartney
Preceded by Robert Dillon; Cornelius Bolton	Member of Parliament for Lanesborough; 1790–1793; With: Stephen Moore 1790–1798	Succeeded by Edmond Stanley; John La Touche
