= Henry de Burgh, Marquess of Clanricarde =

Irish politician and peer (1742–1797)

The Most Honourable The Marquess of Clanricarde KP PC (Ire)
- Annraoi de Búrca
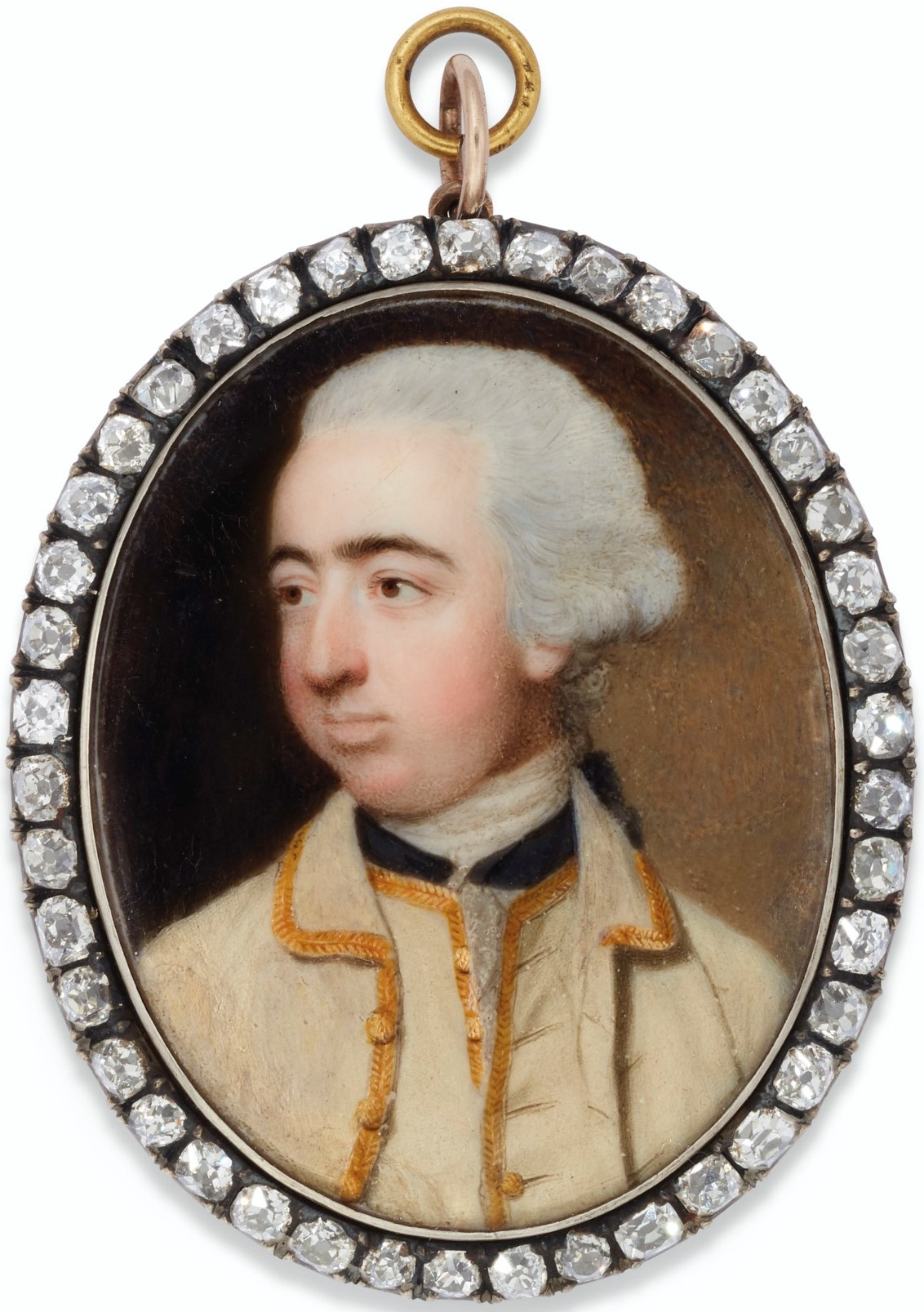
- Portrait attributed to John Smart

Governor and Custos Rotulorum of County Galway
- In office 1792–1797
- Preceded by: Denis Daly
- Succeeded by: The Earl of Clanricarde
Parliamentary offices
Member of the Irish House of Lords
Hereditary Peerage; 21 April 1782 – 8 December 1797
Preceded by	John Smith de Burgh
Succeeded by	John de Burgh
Member of Parliament for County Galway
In office 1768–1768 Serving with Denis Daly
Preceded by	Charles Daly; Richard Trench
Succeeded by	William Trench; Denis Daly

Personal details
- Born: Henry de Burgh; 8 January 1742 Kensington, London
- Died: 8 December 1797 (aged 55)
- Spouse: Lady Urania Anne Paulet (m. 1785)
- Parents: John Smith de Burgh, 11th Earl of Clanricarde; Hester Amelia Vincent
- Relatives: John de Burgh, 13th Earl of Clanricarde (brother)
- Education: Eton College

Henry de Burgh, Marquess of Clanricarde, KP, PC (Ire) (/dəˈbɜːr ... klænˈrɪkɑːrd/ də-BUR ... klan-RIK-ard; 8 January 1742 – 8 December 1797), styled Lord Dunkellin (/dʌnˈkɛlɪn/ dun-KEL-in) until 1782 and The Earl of Clanricarde from 1782 until 1789, was an Irish peer and politician who was MP for County Galway (1768) and Governor and Custos Rotulorum of County Galway (1792–1797).

== Career ==
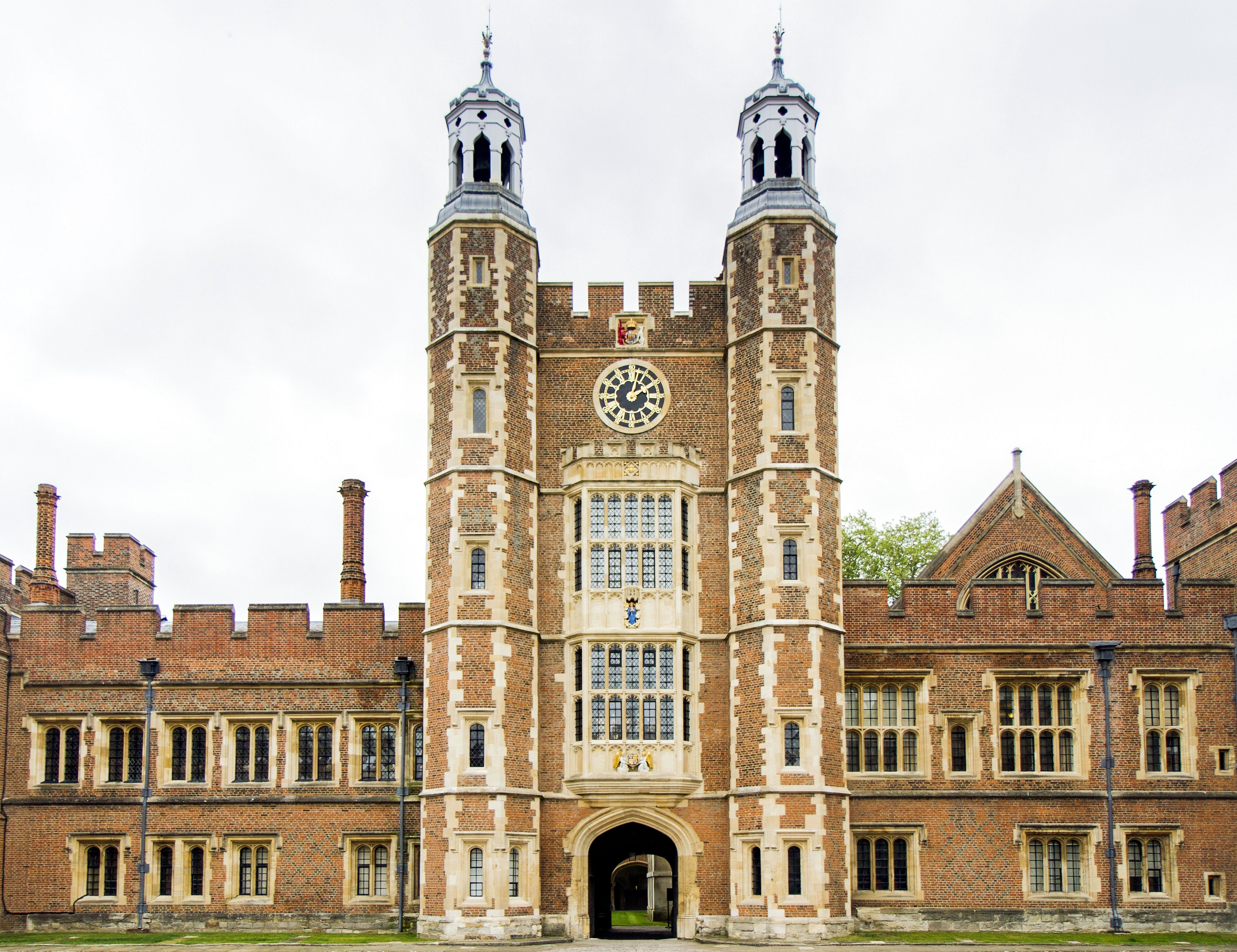
Eton College, Windsor, Berkshire.

Henry was the son of the 11th Earl of Clanricarde, and from 1753 to 1758 was educated at Eton College. In 1768 he was a Member of Parliament in the Irish House of Commons representing County Galway. He succeeded his father as Earl of Clanricarde (among other titles) on 21 April 1782, and became one of the founding Knights of the Order of St Patrick on 5 February 1783, and on 6 March of the same year was invested as a member of the Privy Council of Ireland.

From 1792 until his death on 8 December 1797, he was Governor and Custos Rotulorum of County Galway.

== Family ==
On 17 March 1785, he married Lady Urania Anne Paulet (1766–1843), daughter of George Paulet, 12th Marquess of Winchester, but they had no children. His widow subsequently married, on 28 October 1799, to Col. Peter Kingston (d.1807). She married for the third time, on 22 May 1813, to Admiral The Hon. Sir Joseph Sydney Yorke (1768–1831).

== Honours and Arms ==
=== Honours ===
Country	Date	Appointment	Ribbon	Post-nominals
United Kingdom	1783 – 1797	Knight of the Most Illustrious Order of St Patrick		KP
United Kingdom	1783 – 1797	Member of the Privy Council of Ireland		PC (Ire)

=== Arms ===
Coat of arms of Henry de Burgh, Marquess of Clanricarde
Crest A Cat-a-Mountain sejant guardant proper, collared and chained Or. Escutcheon Or, a cross gules in the first quarter a lion rampant sable. Supporters Two Cats-a-Mountain sejant guardant proper, collared and chained Or. Motto UNG ROY, UNG FOY, UNG LOY (One king, one faith, one law) Orders Order of St Patrick

== Ancestry ==
Ancestors of Henry de Burgh, Marquess of Clanricarde

8. John Burke, 9th Earl of Clanricarde
4. Michael Burke, 10th Earl of Clanricarde
9. Marty Talbot
2. John Smith de Burgh, 11th Earl of Clanricarde
10. John Smith
5. Anne Smith
11. Anne Strickland
1. Henry de Burgh, Marquess of Clanricarde
12. Sir Francis Vincent, 5th Baronet
6. Sir Henry Vincent, 6th Baronet
13. Rebecca Ashe
3. Hester Amelia Vincent
14. Bazaliel Sherman
7. Elizabeth Sherman
15.

== See also ==
- House of Burgh, an Anglo-Norman and Hiberno-Norman dynasty founded in 1193

Parliament of Ireland
Preceded by Charles Daly; Richard Trench	Member of Parliament for County Galway; 1768; With: Denis Daly	Succeeded by William Power Keating Trench; Denis Daly
Honorary titles
Preceded by Denis Daly	Governor and Custos Rotulorum of County Galway; 1792–1797	Succeeded by The Earl of Clanricarde
Peerage of Ireland
New creation	Marquess of Clanricarde; 1789–1797	Extinct
Preceded by John Smith de Burgh	Earl of Clanricarde; 1782–1797	Succeeded by John de Burgh
