= Baron Clonbrock =

Irish noble family

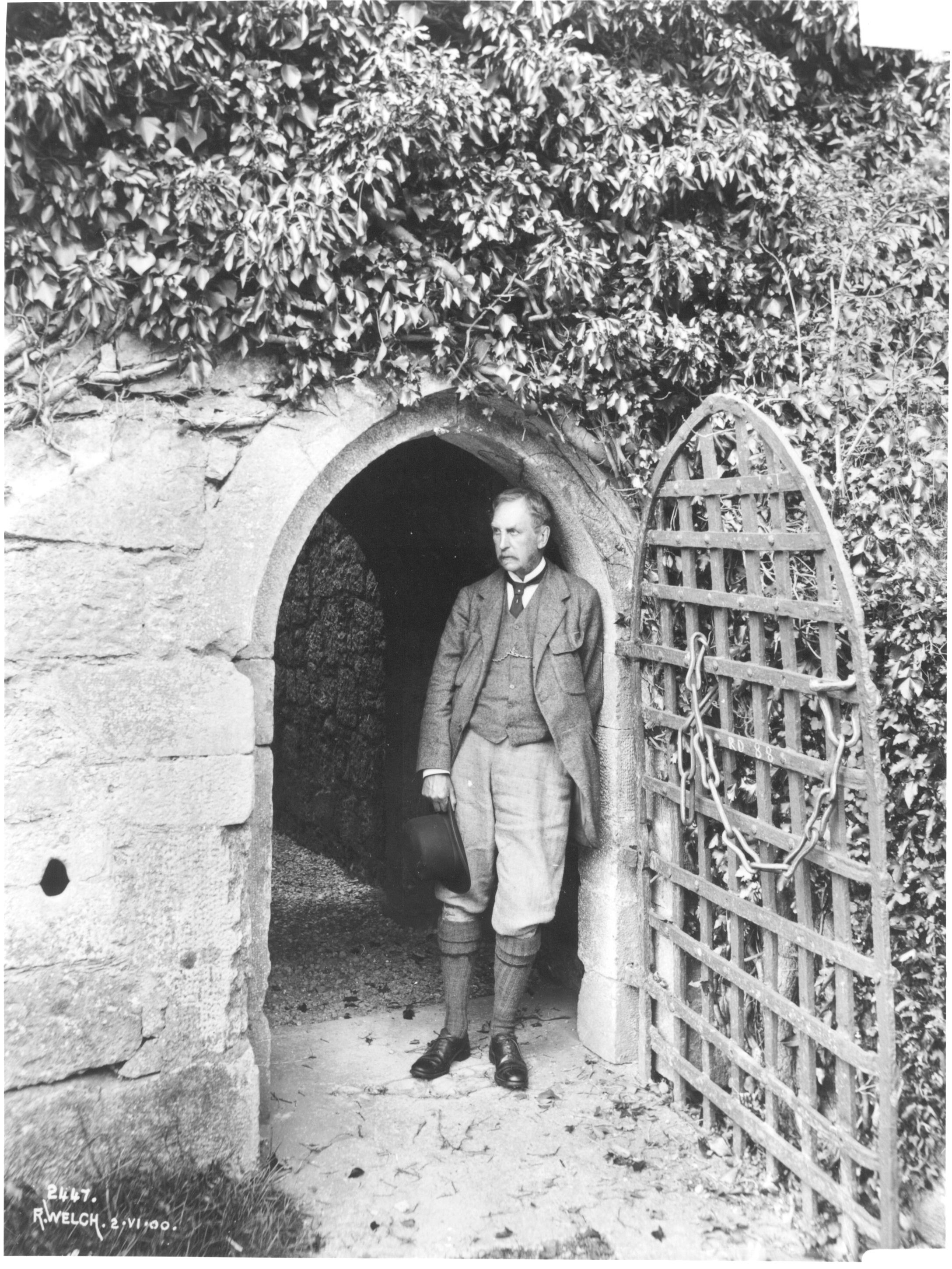
The fourth Baron Clonbrock at Clonbrock Castle in 1900.

Baron Clonbrock, of Clonbrock in County Galway, was a title in the Peerage of Ireland. It was created on 3 June 1790 for Robert Dillon, who had earlier represented Lanesborough in the Irish House of Commons. His grandson, the third Baron, sat in the House of Lords as an Irish representative peer and served as Lord-Lieutenant of Galway. He was succeeded by his eldest son, the fourth Baron. He was also an Irish Representative Peer and Lord-Lieutenant of Galway. The title became extinct on the death of his son, the fifth Baron, on 1 November 1926.

This branch of the Dillon family was descended from Gerald Dillon, brother of Sir Richard Dillon, ancestor of the Earls of Roscommon. Gerald's grandson Thomas Dillon, who died in 1606, was Chief Justice of Connacht. An earlier ancestor, Sir James Dillon, was the brother of Sir Maurice Dillon, ancestor of the Viscounts Dillon. Robert Dillon, grandfather of the first Baron, represented Dungarvan in the Irish Parliament.

== Barons Clonbrock (1790) ==
- Robert Dillon, 1st Baron Clonbrock (1754–1795)
- Luke Dillon, 2nd Baron Clonbrock (1780–1826)
- Robert Dillon, 3rd Baron Clonbrock (1807–1893)
- Luke Gerald Dillon, 4th Baron Clonbrock (1834–1917)
- Robert Edward Dillon, 5th Baron Clonbrock (1869–1926)

== See also ==
- Ahascragh#Clonbrock Estate
- Earl of Roscommon
- Viscount Dillon

== Sources ==
- Kidd, Charles (1903). Debrett's peerage, baronetage, knightage, and companionage. London: Dean & Son. p. 244.
- Hesilrige, Arthur G. M. (1921). Debrett's Peerage and Titles of courtesy. London: Dean & Son. p. 219.
