= Custos Rotulorum of County Galway =

The Custos Rotulorum of County Galway was the highest civil officer in County Galway. The position was later combined with that of Lord Lieutenant of Galway.

== Incumbents ==
- Richard de Burgh, 8th Earl of Clanricarde (Died after 1708)
- 1754-? Sir Thomas Prendergast, 2nd Baronet
- 1792–1797 Henry de Burgh, 1st Marquess of Clanricarde and 12th Earl
- 1798–1808 John de Burgh, 13th Earl of Clanricarde
- ?1808–?1837 Richard Trench, 2nd Earl of Clancarty (died 1837)

For later custodes rotulorum, see Lord Lieutenant of Galway
