= Robert Dillon, 1st Baron Clonbrock =

Irish politician

The Right Honourable The Baron Clonbrock PC

Member of the Irish Parliament for Lanesborough
- In office 1776–1790 Serving with: John Hely-Hutchinson (1776–1783); David La Touche 1783; Cornelius Bolton (1783–1790)
- Preceded by: Matthias Earbery; Edward Bellingham Swan
- Succeeded by: Gervase Parker Bushe; Stephen Moore

Personal details
- Born: Robert Dillon; 27 January 1754
- Died: 22 July 1795 (aged 41)
- Spouse: Letitia Greene (m. 1776)
- Parents: Luke Dillon; Bridget Kelly

Robert Dillon, 1st Baron Clonbrock PC (27 February 1754 – 22 July 1795), was an Irish politician.

Dillon was the son of Luke Dillon and Bridget Kelly, daughter of John Kelly. His grandfather Robert Dillon had represented Dungarvan in the Irish House of Commons. Dillon was himself returned to the Irish Parliament for Lanesborough in 1776, a seat he held until 1790, when he was raised to the Peerage of Ireland as Baron Clonbrock, of Clonbrock in the County of Galway. He was appointed an Irish Privy Counsellor in 1795, but died before he could be sworn in.

Lord Clonbrock married Letitia Greene, daughter of John Greene, of Old Abbey, County Limerick, in 1776. He died at Clonbrock, County Galway, in July 1795, aged 41, and was succeeded in the barony by his son, Luke.

Parliament of Ireland
Preceded by Matthias Earbery; Edward Bellingham Swan	Member of Parliament for Lanesborough; 1776–1790; With: John Hely-Hutchinson 1776–1783; David La Touche 1783; Cornelius Bolton 1783–1790	Succeeded by Gervase Parker Bushe; Stephen Moore
Peerage of Ireland
New creation	Baron Clonbrock; 1790–1795	Succeeded by Luke Dillon
