= Luke Dillon, 4th Baron Clonbrock =

Irish peer (1834-1917)

The Right Honourable The Lord Clonbrock KP PC (Ire)
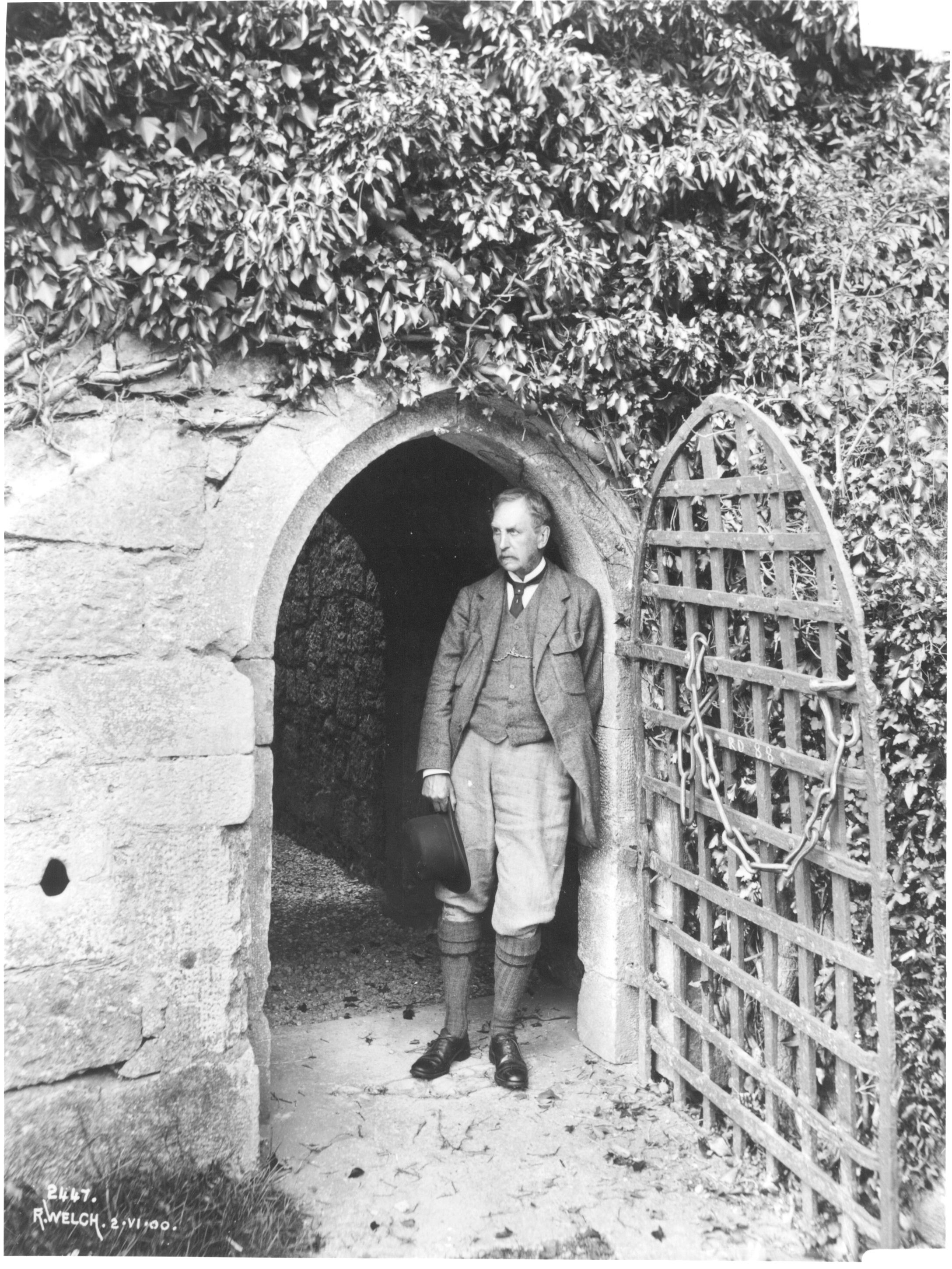
- Lord Clonbrock at Clonbrock Castle in 1900

High Sheriff of County Galway
- In office 1865–1866
- Preceded by: Richard D'Arcy of New Forest
- Succeeded by: John Archer Daly (né Blake) of Raford

Lord Lieutenant of Galway
- In office 1892–1917
- Preceded by: The Lord Clonbrock
- Succeeded by: The Lord Killanin

Personal details
- Born: 10 March 1834
- Died: 12 May 1917 (aged 83)
- Spouse: Augusta Caroline Crofton (m. 1866)
- Children: 4
- Parent: Robert Dillon (father)
- Relatives: Francis Spencer (maternal grandfather); Edward Crofton (father-in-law)

Luke Gerald Dillon, 4th Baron Clonbrock KP PC (Ire) (10 March 1834 – 12 May 1917) was an Irish peer.

In 1865, he was appointed High Sheriff of County Galway. He became Baron Clonbrock in 1893 on the death of his father Robert Dillon, 3rd Baron Clonbrock and was appointed a Knight of the Order of St Patrick on 29 August 1900.

He married Augusta Caroline Crofton, daughter of Edward Crofton, 2nd Baron Crofton of Mote and Lady Georgina Paget, on 18 July 1866 at Roscommon, County Roscommon, Ireland. As a result of her marriage, Hon. Augusta Caroline Crofton was styled as Baroness Clonbrock on 4 December 1893.

The finding aid of the collection related to the personal and political papers of the family of Dillon, Barons Clonbrock, Ahascragh (County Galway, c.1600-1960) was compiled by Stephen Ball, at the National Library of Ireland.

Honorary titles
Preceded by The Lord Clonbrock	Lord Lieutenant of Galway; 1892–1917	Succeeded by The Lord Killanin
Political offices
Preceded by The Lord Carbery	Representative peer for Ireland; 1895–1917	Succeeded by The Earl of Kingston
Peerage of Ireland
Preceded by Robert Dillon	Baron Clonbrock; 1893–1917	Succeeded by Robert Dillon
