= Richard Burke, 4th Earl of Clanricarde =

Irish noble (1572–1635)

The Right Honourable The Earl of Clanricarde PC (Ire)
- Ricard de Búrca

Governor of County Galway
- In office 1616–1635

Lord President of Connaught
- In office 1604–1616
- Succeeded by: The Viscount Wilmot
Parliamentary Offices
Member of the House of Lords
Lord Temporal
Hereditary Peerage (Viscount Tunbridge: 1624) (Earl of St Albans: 1628); 3 April 1624 – 12 November 1635
Preceded by	New Creation
Succeeded by	Ulick Burke
Member of the Irish House of Lords
Hereditary Peerage; 1601 – 12 November 1635
Preceded by	Ulick Burke
Succeeded by	Ulick Burke

Personal details
- Born: Richard Burke; 1572
- Died: November 12, 1635
- Spouse: Frances Walsingham
- Children: Ulick, & others
- Parents: Ulick, 3rd Earl of Clanricarde; Honora Burke
- Education: Christ Church, Oxford
- Military career
- Allegiance: Kingdom of Ireland
- Service years: 1593–1603
- Rank: Colonel
- Commands: Foot Regiment
- Conflicts: Nine Years' War; Battle of Kinsale (1601)

Richard Burke (or de Burgh), 4th Earl of Clanricarde PC (Ire) (/dəˈbɜːr ... klænˈrɪkɑːrd/ də-BUR ... klan-RIK-ard; 1572 – 12 November 1635), styled Lord Dunkellin (/dʌnˈkɛlɪn/ dun-KEL-in) until 1601, was an Irish nobleman and politician.

He was the son of Ulick Burke, 3rd Earl of Clanricarde. Knighted in 1602 for his exploits as leader of the English cavalry during the Battle of Kinsale, he would later serve as Lord President of Connaught from 1604 to 1616, Governor of Galway from 1616, and as a member of the Privy Council of Ireland (1625). Having established himself as the largest and most influential landowner in Connacht, his later life was characterized by animosity between him and an increasingly hostile and acquisitive Dublin government.

== Birth and origins ==
Family tree

Richard Burke with wife, parents, and selected relatives. (Note: Also see the lists of siblings and children in the text.)

Richard; 2nd Earl d. 1582	Margaret; O'Brien
Ulick; 3rd Earl d. 1601	Honora; Burke b. c. 1535
Richard; 4th Earl; 1572–1635	Frances; Walsingham; 1567–1633	William; Burke d. 1626	Joan; O'Shaugh- nessy
Ulick; 1st Marquess; 1604–1657	Richard; 6th Earl d. 1666	William; 7th Earl d. 1687	Lettice; Shirley c. 1617 – 1655
Richard; 8th Earl d. aft. 1708	John; 9th Earl; 1642–1722	Mary; Talbot d. 1711

Legend

XXX	Subject of the article	XXX	Earls & Marquesses of Clanricarde

Richard was born in 1572, the second but eldest surviving son of Ulick Burke and his wife Honora Burke. His father was the 3rd Earl of Clanricarde. His father's family was Old English and descended from William de Burgh (died 1206) who arrived in Ireland during the reign of King Henry II, and was the founder of the House of Burgh in Ireland.

His mother was a daughter of John Burke of Clogheroka and Tullyra, County Galway. Her family was a cadet branch of his father's line.

Richard had brothers and sisters who are listed in his father's article.

== Early life ==
Burke studied at Christ Church, Oxford from 1584 to 1598 and completed an M.A. degree. Burke fought for Queen Elizabeth I against the rebel Irish lords and their Spanish allies during the Nine Years' War.

== Career ==
On 20 May 1601 Burke succeeded his father as the 4th Earl of Clanricarde. Richard was knighted in 1602 for his exploits as leader of the English cavalry during the Battle of Kinsale, he served as Lord President of Connaught from 1604 to 1616, Governor of Galway from 1616, and was appointed as a member of the Privy Council of Ireland in 1625.

== Marriage and children ==
In 1603, Clanricarde married Frances Walsingham, the widow of Robert Devereux, 2nd Earl of Essex, daughter of Francis Walsingham.

Richard and Frances had one son:

1. Ulick, his successor

—and two daughters:

1. Mary, married Edward Butler of Ballinahinch, 6th son of James Butler, 9th Earl of Ormond as his 2nd wife
2. Honora (d. 1661), married 1st Garrat McCloghlan and 2ndly John Paulet, 5th Marquis of Winchester

== Later life ==
By 1633 he was not only one of the principal landowners in Ireland, but virtually all-powerful in County Galway. This aroused the resentment of the Dublin Government, which decided to use the method of empanelling juries to "find" defective titles, in order to recover the lands in question for the English Crown. In 1634 Strafford held such a jury in Portumna Castle. However the jury refused to deliver the desired verdict.

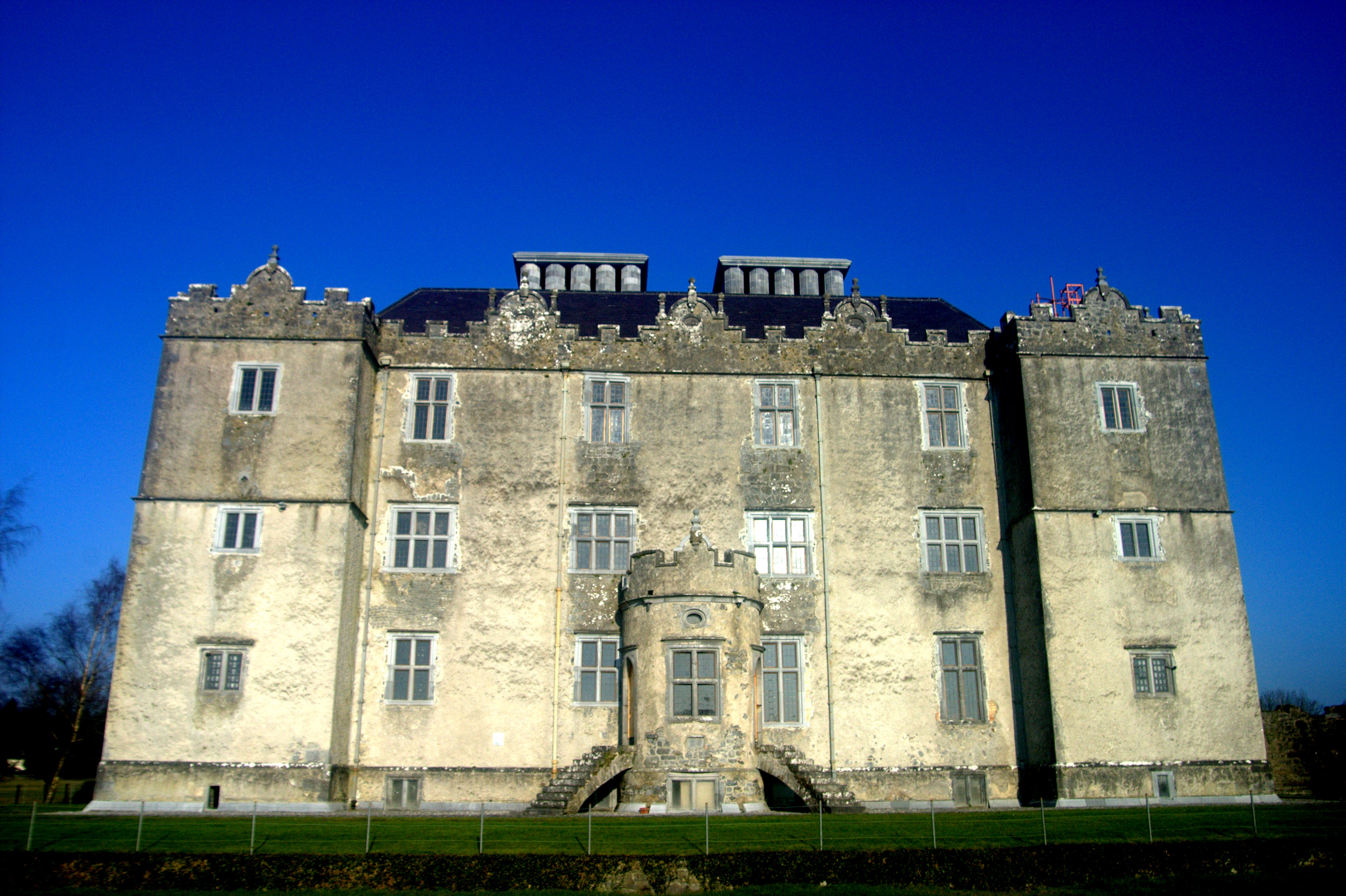
Portumna Castle was commissioned by Richard Burke and completed in 1617.

== Death ==
The treatment that Clanricarde experienced from the Lord Deputy of Ireland, Thomas Wentworth, was said to have hastened his death in November 1635.

Wentworth, however, pointed to the Earl's advancing years as the obvious cause, and asked sarcastically whether he was to blame for a man being over sixty. The feud, which was continued by Clanricarde's son and heir, was in the long run very damaging to Strafford, who apparently did not reflect on the close connections that Clanricarde, through his wife, had with just that faction of the English nobility, the Rich-Devereux clan, who were most hostile to Strafford.

== Arms ==
Coat of arms of Richard Burke, 4th Earl of Clanricarde
Crest A Cat-a-Mountain sejant guardant proper, collared and chained Or. Escutcheon Or, a cross gules in the first quarter a lion rampant sable. Supporters Two Cats-a-Mountain sejant guardant proper, collared and chained Or. Motto UNG ROY, UNG FOY, UNG LOY (One king, one faith, one law)

== Ancestry ==
Ancestors of Richard Burke, 4th Earl of Clanricarde

8. Ulick na gCeann Burke, 1st Earl of Clanricarde
4. Richard Burke, 2nd Earl of Clanricarde
9. Grany or Grace O'Carroll
2. Ulick Burke, 3rd Earl of Clanricarde
10. Murrough O'Brien, 1st Earl of Thomond
5. Margaret O'Brien
11. Eleanor FitzGerald
1. Richard Burke, 4th Earl of Clanricarde
12.
6. John Burke of Clogheroka
13.
3. Honora Burke
14.
7.
15.

== See also ==
- House of Burgh, an Anglo-Norman and Hiberno-Norman dynasty founded in 1193

== Notes and references ==
=== Sources ===
- Adams, Constance Louisa (1904). Castles of Ireland – Some Fortress Histories and Legends. London: Elliot Stock. OCLC 751487142.
- Burke, John; Burke, Bernard (1844). Encyclopædia of Heraldry: Or General Armory of England, Scotland, and Ireland, Comprising a Registry of All Armorial Bearings from the Earliest to the Present Time, Including the Late Grants by the College of Arms. H. G. Bohn.
- Burke, Bernard (1884). The General Armory of England, Scotland, Ireland, and Wales; comprising a registry of armorial bearings from the earliest to the present time. University of California Libraries. London: Harrison & Sons.
- Burke, Bernard; Burke, Ashworth Peter (1915). A Genealogical and Heraldic History of the Peerage and Baronetage, the Privy Council, Knightage and Companionage (77th ed.). London: Harrison. OCLC 1155471554.
- Cokayne, George Edward (1913). Gibbs, Vicary (ed.). The complete peerage of England, Scotland, Ireland, Great Britain and the United Kingdom, extant, extinct, or dormant. Vol. III (2nd ed.). London: St Catherine Press. OCLC 228661424. – Canonteign to Cutts (for Clanricarde)

Government offices
Unknown	Lord President of Connaught; 1604–1616	Succeeded by The Viscount Wilmot
Unknown	Governor of County Galway; 1616–1635	Unknown
Peerage of Ireland
Preceded by Ulick Burke	Earl of Clanricarde; 1601–1635	Succeeded by Ulick Burke
Peerage of England
New creation	Earl of St Albans; 1628–1635	Succeeded by Ulick Burke
New creation	Viscount Tunbridge; 1624–1635	Succeeded by Ulick Burke
