= Ahascragh =

Village in County Galway, Ireland

Ahascragh Áth Eascrach
- Village
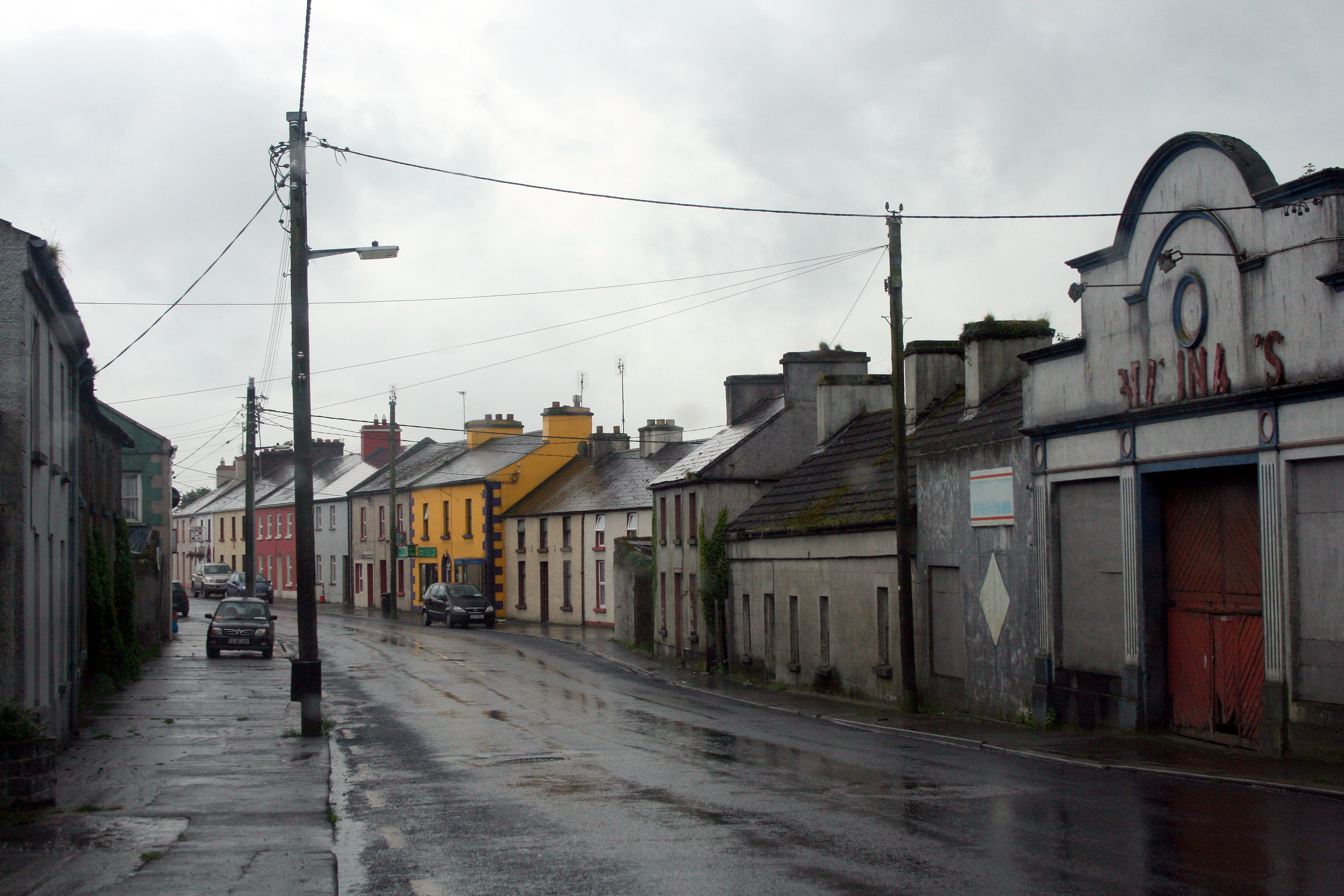
- Street in Ahascragh in 2008

- Location in Ireland
- Coordinates: 53°23′49″N 8°20′06″W
- Country: Ireland
- Province: Connacht
- County: County Galway

Population (2022)
  - Total: 186
- Time zone: UTC+0 (WET)
  - Summer (DST): UTC-1 (IST (WEST))
- Irish Grid Reference: M777385

Ahascragh (Irish: Áth Eascrach) is a village in east County Galway, Ireland. It is located 11 km (7 mi) north-west of Ballinasloe on the Ahascragh/Bunowen River, a tributary of the River Suck. The R358 regional road passes through the village. As of the 2022 census, it had a population of 186 people. The village is in a civil parish of the same name.

== History ==
=== Early history ===
Evidence of ancient settlement in the area includes ringfort, souterrain and holy well sites in the townlands of Weston, Ahascragh East and Ahascragh West.

The patron saint of the village is Saint Cuan. His death is recorded in the Annals of the Four Masters in 788 A.D. St. Cuan's Well lies to the northeast. While some sources indicate the existence of a pre-Norman church within the village, associated with this saint, the area's current Roman Catholic and Church of Ireland churches date from c. 1815 and c. 1800 respectively.

According to the Annals of the Four Masters, the battle of Ahascragh took place in 1307 between English forces and the local O'Kelly Chieftains. Clonbrock Castle, near Ahascragh, is a medieval tower house which dates to the late 15th century and is traditionally associated with the O'Kelly family.

=== Estates ===
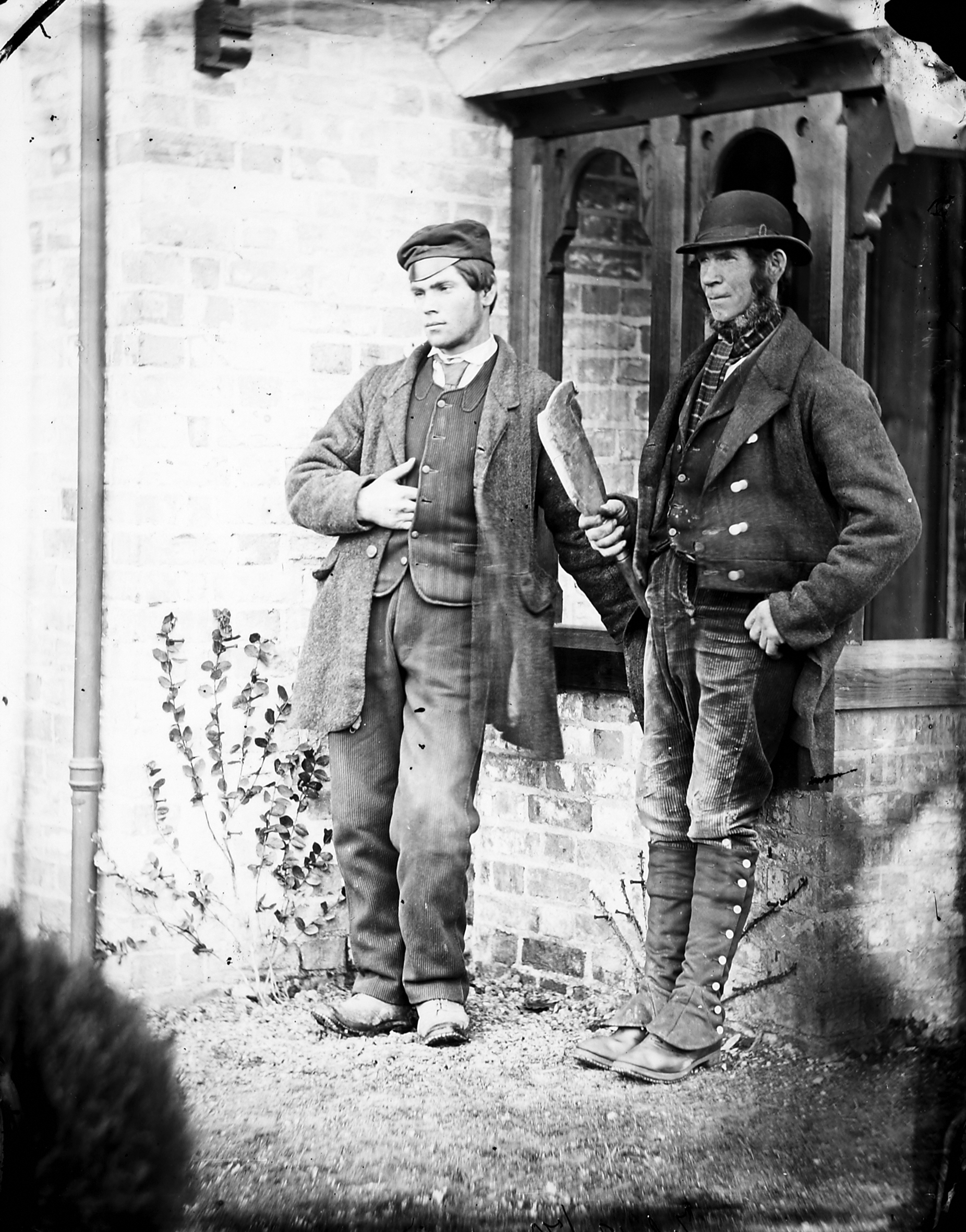
Workmen on the Clonbrock Estate, Ahascragh in the 1870s

Ahascragh had two Anglo-Irish seats of residence, located in Castlegar and Clonbrock, with respective estate houses.

In Castlegar sat the Mahon family. The Mahons were settled at Castlegar from the late 17th century. They intermarried on a number of occasions with members of the Browne family of Westport. In 1819, the head of the family became a baronet. In the 1830s, at the time of the first Ordnance Survey, Ross Mahon was the proprietor of several townlands in the parish of Ahascragh. The Mahon estate was one of the principal lessors in the parish of Grange, barony of Loughrea at the time of Griffith's Valuation (1848–1864). The Mahons also held extensive lands in the baronies of Clonmacnowen and Killian. In the 1870s, the Castlegar Estate amounted to over 32 square kilometres (7,900 acres) of County Galway as well as over 3.2 square kilometres (790 acres) in the parish of Termonbarry, barony of Ballintober North in County Roscommon. In 1906, Sir William Mahon held over 4.9 square kilometres (1,200 acres) of untenanted land in the Ahascragh area. MacLochlainn writes that most of the estate was sold to the Land Commission in 1977. In 1979 the house was sold by the Mahons to John Horan, who advertised the house for sale again in 1988. There is still a house at this site.

In Clonbrock sat the Dillon family, who acquired the lands from the O'Kellys (O'Ceallaigh) in the late 16th century. Clonbrock's estate house, now in ruin, was built in the 1780s. By 1824 the then Lord Clonbrock, Luke Dillon 2nd Baron Clonbrock, was listed as a resident proprietor in County Galway. At the time of Griffith's Valuation (1848–1864), the then Lord Clonbrock was one of the principal lessors in the parishes of Ahascragh, Fohanagh, Killalaghtan and Killosolan in the barony of Kilconnell and Killoran in the barony of Longford. In the 1870s, the Clonbrock estate amounted to over 110 square kilometres (27,000 acres). The lands, house and demesne at Cahir, barony of Clonmacnowen, owned by James Dillon, were offered for sale in the Encumbered Estates Court in July 1854. In 1906, Lord Clonbrock held over 8.1 square kilometres (2,000 acres) of untenanted land and the mansion house at Clonbrock. Sold by the Dillon family in the 1970s, the house was severely damaged by fire in 1986.

== Education ==
The national (primary) school in Ahascragh, Eglish National School, is one of several in the broader parish and had approximately 40 pupils enrolled as of 2009.

== Sport and leisure ==
Ahascragh-Fohenagh GAA, the local Gaelic Athletic Association club, is based in nearby Fohenagh.

Species in the local Bunowen River include Wild Brown Trout. The fishery is part of the Shannon Regional Fisheries Board's "Midland Fisheries Group" of controlled waters, and anglers require a fishing permit (ticket charge) to fish there.

== Popular culture ==
The RTÉ show, Don't Feed the Gondolas presented by Sean Moncrieff, satirised small village Ireland at the end of each show, choosing Ahascragh and the fictional "Head of the Parish Co-mit-tea" Monica Loolly as its instrument.

== People ==
- Philip Treacy (b.1967), a milliner based in London, was born and raised on Church Street in Ahascragh
- Seán 'ac Donncha (1919–1996), an Irish singer who was the headmaster in Ahascragh's national school
- Eamon Gilmore (b.1955), born in the village of Caltra in the parish of Ahascragh, is a former Tánaiste and previous leader of the Labour Party
- Mary Harney (b.1953), also from the area, was a leader of the Progressive Democrats and a former Tánaiste
- Rónán Mullen (b.1970), a university panel member of Seanad Éireann and an independent politician
- Fr. Kevin Reynolds (fl.1970s), a priest subjected to a defamation by Raidió Teilifís Éireann (RTÉ) in Mission to Prey

== See also ==
- List of towns and villages in Ireland
