= St. Cuan's Well =

- Tobar Chuáin (Irish)
- St. Cavan's Well; Cornamucklagh Holy Well
- Location within Ireland
- 53.415304°N 8.316109°W
- Type: holy well
- Location: Castlegar East, Ahascragh, County Galway, Ireland

National monument of Ireland
- Official name: Castlegar East
- Reference no.: 467

St. Cuan's Well is a holy well located near Ahascragh in County Galway, Ireland. The well site, and the nearby cross slabs, is protected as a National Monument.

== Location ==
St. Cuan's Well is located in the townland of Castlegar East approximately 2.3 km (1.4 mi) northeast of Ahascragh, 4 km (2.5 mi) west of the River Suck. The holy well is surrounded by a low wall and there is a cross slab next to this enclosure.

== History ==
Saint Cúan (died AD 752) was an Irish abbot. A pattern was held here on 15 October. According to local folklore, as recorded in the Irish Folklore Commission's "School's Collection", the water at the site was associated with miraculous cures and it was claimed that it could not be boiled. There was formerly a rag tree beside the well.
