= Cúan =

Saint Cúan (died 752) was an Irish abbot who was the founder of many churches and monasteries in Ireland. He lived to nearly 100 years. Little is known about him, but he is mentioned in the Annals of Inisfallen as the abbot Liath Mo-Chaemóc. St. Cuan's Well, near Ahascragh, is a holy well associated with him. Saint Cúan is commemorated on 1 January by Western Rite Orthodox communities.
