= Lord Lieutenant of Galway =

Representative of the British monarch in County Galway

This is a list of people who have held the post of Lord Lieutenant of County Galway.

There were lieutenants of counties in Ireland until the reign of James II, when they were renamed governors. The office of Lord Lieutenant was recreated on 23 August 1831 and was abolished in 1922, when Galway ceased to be part of the United Kingdom.

== Governors ==
- William Trench, 1st Earl of Clancarty
- Denis Daly: –1791
- Henry de Burgh, 1st Marquess of Clanricarde: 1792–1797
- Joseph Henry Blake, 1st Baron Wallscourt: 1798–1803
- Richard Trench, 2nd Earl of Clancarty: 1802–1831
- John Prendergast Smyth, 1st Viscount Gort: 1812–1817
- Charles Vereker, 2nd Viscount Gort: 1814–1831

== Lord Lieutenants ==
- Ulick de Burgh, 1st Marquess of Clanricarde: 7 October 1831 – 10 April 1874
- Robert Dillon, 3rd Baron Clonbrock: 28 May 1874 – June 1892
- Luke Dillon, 4th Baron Clonbrock: 13 June 1892 – 12 May 1917
- Martin Morris, 2nd Baron Killanin: 17 April 1918 – 1922
