= Governor of Galway =

Historic military role at Galway, Ireland

The Governor of Galway was a military officer who commanded the garrison at Galway in the west of Ireland. The post became a sinecure and in 1833 was to be abolished from the next vacancy.

== List of governors ==
- 1616: Richard Burke, 4th Earl of Clanricarde (died 1635)
- Ulick Burke, 1st Marquess of Clanricarde (died 1657)
- Henry de Burgh
- 1651: General Preston (fled to France, 1651)
- 1652: Colonel Peter Stubbers (for Parliament)
- 1655: Colonel Thomas Sadleir
- –1691: Henry Dillon, 8th Viscount Dillon
- 1691: Sir Henry Belasyse
- John Eyre
- 1712: Michael Burke, 10th Earl of Clanricarde
- 1714: John Ussher
- 1718: George St George, 1st Baron St George
- 1747–: Stratford Eyre (died 1765)
- 1768–1793: Robert Sandford
- 1793–1825: Peter Daly
- 1826–1839: Sir John Elley
