= John Smith de Burgh, 11th Earl of Clanricarde =

Irish peer (1720–1782)

The Right Honourable The Earl of Clanricarde FRS FSA
- Seaán de Búrca

Member of the Irish House of Lords
- Hereditary Peerage; 28 November 1726 – 21 April 1782
- Preceded by: Michael Burke
- Succeeded by: Henry de Burgh

Personal details
- Born: John Smith Burke; 11 November 1720 Galway, Ireland
- Died: 21 April 1782 (aged 61) Portumna Castle, Galway, Ireland
- Resting place: Athenry, Galway
- Spouse: Hester Amelia Vincent (m. 1740–1782)
- Children: Lady Hester Amelia de Burgh; Lady Margaret Augusta de Burgh; Henry de Burgh, 1st Marquess of Clanricarde; General John Thomas de Burgh, 13th Earl of Clanricarde
- Parents: Michael Burke; Anne Smith
- Education: Winchester College

John Smith de Burgh, 11th Earl of Clanricarde FRS FSA (/dəˈbɜːr ... klænˈrɪkɑːrd/ də-BUR ... klan-RIK-ard; né Burke; 11 November 1720 – 21 April 1782), styled Lord Dunkellin (/dʌnˈkɛlɪn/ dun-KEL-in) until 1726, was an Irish peer.

== Background ==
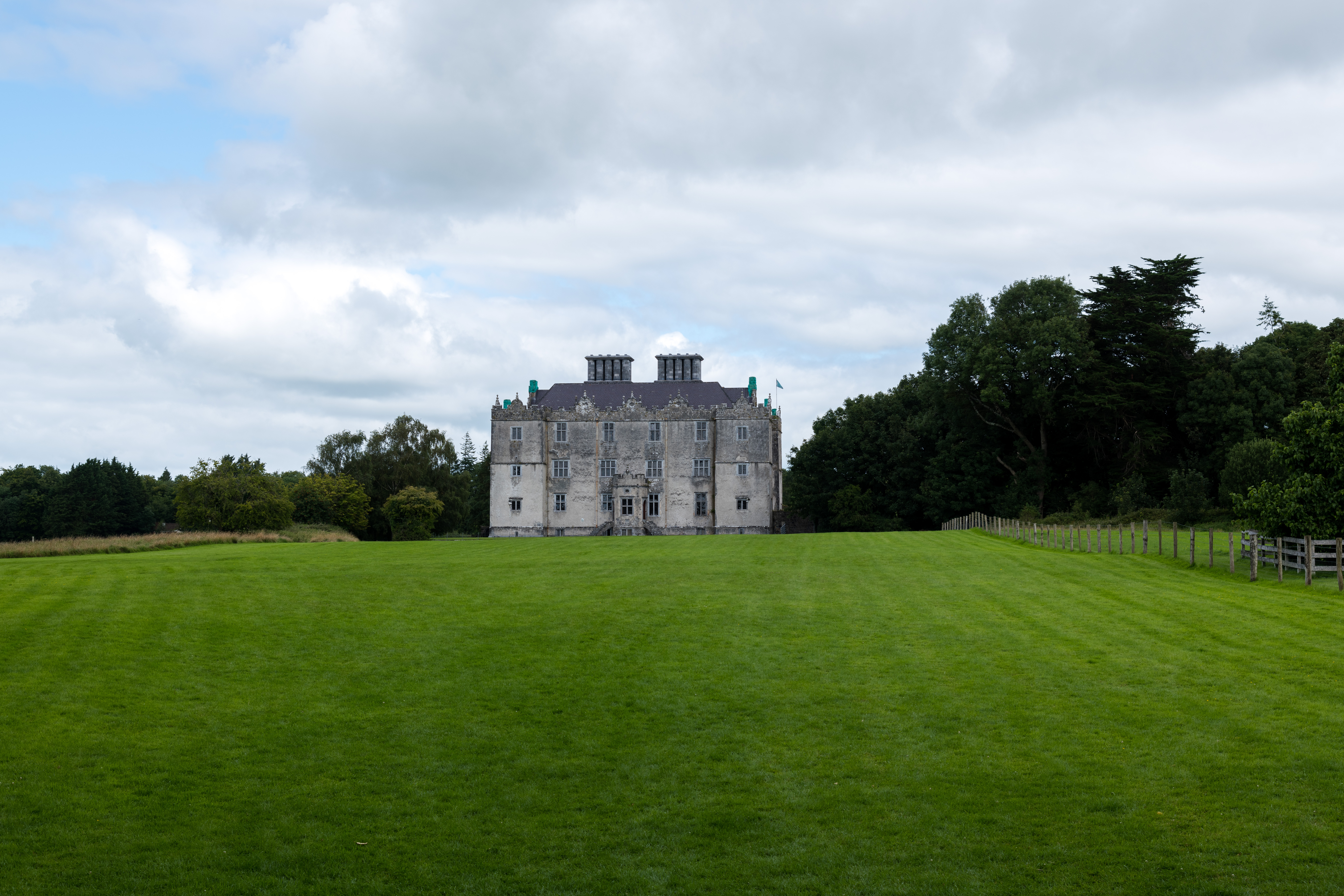
Portumna Castle.

The Honourable John Smith Burke was born to Michael Burke, 10th Earl of Clanricarde and his wife Anne Smith in 1720. He was the couple's fourth and last child, and the heir to the earldom, having two older sisters. An older brother had died in infancy. He succeeded his father on the latter's death in 1726, at the age of six.

== Career ==
Lord Clanricarde was educated at Winchester College. He was elected a Fellow of the Royal Society and a Fellow of the Society of Antiquaries in 1753. He was a Privy Counsellor of Ireland for eight days in 1761, being struck off the list of the council on 16 July. He died on 21 April 1782 at Portumna Castle, County Galway and was buried in the Dominican friary, Athenry.

== Marriage and issue ==
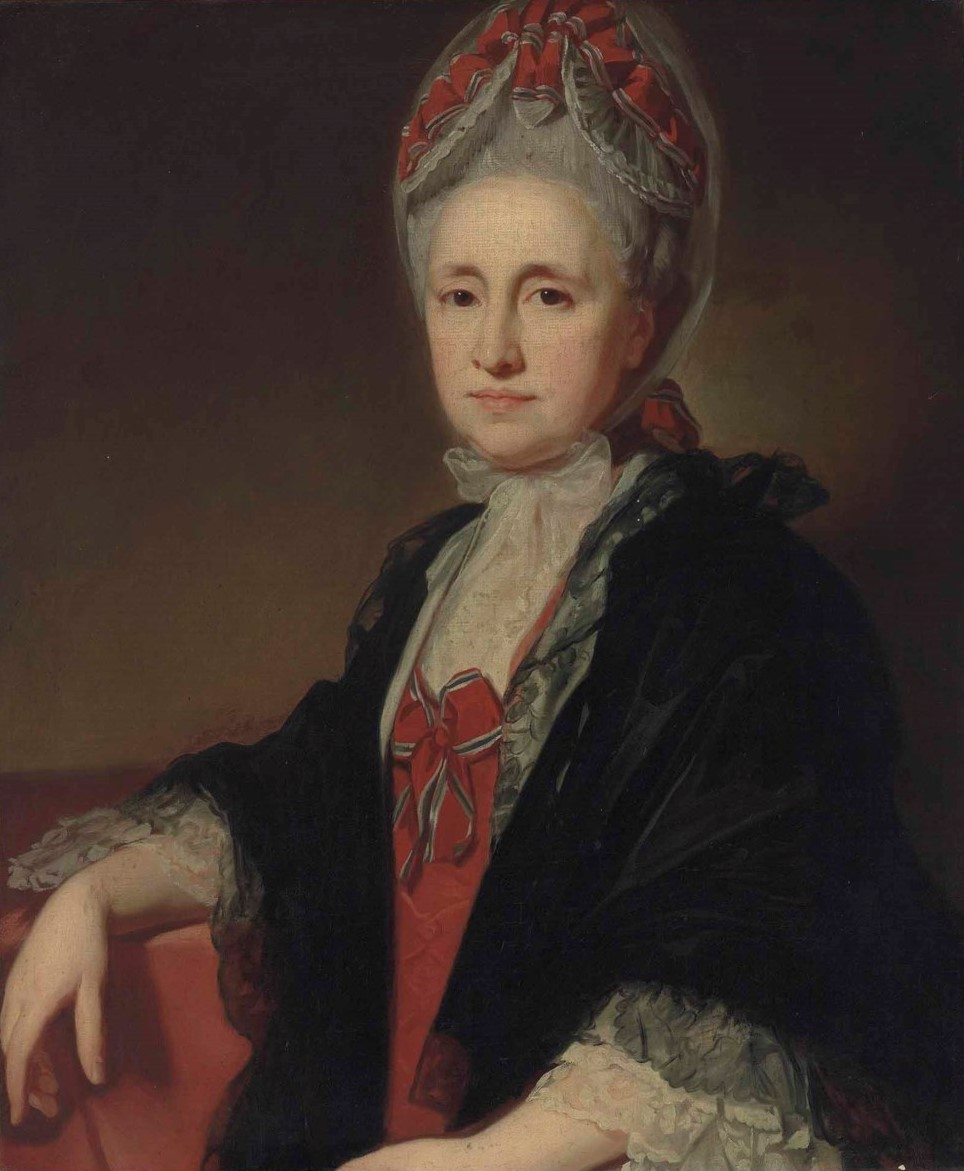
Hester, Countess of Clanricarde, painting by George Romney, 1772.

In 1740, he married Hester Amelia Vincent (d.1804), daughter of Sir Henry Vincent, 6th Baronet of Stoke d'Abernon. By Royal Licence on 13 May 1752, he and his uncles assumed the surname de Burgh which had been the family's surname in previous centuries: de Burgh was gaelicised in Irish as de Búrca which over the centuries became Búrc then Burke.

The couple had four children:

- Lady Hester Amelia de Burgh, who married William Trenchard
- Lady Margaret Augusta de Burgh, wife of Luke Dillon (d.1825) of Hall Place, Warnford, Hampshire. The couple's funeral hatchment survives in the Church of Our Lady, Warnford.
- Henry de Burgh, 1st Marquess of Clanricarde
- General John Thomas de Burgh, 13th Earl of Clanricarde.

== Honours and arms ==
=== Honours ===
Country	Date	Appointment	Ribbon	Post-nominals
United Kingdom	1753	Fellow of the Royal Society		FRS
United Kingdom	1753	Fellow of the Society of Antiquaries		FSA
United Kingdom	1761	Member of the Privy Council of Ireland		PC (Ire)

=== Arms ===
Coat of arms of John Smith de Burgh, 11th Earl of Clanricarde
Crest A Cat-a-Mountain sejant guardant proper, collared and chained Or. Escutcheon Or, a cross gules in the first quarter a lion rampant sable. Supporters Two Cats-a-Mountain sejant guardant proper, collared and chained Or. Motto UNG ROY, UNG FOY, UNG LOY (One king, one faith, one law)

== Ancestry ==
Ancestors of John Smith de Burgh, 11th Earl of Clanricarde

8. William Burke, 7th Earl of Clanricarde
4. John Burke, 9th Earl of Clanricarde
9. Lettice Shirley
2. Michael Burke, 10th Earl of Clanricarde
10. James Talbot (Jacobite)
5. Mary Talbot
11. Bridget de Bermingham
1. John Smith de Burgh, 11th Earl of Clanricarde
12. John Smith
6. John Smith
13. Mary Wright
3. Anne Smith
14. Sir Thomas Strickland, 2nd Baronet
7. Anne Strickland
15. Elizabeth Pile

== See also ==
- House of Burgh, an Anglo-Norman and Hiberno-Norman dynasty founded in 1193

Peerage of Ireland
Preceded by Michael Burke	Earl of Clanricarde; 1726–1782	Succeeded by Henry de Burgh
