= Clonbrock Castle =

Tower house in County Galway, Ireland

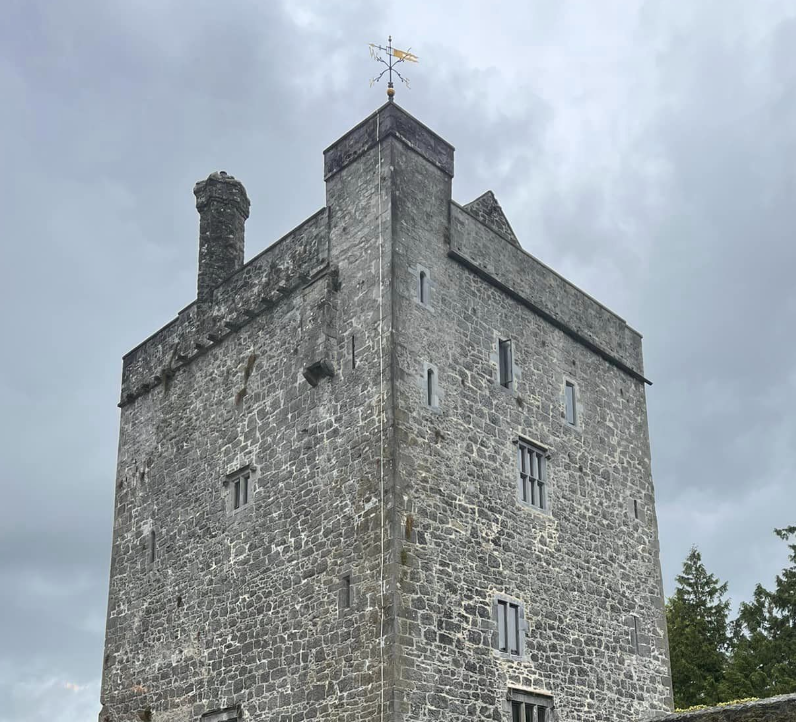
- Clonbrock Castle in 2024

- Location within Ireland
- 53°24′27″N 8°23′6″W
- Type: tower house
- Location: Ahascragh, County Galway, Ireland

History
- Built: 15th century

Site notes
- Owner: O'Kelly family (former); Dillon family (former); Baylis family (former); Paul Boskind (current)

Clonbrock Castle is a 15th-century tower house near Ahascragh in County Galway, Ireland. It was owned by the Dillon family, who were later created Barons Clonbrock.

== History ==
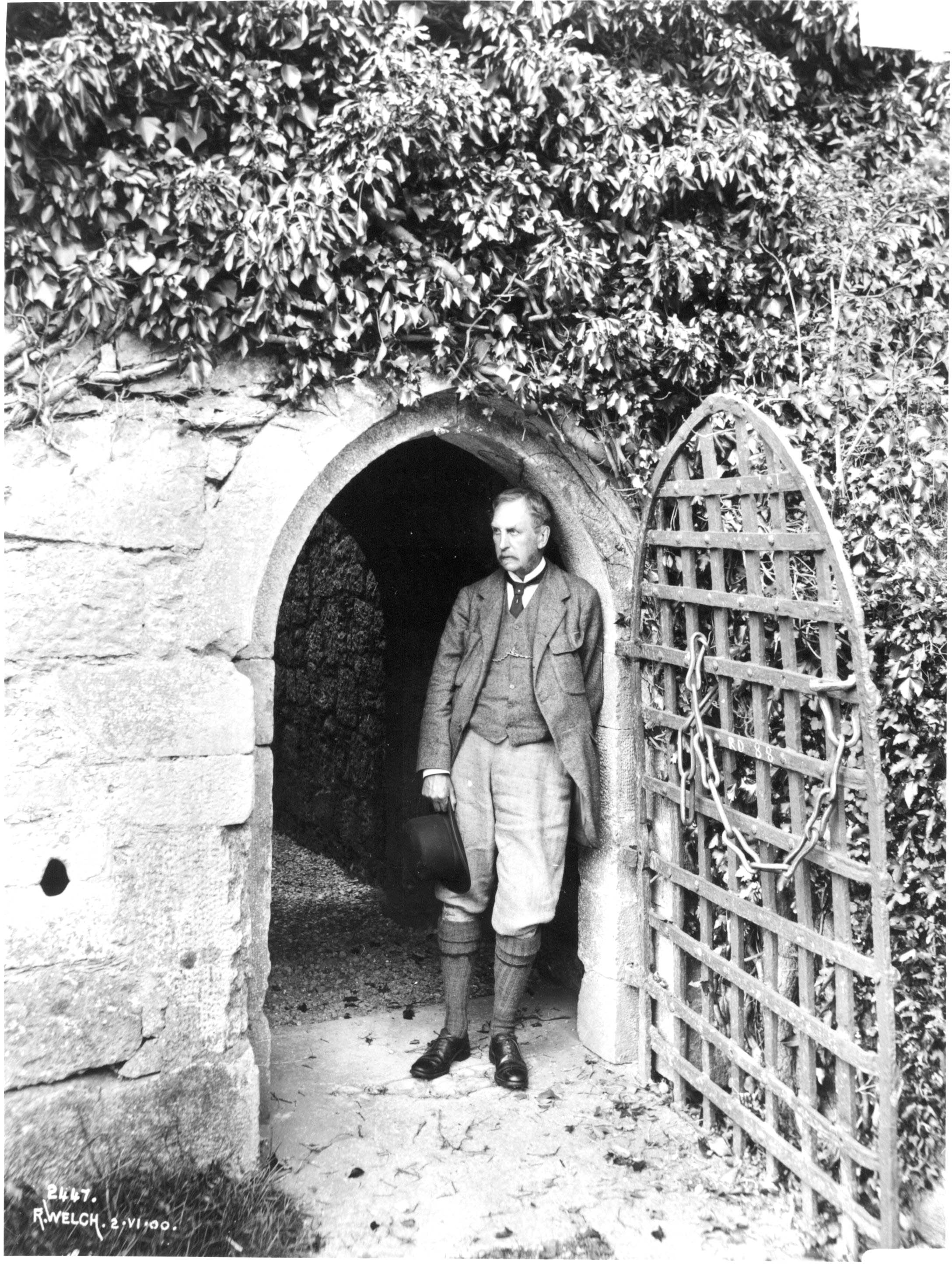
Luke Gerald Dillon, 4th Baron Clonbrock standing at a gate at Clonbrock Castle in 1900

The estate, including the 15th-century tower house, was originally owned by the O'Kelly (Ó Ceallaigh) family until the late 16th century when it was acquired by the Dillon family. Clonbrock's country house, now in ruin, was built in the 1780s. The head of the Dillon family, Robert Dillon, was elevated to the Peerage of Ireland as Baron Clonbrock by George III in 1790. By 1824 the then Lord Clonbrock, Luke Dillon 2nd Baron Clonbrock, was listed as a resident proprietor in County Galway. At the time of Griffith's Valuation (1848–1864), the then Lord Clonbrock was one of the principal lessors in the parishes of Ahascragh, Fohanagh, Killalaghtan and Killosolan in the barony of Kilconnell and Killoran in the barony of Longford. In the 1870s, the Clonbrock estate amounted to over 110 square kilometres (27,000 acres). The lands, house and demesne at Cahir, barony of Clonmacnowen, owned by James Dillon, were offered for sale in the Encumbered Estates Court in July 1854. In 1906, Lord Clonbrock held over 8.1 square kilometres (2,000 acres) of untenanted land and the mansion house at Clonbrock. Sold by the Dillon family in the 1970s, the house was severely damaged by fire in 1986.

In 2004, the castle was purchased by Jonathan and Beverly Baylis, who operated it as an Airbnb. In February 2018, Clonbrock Castle was purchased by Paul Boskind, an American psychologist, business executive, LGBTQ activist, and producer.
