= Michael Burke, 10th Earl of Clanricarde =

Irish noble (1686–1736)

The Right Honourable The Earl of Clanricarde PC (Ire)
- Mícheál de Búrca

Governor and Custos Rotulorum of County Galway
- In office 1712–1714
- Preceded by: John Eyre
- Succeeded by: John Ussher

Member of the Irish House of Lords
- Hereditary Peerage; 1722 – 28 November 1726
- Preceded by: John Burke
- Succeeded by: John Smith de Burgh

Personal details
- Born: Michael Burke; 1686
- Died: 1726 (aged 39–40)
- Spouse: Anne Smith (m. 1714–1726)
- Children: John Smith de Burgh; Lady Anne de Burgh; Lady Mary Bourke; Hon. John Bourke
- Parents: John Burke, 9th Earl of Clanricarde; Mary Talbot
- Education: Eton College; Christ Church, Oxford

Michael Burke, 10th Earl of Clanricarde PC (Ire.) (English: /klænˈrɪkɑːrd/ klan-RIK-ard; 1686–28 November 1726), styled Lord Dunkellin (/dʌnˈkɛlɪn/ dun-KEL-in) until 1722, was an Irish peer who was Governor of Galway (1712–14) and a Privy Counsellor in Ireland (1726).

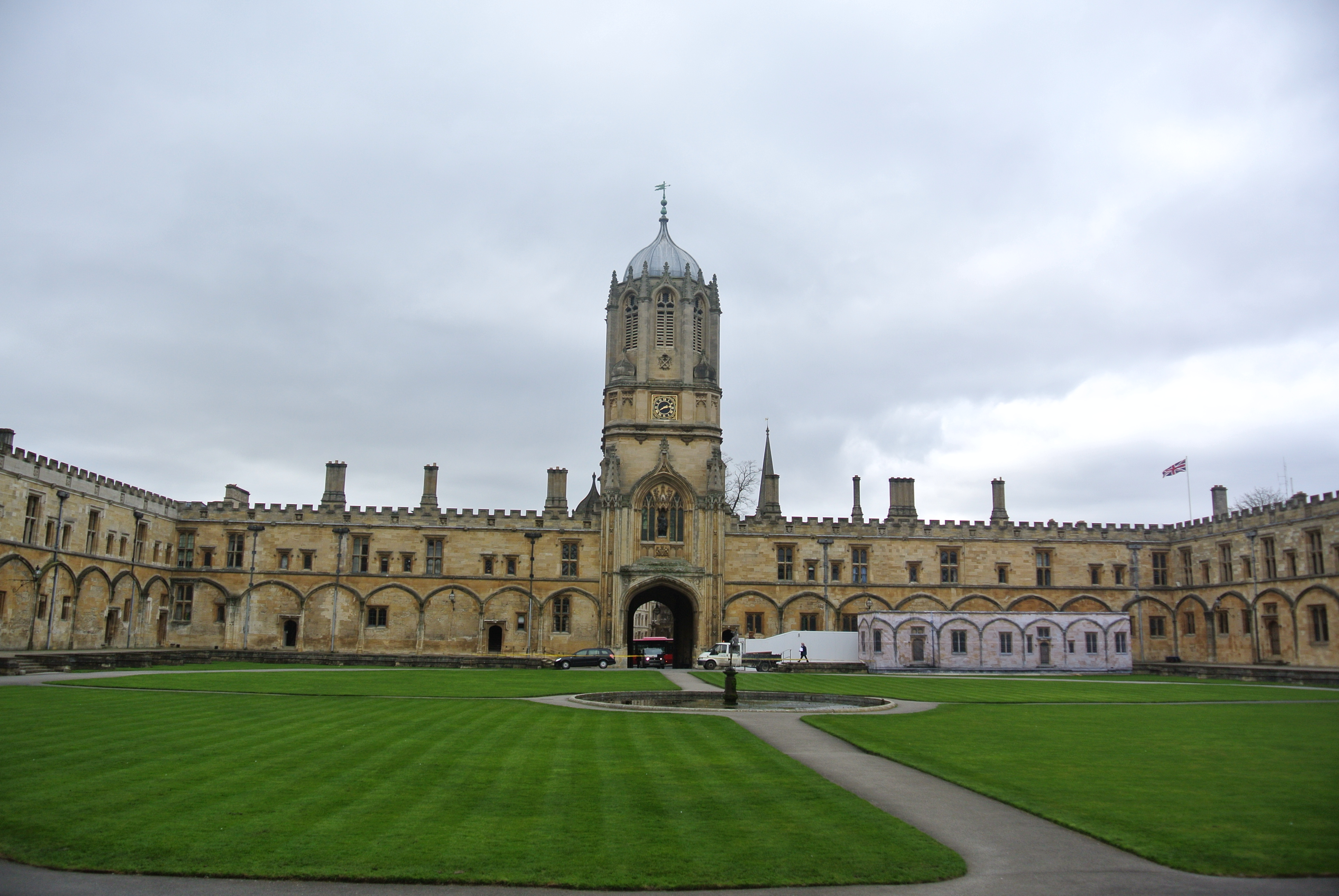
Christ Church, Oxford

== Career ==
Burke was the son of John Burke, 9th Earl of Clanricarde and educated at Eton College and Christ Church, Oxford. He was summoned to the Irish House of Lords to sit, during his father's lifetime, under the subsidiary and courtesy title of Lord Dunkellin. He was appointed Governor of Galway in 1712 and invested as a Privy Counsellor in Ireland on 15 July 1726. On his death, on 28 November 1726, he was buried in Christchurch, Dublin.

== Family ==
He married, on 19 September 1714, to Anne Smith (d.1743), daughter of the House of Commons Speaker John Smith and the widow of Hugh Parker of Honington, warwickshire, who after her death in 1732 was buried in the nave of Westminster Abbey. They had 2 sons and 2 daughters:

- John Smith de Burgh, 11th Earl of Clanricarde
- Lady Anne de Burgh (died 1794) who married Denis Daly
- Lady Mary Bourke who married George Jennings
- Hon. John Bourke (died 1719)

== Honours and Arms ==
=== Honours ===
Country	Date	Appointment	Ribbon	Post-nominals
Kingdom of Ireland	1726	Member of the Privy Council of Ireland		PC (Ire)

=== Arms ===
Coat of arms of Michael Burke, 10th Earl of Clanricarde
Crest A Cat-a-Mountain sejant guardant proper, collared and chained Or. Escutcheon Or, a cross gules in the first quarter a lion rampant sable. Supporters Two Cats-a-Mountain sejant guardant proper, collared and chained Or. Motto UNG ROY, UNG FOY, UNG LOY (Middle French: One king, one faith, one law)

== Ancestry ==
Ancestors of Michael Burke, 10th Earl of Clanricarde

8. Sir William Burke
4. William Burke, 7th Earl of Clanricarde
9. Joan O'Shaughnessy
2. John Burke, 9th Earl of Clanricarde
10. Henry Shirley, 2nd Baronet
5. Lettice Shirley
11. Lady Dorothy Devereux
1. Michael Burke, 10th Earl of Clanricarde
12. Sir Henry Talbot
6. James Talbot
13. Margaret Talbot
3. Mary Talbot
14. Francis de Bermingham, 12th Baron Athenry
7. Bridget de Bermingham
15. Bridget Dillon

== See also ==
- House of Burgh, an Anglo-Norman and Hiberno-Norman dynasty founded in 1193

Honorary titles
Preceded by John Eyre	Governor and Custos Rotulorum of County Galway; 1712–1714	Succeeded by John Ussher
Peerage of Ireland
Preceded by John Burke	Earl of Clanricarde; 1722–1726	Succeeded by John Smith de Burgh
