= William Óg de Burgh =

Irish noble and soldier (d.1270)

Sir William Óg de Burgh
- Native name: Uilleag Óg de Búrca
- Born: Galway, Ireland
- Died: 1270
- Noble family: House of Burgh
- Issue: Sir William Liath de Burgh (d.1324)
- Father: Richard Mor de Burgh, Lord of Connaught
- Mother: Egidia de Lacy

Sir William Óg de Burgh (English: /dəˈbɜːr/ də-BUR; died 1270) was an Anglo-Irish noble and soldier who was the ancestor of the Earls of Clanricarde and the Mac William Iochtar (Burkes of County Mayo).

== Career ==
William Óg was the third son of Richard Mor de Burgh, Lord of Connacht. He served with distinction in France with King Henry III (1245) and later in Scotland. He was involved in fierce feudal warfare in Ireland where he killed the Lord of Desmond. He was killed at the Battle of Áth an Chip or Athankip by the Ua Conchobair Kings of Connacht, in 1270.

== Family ==
He was survived by at least one son, Sir William Liath de Burgh (d.1324), Custos or Warden of Ireland (who married Finola Ní Briain).

William Óg was the ancestor of the Burke (de Burgh) Earls of Clanricarde and the Mac William Iochtar (Burkes of County Mayo).

== Genealogy ==
de Burgh Genealogy
- Walter de Burgh of Burgh Castle, Norfolk m. Alice
  - William de Burgh (d. 1206) m. Daughter of Domnall Mór Ó Briain, King of Thomond
    - Richard Mór / Óge de Burgh, 1st Lord of Connaught m. Egidia de Lacy, Lady of Connacht
      - Sir Richard de Burgh (d.1248), 2nd Lord of Connaught
      - Walter de Burgh, 1st Earl of Ulster (d. 1271)
        - Richard Óg de Burgh, 2nd Earl of Ulster (1259–1326)
          - John de Burgh m. Elizabeth de Clare
            - William Donn de Burgh, 3rd Earl of Ulster (1312–33) m. Maud of Lancaster
              - Elizabeth de Burgh, 4th Countess of Ulster (1332–63) m. Lionel of Antwerp, 1st Duke of Clarence
                - Philippa Plantagenet, 5th Countess of Ulster (1355–82) m. Edmund Mortimer, 3rd Earl of March
                - Roger Mortimer, 4th Earl of March, 6th Earl of Ulster (1374–98)
                  - Edmund Mortimer, 5th Earl of March, 7th Earl of Ulster (1391–1425)
                  - Anne Mortimer (1388–1411) m. Richard of Conisburgh, 3rd Earl of Cambridge
                    - Richard of York, 3rd Duke of York, 8th Earl of Ulster (1411–60)
                      - Edward IV (Edward, 4th Duke of York, 9th Earl of Ulster)
                        - House of York (Kings and Queens of England and Ireland)
          - Edmond de Burgh
            - Sir Richard Burke
              - Walter Burke (d. 1432)
                - Burkes of Castleconnell and Brittas (Clanwilliam)
              - Uileag Carragh Burke
                - Burkes of Cois tSiúire (Clanwilliam)
            - Sir David Burke,
              - Burkes of Muskerryquirk (Clanwilliam)
          - Elizabeth, Queen of Scotland m. Robert I of Scotland
        - Theobald de Burgh
        - William de Burgh
        - Thomas de Burgh
        - Egidia de Burgh
      - William Óg de Burgh (d. 1270)
        - William Liath de Burgh (d. 1324)
          - Sir Walter Liath de Burgh, d. 1332
          - Sir Edmond Albanach de Burgh (d. 1375), 1st Mac William Íochtar (Lower Mac William), (Mayo)
            - Mac William Íochtars, Viscounts Mayo and Earls of Mayo
          - John de Burgh (1350–98), Chancellor of the University of Cambridge
          - Richard an Fhorbhair de Burgh
            - Sir Ulick de Burgh (d. 1343/53), 1st Mac William Uachtar (Upper Mac William) or Clanricarde (Galway)
              - Richard Óg Burke (d. 1387)
                - Ulick an Fhiona Burke
                  - Clanricardes, Earls of Marquesses of Clanricarde
            - Raymond de Burgh
            - Walter Óge de Burgh
          - Raymund de Burgh
          - Ulick de Burgh of Umhall
      - Alice de Burgh
      - Margery de Burgh
      - Matilda de Burgh
      - Daughter de Burgh
    - Hubert de Burgh, Bishop of Limerick (d. 1250)
    - William de Burgh, Sheriff of Connacht
  - Hubert de Burgh, 1st Earl of Kent (d. 1243) m.
    - John de Burgh
    - Hubert de Burgh
    - Hubert de Burgh
      - Barons Burgh
  - Geoffrey de Burgh, Bishop of Ely (d. 1228)
  - Thomas de Burgh

== See also ==
- House of Burgh, an Anglo-Norman and Hiberno-Norman dynasty founded in 1193
- Lord of Connaught
- Earl of Ulster
- Clanricarde
- Mac William Iochtar
