= Burke Civil War =

1330s war in Ireland

| Date | 1333 – 1338 (5 years) |
| Location | England, Ireland |
| Result | Loss of almost all de Burgh lands of Ulster; and division of the family into 3 clans. |

Belligerents
| William Donn de Burgh, 3rd Earl of Ulster | Edmond de Burgh of Castleconnell | Edmond Albanach de Burgh | Uilleag de Burgh |

The Burke/de Burgh Civil War was a conflict in Ireland from 1333 to 1338 between three leading members of the de Burgh (Burke/Bourke) Anglo-Norman family resulting in the division into three clans.

== Background ==
Twenty-year-old William Donn de Burgh, 3rd Earl of Ulster, known as "the Brown Earl", was murdered by his household knights in June 1333 after he had starved to death his cousin and rival Sir Walter Liath de Burgh in the previous year (1332). The Earl's only child, Elizabeth de Burgh (1332–1363), succeeded as Countess of Ulster and legal heir to the de Burgh estates as an infant. For safety, as an infant and a female heiress, she was taken by her mother to England as her lordships collapsed in a power struggle.

Three members of the de Burgh family fought against each other in an attempt to preserve their own personal estates, and hold overall control of the massive de Burgh inheritance in Ireland. They were:

- Sir Edmond de Burgh of Castleconnell (only surviving uncle of the Brown Earl, and senior member of the de Burgh dynasty) who drowned in Lough Mask in 1338.
- Sir Edmond Albanach de Burgh of north Connacht (cousin of the Brown Earl, brother of the Walter Liath de Burgh who died in 1332)
- Sir Uilleag de Burgh of south Connacht (chief of the Burkes of Galway)

== Loss and divisions ==
The eventual outcome of the war was the loss of almost all the de Burgh lands in Ulster, which was reconquered within a year by the Gaelic-Irish.

The remaining de Burghs in Ireland fragmented into three distinct clans, all of which had several sub-septs. They were:

- Clan William Bourke of County Limerick
- Mac William Íochtar (Bourke) of County Mayo
- Mac William Uachtar or Clanricarde (Burke / de Burgh) of County Galway

== Clan William, Mac William, Clanricarde ==
de Burgh Genealogy
- Walter de Burgh of Burgh Castle, Norfolk m. Alice
  - William de Burgh (d. 1206) m. Daughter of Domnall Mór Ó Briain, King of Thomond
    - Richard Mór / Óge de Burgh, 1st Lord of Connaught m. Egidia de Lacy, Lady of Connacht
      - Sir Richard de Burgh (d.1248), 2nd Lord of Connaught
      - Walter de Burgh, 1st Earl of Ulster (d. 1271)
        - Richard Óg de Burgh, 2nd Earl of Ulster (1259–1326)
          - John de Burgh m. Elizabeth de Clare
            - William Donn de Burgh, 3rd Earl of Ulster (1312–33) m. Maud of Lancaster
              - Elizabeth de Burgh, 4th Countess of Ulster (1332–63) m. Lionel of Antwerp, 1st Duke of Clarence
                - Philippa Plantagenet, 5th Countess of Ulster (1355–82) m. Edmund Mortimer, 3rd Earl of March
                - Roger Mortimer, 4th Earl of March, 6th Earl of Ulster (1374–98)
                  - Edmund Mortimer, 5th Earl of March, 7th Earl of Ulster (1391–1425)
                  - Anne Mortimer (1388–1411) m. Richard of Conisburgh, 3rd Earl of Cambridge
                    - Richard of York, 3rd Duke of York, 8th Earl of Ulster (1411–60)
                      - Edward IV (Edward, 4th Duke of York, 9th Earl of Ulster)
                        - House of York (Kings and Queens of England and Ireland)
          - Edmond de Burgh
            - Sir Richard Burke
              - Walter Burke (d. 1432)
                - Burkes of Castleconnell and Brittas (Clanwilliam)
              - Uileag Carragh Burke
                - Burkes of Cois tSiúire (Clanwilliam)
            - Sir David Burke,
              - Burkes of Muskerryquirk (Clanwilliam)
          - Elizabeth, Queen of Scotland m. Robert I of Scotland
        - Theobald de Burgh
        - William de Burgh
        - Thomas de Burgh
        - Egidia de Burgh
      - William Óg de Burgh (d. 1270)
        - William Liath de Burgh (d. 1324)
          - Sir Walter Liath de Burgh, d. 1332
          - Sir Edmond Albanach de Burgh (d. 1375), 1st Mac William Íochtar (Lower Mac William), (Mayo)
            - Mac William Íochtars, Viscounts Mayo and Earls of Mayo
          - John de Burgh (1350–98), Chancellor of the University of Cambridge
          - Richard an Fhorbhair de Burgh
            - Sir Ulick de Burgh (d. 1343/53), 1st Mac William Uachtar (Upper Mac William) or Clanricarde (Galway)
              - Richard Óg Burke (d. 1387)
                - Ulick an Fhiona Burke
                  - Clanricardes, Earls of Marquesses of Clanricarde
            - Raymond de Burgh
            - Walter Óge de Burgh
          - Raymund de Burgh
          - Ulick de Burgh of Umhall
      - Alice de Burgh
      - Margery de Burgh
      - Matilda de Burgh
      - Daughter de Burgh
    - Hubert de Burgh, Bishop of Limerick (d. 1250)
    - William de Burgh, Sheriff of Connacht
  - Hubert de Burgh, 1st Earl of Kent (d. 1243) m.
    - John de Burgh
    - Hubert de Burgh
    - Hubert de Burgh
      - Barons Burgh
  - Geoffrey de Burgh, Bishop of Ely (d. 1228)
  - Thomas de Burgh

== See also ==
- House of Burgh
- Clanricarde
- Mac William Íochtar
