= De Burgo baronets =

Title in the Baronetage of Ireland

de Burgo Baronetcy Barúntacht de Búrca
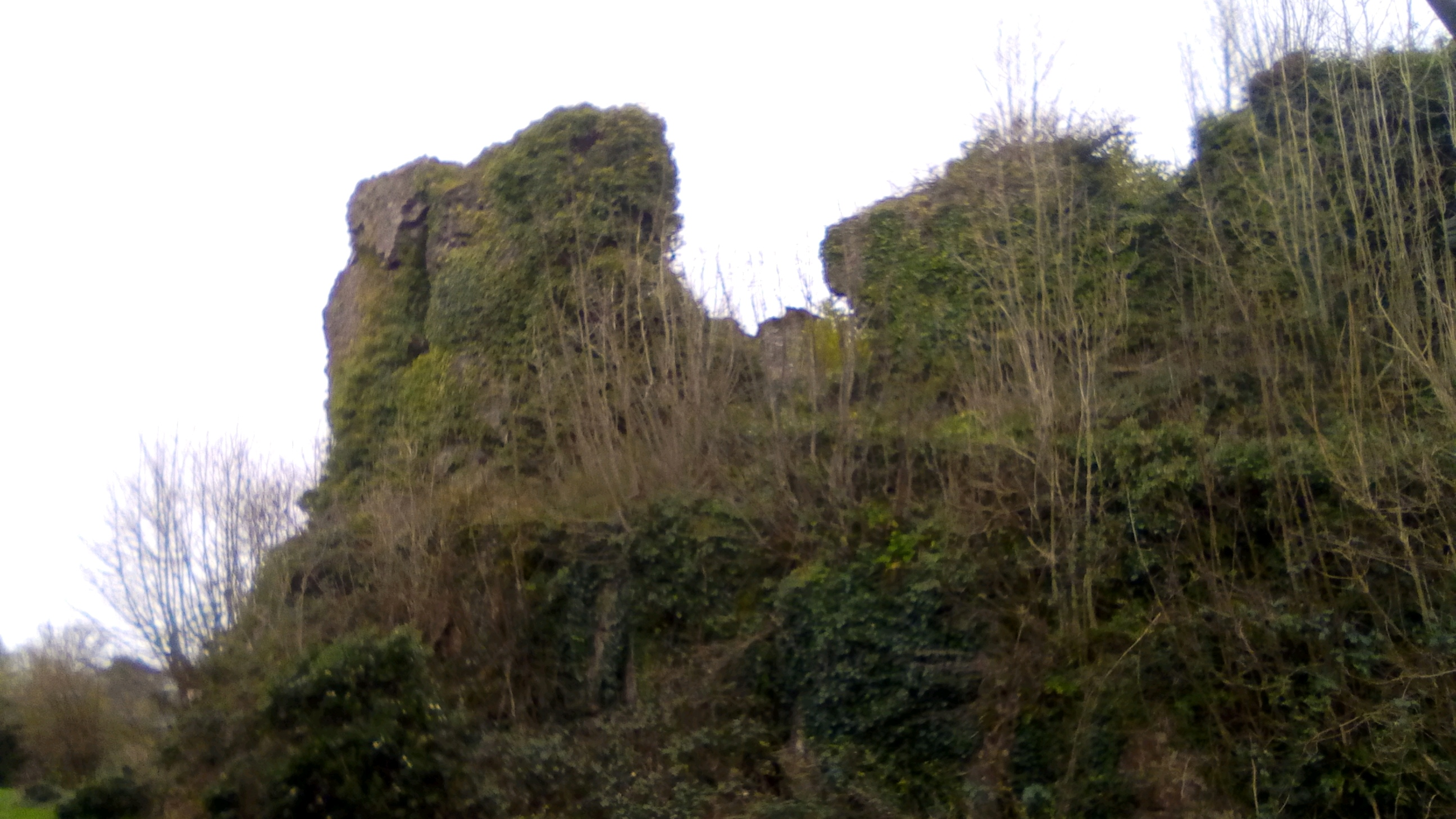
- Ruins of Castle Connell, County Limerick, March 2020
- Creation date: 16 June 1785
- Created by: George III
- Baronetage: Baronetage of Ireland
- First holder: Sir Richard de Burgo, 1st Baronet
- Last holder: Sir Richard Donellan de Burgo, 4th Baronet
- Status: Extinct
- Extinction date: 1873
- Seat: Castle Connell

The de Burgo Baronetcy (Latin: de Burgo; Irish: de Búrca; English: de Burgh), of Castle Connell in the County of Limerick, was a title in the Baronetage of Ireland created on 16 June 1785 for Richard de Burgo. The first Baronet was born Richard Burke, but later assumed the surname of de Burgo (the Latin spelling of the family surname). The title became extinct on the death of the fourth Baronet in 1873. The de Burgo family were believed to be a branch of the Burke (or de Burgh) family headed by the Earl of Clanricarde.

== de Burgo baronets, of Castle Conel (1785) ==
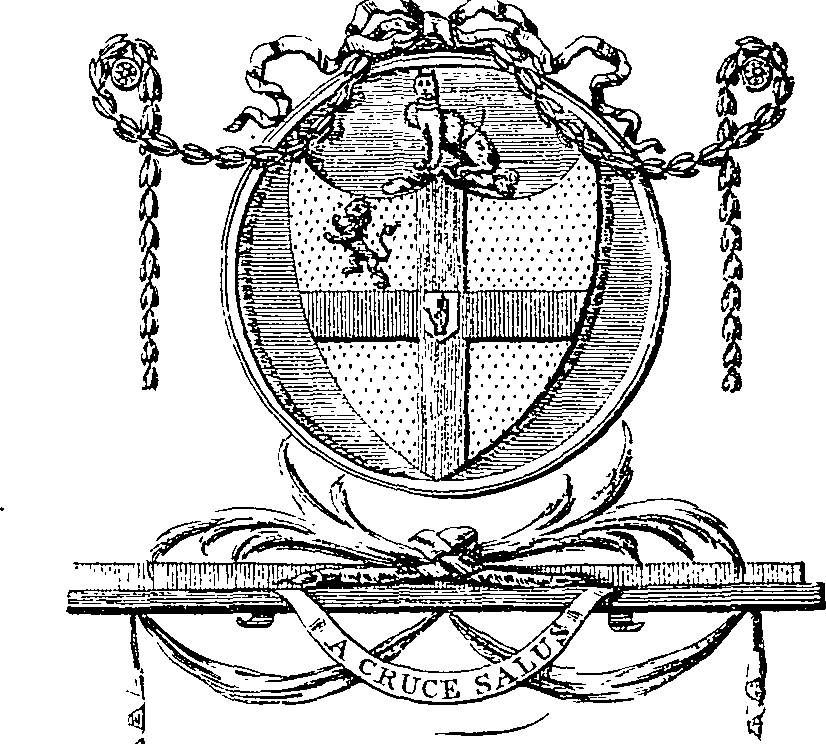
The De Burgo crest, ca 1787.

- Sir Richard de Burgo, 1st Baronet (died 1790)
- Sir Richard de Burgo, 2nd Baronet (c. 1783–c. 1808)
- Sir John Allan de Burgo, 3rd Baronet (died 1839)
- Sir Richard Donellan de Burgo, 4th Baronet (1821–1873)

== See also ==
- Irish nobility
- House of Burgh, an Anglo-Norman and Hiberno-Norman dynasty founded in 1193
- The Book of the Burkes or Book of the de Burgos (1580s), Gaelic illuminated manuscript at Trinity College Dublin
- William de Burgh, founder of the House of Burgh
- Richard Mór de Burgh, first lord of Connacht
- Viscount Galway, viscountcy created in the Peerage of Ireland in 1628 and 1687
- Baron Leitrim, barony created in the Peerage of Ireland
- Burke Baronets of Glinsk and Marble Hill, Galway, created in the Baronetage of Ireland in 1628 and 1797
- Mac William Uachtar/Clanricarde, the Burke clan of Galway
- Mac William Íochtar, the Bourke clan of Mayo
- Edmund Burke (1729–1797), Irish statesman, economist, and philosopher
- de Burgh (surname), list of people with this surname
- Burke (surname), list of people with this surname
- Bourke (surname), list of people with this surname
