= William Liath de Burgh =

Justiciar of Ireland

- Native name: Uilliam Liath de Búrca
- Born: Galway, Ireland
- Died: 1324
- Noble family: House of Burgh
- Spouse: Finola Ní Briain
- Issue: Sir Edmond Albanach de Burgh; John Burgh (1350–1398); Sir Ulick de Burgh; Sir Walter Liath de Burgh
- Father: William Og de Burgh

Sir William Liath de Burgh (English: /dəˈbɜːr/ də-BUR; died 1324) was an Irish noble and Justiciar of Ireland (1308–09). He was an ancestor of the Mac William Uachtar and Mac William Íochtar who were later earls of Clanricarde and Mayo respectively.

== Background ==
De Burgh was a son of William Og de Burgh, who was killed at the Battle of Áth-an-Chip or Athankip in 1270, and a nephew of Walter de Burgh, 1st Earl of Ulster (died 1271). He was nicknamed liath, Gaelic for grey, though the reasons are unknown.

== Career ==
De Burgh spent much of his life fighting on behalf of his cousin, the 2nd Earl of Ulster, first coming to notice in 1290 when he was defeated in a skirmish with Mac Coughlan.

He was Justiciar of Ireland from 1 October 1308, relinquishing office on 15 May 1309.

== The Bruce Invasion of Ireland ==
He was captured at the Battle of Connor in Ulster in 1315, when an army led by his cousin the Earl of Ulster was defeated by an Irish-Scots army led by Edward Bruce. He was sent to Scotland. His release was only obtained by the Earl in the summer of 1316 in exchange for his son, Edmund, as hostage.

== Athenry ==
Returning from Scotland he was in Connacht by July 1316 and assembled "a motley army of Anglo-Norman colonists and Irish chieftains who had remained loyal to the earl and marched against Fedlimid O'Connor, who had taken advantage of the chaos to lay waste to the province. On 10 August, after a particularly bloody battle at Athenry, William was victorious".

== Family ==
He had married Finnguala ("Finola") Ní Bhriain, daughter of Brian Ruad, King of Thomond, by whom he had three sons:

- Sir Edmond Albanach de Burgh (died 1375)
- John Burgh, (1350–1398) Chancellor of the University of Cambridge
- Sir Ulick de Burgh (died 1352)
- Sir Walter Liath de Burgh, died February 1332

He may also have had other children- legitimate or illegitimate:

- Raymond, ancestor of the Mac Raymond Burkes of Muinter Murchadha
- Richard, ancestor of the Clan Henry, Mac Walter of Lackagh, Mac William Duinn, Mac Tibbot and Mac Meyler
- Theobald, died 1336
- Thomas
- Gylle de Burgh (fl. 1332)
- Mor, married Ruaidhri O Cellaigh who died 1339
- Two unnamed sons, killed in Leinster in 1311

== Summation ==
Ronan Mackay summed him up as a loyal and capable lieutenant of the Earl. "From 1305 onwards he was lord of connacht in all but name, allowing Richard to concentrate on the rest of his sprawling domains. The fact that Connacht did not collapse during the Bruce invasion was primarily due to William's ability and his strong ties to many of the leading Irish families of the province. Ironically his success in building a local power base there was to lead to conflict between his heirs and the next earl of Ulster.

He died in 1323 and was interred in the Dominican priory at Athenry. He is the ancestor of the Bourkes of County Mayo.

== Annals of the Four Masters ==
From the Annals of the Four Masters:

- M1322.11. William Liath Burke, son of William More, died.
- M1324.3. William Burke, son of William More, died.

== Genealogy ==
  Walter de Burgh
  |
  |____________________________________________
  |                                           |
  |                                           |
 William de Burgh, died 1205.    Hubert de Burgh, 1st Earl of Kent, d. 1243.
  |                                        (issue; John and Hubert)
  |_________________________________________________________________________________________________________
  |                                                         |                                             |
  |                                                         |                                             |
 Richard Mór de Burgh, 1st Baron of Connaught Hubert de Burgh, Bishop of Limerick, d. 1250.   Richard Óge de Burgh
  |                                                                                                       |
  |                                           ____________________________________________________________|
 de Burgh Earl of Ulster,                     |                  |               |
 Burke of Castleconnell, County Limerick      |                  |               |
 Mac William Iochtar Bourke of County Mayo.  Hubert William Richard
                                              |                  |               |
                                              |                  |               |_________________
                                     Clan Mac Hubert?   Richard an Fhorbhair     |                |
                                                                 |               |                |
  _______________________________________________________________|               Sir David Donn Sir William Ruad
  |                                           |         |                            |                    d.1327.
  |                                           |         |                   Clan Mac David
  Ulick Burke of Annaghkeen, d. 1343.      Raymond Walter Óge
  |
  |
  Richard Óg Burke, d. 1387.
  |
  |
  Burke of Clanricarde

== See also ==
- House of Burgh, an Anglo-Norman and Hiberno-Norman dynasty founded in 1193
- Burke Civil War
- Mac William Uachtar (Clanricarde)
- Mac William Íochtar
