= Lord of Connaught =

Irish lordship

Lord of Connaught (Irish: Tighearna Connacht) was a title used by several Norman barons in Ireland. Granted to William de Burgh, the lordship was claimed by his son, Richard Mor de Burgh, and his descendants.

== Conquest ==
During the Norman invasion of Ireland, William de Burgh (d.1206) was apparently granted Connacht, but never took possession of it. It remained in the hands of native kings until 1224, when his son, Richard Mor de Burgh, claimed it on the basis of his father's grant. Richard's uncle Hubert de Burgh was then Justiciar of Ireland and upheld the claim in 1227. Richard called upon the feudal levies of Ireland and conquered Connacht (1235), assuming the title Lord of Connaught.

Richard's son Walter de Burgh, 1st Earl of Ulster, his son Richard Óg de Burgh, 2nd Earl of Ulster, and Richard Óg's grandson William Donn de Burgh, 3rd Earl of Ulster all seem to have used the title but, on the death of the latter in 1333, civil war broke out over control of the de Burgh lands.

== Division ==
Connacht was divided between Sir Ulick Burke (1st Mac William Uachtar (Upper Mac William) or Clanricarde, Galway) and Edmond Albanach de Burgh (1st Mac William Íochtar or Lower Mac William, Mayo) and the title fell out of use. It was not recognized in the Peerage of Ireland, and the heirs-general of William Donn, who retained the title Earl of Ulster, did not continue to use it.

== Genealogy ==
de Burgh Genealogy: Lords of Connacht, Earls of Ulster and Earls of Kent

Walter de Burgh of Burgh Castle, Norfolk	Alice
William de Burgh d. 1206	Geoffrey de Burgh d. 1228; Bishop of Ely	Hubert de Burgh d. before 1243; 1st Earl of Kent; Regent of England	Thomas de Burgh; Castellan of Norwich
Richard Mór / Óge de Burgh d. 1242/3; 1st Lord of Connacht	Hubert de Burgh d. 1250; Bishop of Limerick	William de Burgh; Sheriff of Connacht	John de Burgh	Hubert de Burgh
Richard de Burgh d. 1248; Constable of Montgomery Castle	Walter de Burgh d. 1271; 2nd Lord of Connacht; 1st Earl of Ulster	William Óg de Burgh d. 1270	Barons Burgh of Gainsborough; 15th century
Richard Óg de Burgh; 1259–1326; 3rd Lord of Connacht; 2nd Earl of Ulster	de Burgh/Burkes of Mayo (Mac William Íochtar)	de Burgh / Burke of Galway (Mac William Uachtar/ Clanricarde)
Robert I King of Scots	Elizabeth de Burgh c. 1289–1327	John de Burgh; 1286–1313	Edmond de Burgh; 1298–1338
Edward III of England; 1312–1377; King of England	William Donn de Burgh; 1312–1333; 4th Lord of Connacht; 3rd Earl of Ulster	de Burgh / Burke of ClanWilliam
Lionel; Duke of Clarence; 1338–1368	Elizabeth de Burgh; 1332–1363; 5th Baroness of Connaught; 4th Countess of Ulster suo jure
Philippa; 1355–1382; 6th Baroness of Connaught; 5th Countess of Ulster suo jure

== Lords of Connaught ==
- Richard Mór de Burgh, 1st Lord of Connaught
- Walter de Burgh, 2nd Lord of Connaught (1st Earl of Ulster)
- Richard Óg de Burgh, 3rd Lord of Connaught (2nd Earl of Ulster)
- William Donn de Burgh, 4th Lord of Connaught (3rd Earl of Ulster)
- Elizabeth de Burgh, 4th Countess of Ulster

== See also ==
- House of Burgh, an Anglo-Norman and Hiberno-Norman dynasty founded in 1193
