= William de Burgh =

Anglo-Norman Irish noble and founder of the House of Burgh (c.1160–1205/6)

- Uilleag de Búrca
- Blazon: Or, a cross gules (adopted at the start of the age of heraldry, c. 1200–15).
- Born: 1160; Burgh and Tuttington, Norfolk, England
- Died: 1206 (aged 45–46); Galway, Ireland
- Resting place: Augustinian Priory of Athassel, Golden, County Tipperary
- Spouse: Daughter of King Domnall Mór Ua Briain
- Children: Richard, 1st Lord of Connaught; Hubert, Bishop of Limerick; William de Burgh the Younger
- Relatives: Walter de Burgh (father); Hubert, Earl of Kent (brother); Geoffrey, Bishop of Ely (brother); Thomas de Burgh, Castellan of Norwich (brother)

William de Burgh (English: /dəˈbɜːr/ də-BUR, French: [dəbuʁ]; Latin: de Burgo; c. 1160–winter 1205/06) was the founder of the House of Burgh (later surnamed Burke or Bourke) in Ireland and elder brother of Hubert de Burgh, 1st Earl of Kent and Geoffrey de Burgh, Bishop of Ely. William is often given the epithet, "the conqueror", but is not to be confused with the English king of the same nickname.

== In Ireland ==
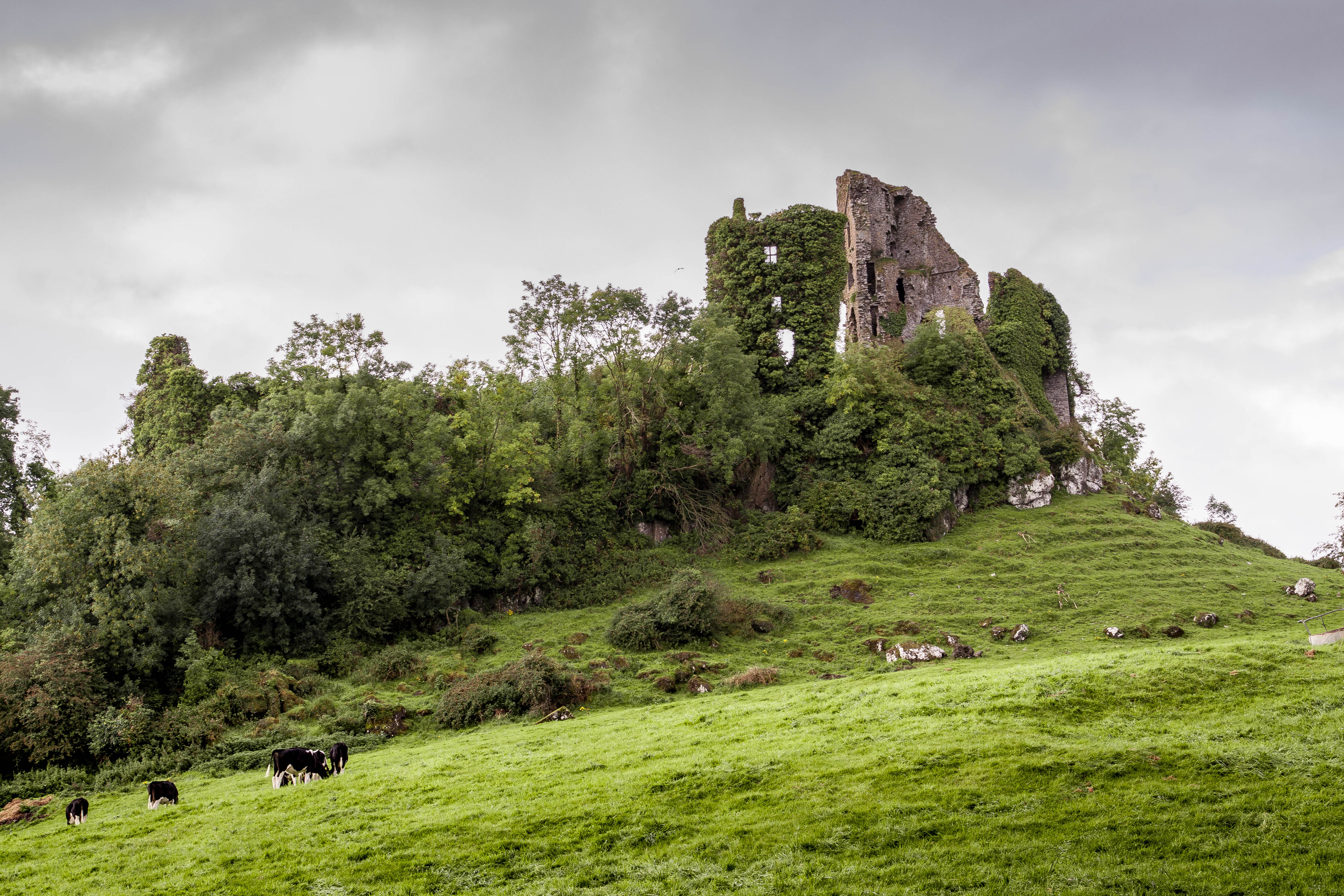
Carrigogunnell Castle, Limerick

William de Burgh born of unknown parents of Burgh-next-Aylsham, Norfolk. A case has been made for William's father being Walter de Burgh, and his mother was named Alice. Ellis has made a case that William's father was Walter de Burgh but notes this is "highly conjectural". The family were minor landholders in Norfolk and Suffolk, from whom Hubert inherited at least four manors, of Burgh-next-Aylsham, Norfolk, and had three brothers: Hubert, Earl of Kent; Geoffrey, Bishop of Ely; and Thomas, Castellan of Norwich.

William was "one of the new wave of Anglo-Normans to come to Ireland with John, lord of Ireland, in 1185" and has been described as "one of the most prominent men involved in the annexation of the kingdom of Limerick in the last quarter of the twelfth century".

Henry II of England appointed him Governor of Limerick and granted him vast estates in Leinster and Munster. William de Burgh's lands were centred along the River Suir from Tibberaghny to Clonmel and around Kilfeakle in Tipperary, and along the River Shannon from Limerick to Lough Derg. His castles at Tibberaghny (County Kilkenny), Kilsheelan, Ardpatrick and Kilfeacle were used to protect King John's northern borders of Waterford and Lismore whilst his castles at Carrigogunnell and Castleconnell were used to protect Limerick. He was granted Tibberaghny Castle in 1200, and was Seneschal (Royal Governor) of Munster from 1201 to 1203.

== Marriage and alliance ==
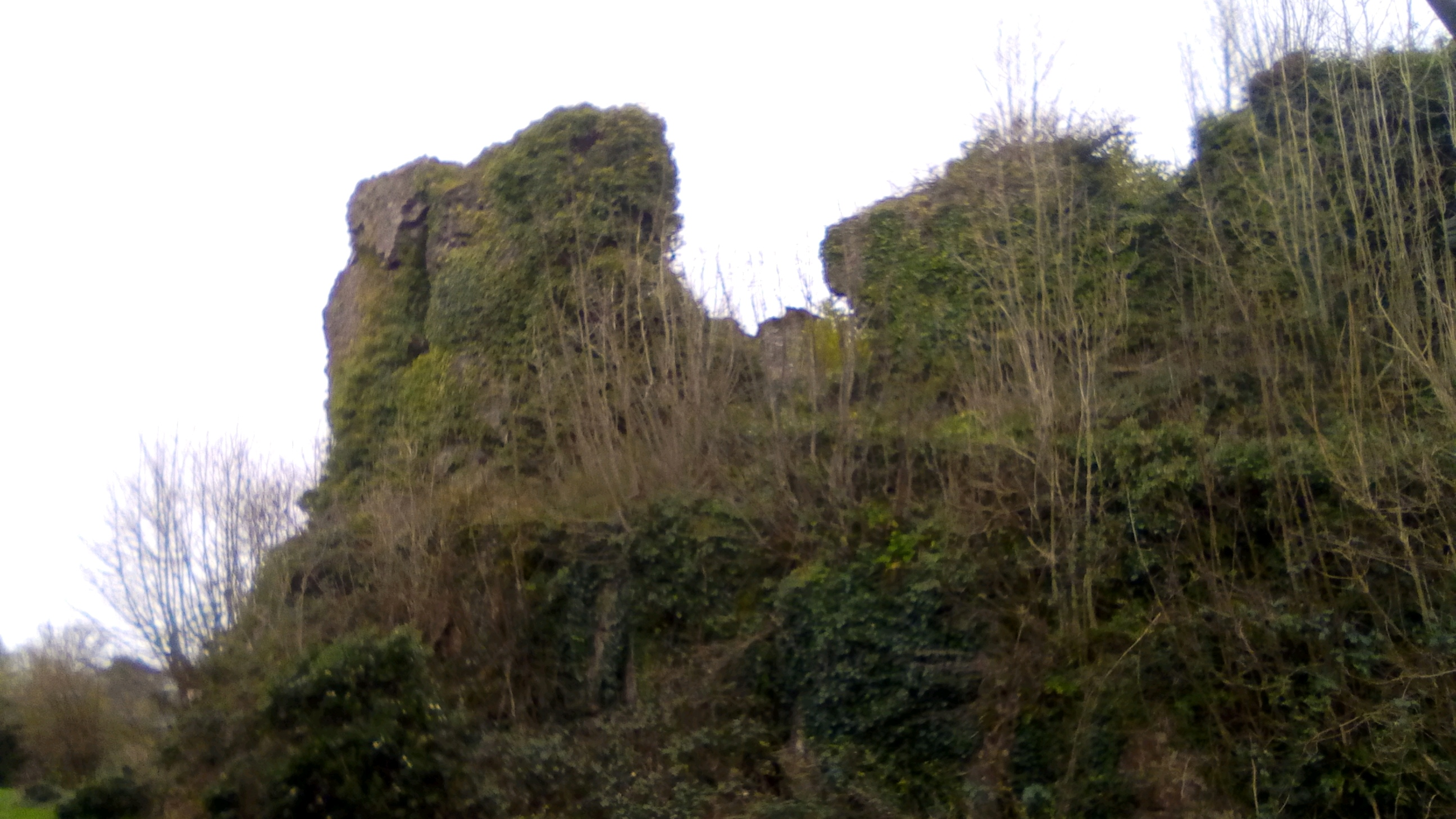
Castle Connell, Limerick

Sometime during the 1190s, William de Burgh allied himself with the King of Thomond (either Domnall Mór Ó Briain (d.1194) or his son, Muirchertach) and, in 1192/3, William married Domnall Mór Ó Briain's daughter. This alliance probably took place during the reign of Muirchertach, since Domnall Mór had been at war with the Normans until his death. At any rate no more wars are recorded between the two sides for the rest of the decade. According to the Annals of Inisfallen, in 1201, William and the sons of Domnall Mór led a major joint military expedition into Desmond, slaying Amlaíb Ua Donnabáin among others.

Between 1199 and 1202, William de Burgh led military campaigns in Desmond (with the aid of the Ó Briain). Success in the west and south allowed de Burgh to conquer the Kingdom of Connacht which, though he had been granted (probably before 1195) by John, he had never occupied. The King of Connacht, Cathal Crobhdearg Ua Conchobair (O'Connor), fought a successful counter-attack against Anglo-Norman castles in Munster (including de Burgh's castle of Castleconnell). Further fighting led to the loss of three castles and property, all of which was eventually retrieved (with the exception of much of Connacht).

== Connacht ==
In 1200, "Cathal Crobhdearg Ua Conchobair went into Munster, to the son of Mac Carthy and William de Burgh to solicit their aid." This marked the start of William de Burgh's interest in the province. Cathal Crobhdearg Ua Conchobair (King of Connacht, 1190–1224) faced much opposition (mainly from within his own family) and wished to engage de Burgh's aid to further secure his position. In 1201, William and Ua Conchobair led an army from Limerick to Tuam and finally to Boyle. Ua Conchobair's rival, Cathal Carragh Ua Conchobair, marched at the head of his army but was killed in a de Burgh/Ua Conchobair onslaught after a week of skirmishing between the two sides.

William and Ua Conchobair then travelled to Iar Connacht and stayed at Cong for Easter. Here, William de Burgh (and the sons of Rory O'Flaherty) conspired to kill Ua Conchobair but the plot was foiled (apparently by holy oaths they were made to swear by the local Coarb family). However, when de Burgh demanded payment for himself and his retinue, a battle broke out with over seven hundred of de Burgh's followers said to have been killed. William, however, managed to return to Limerick. In the following year, 1202, William returned and took revenge for the destruction of his army a year earlier. He took the title "Lord of Connacht" in 1203.

== Death ==
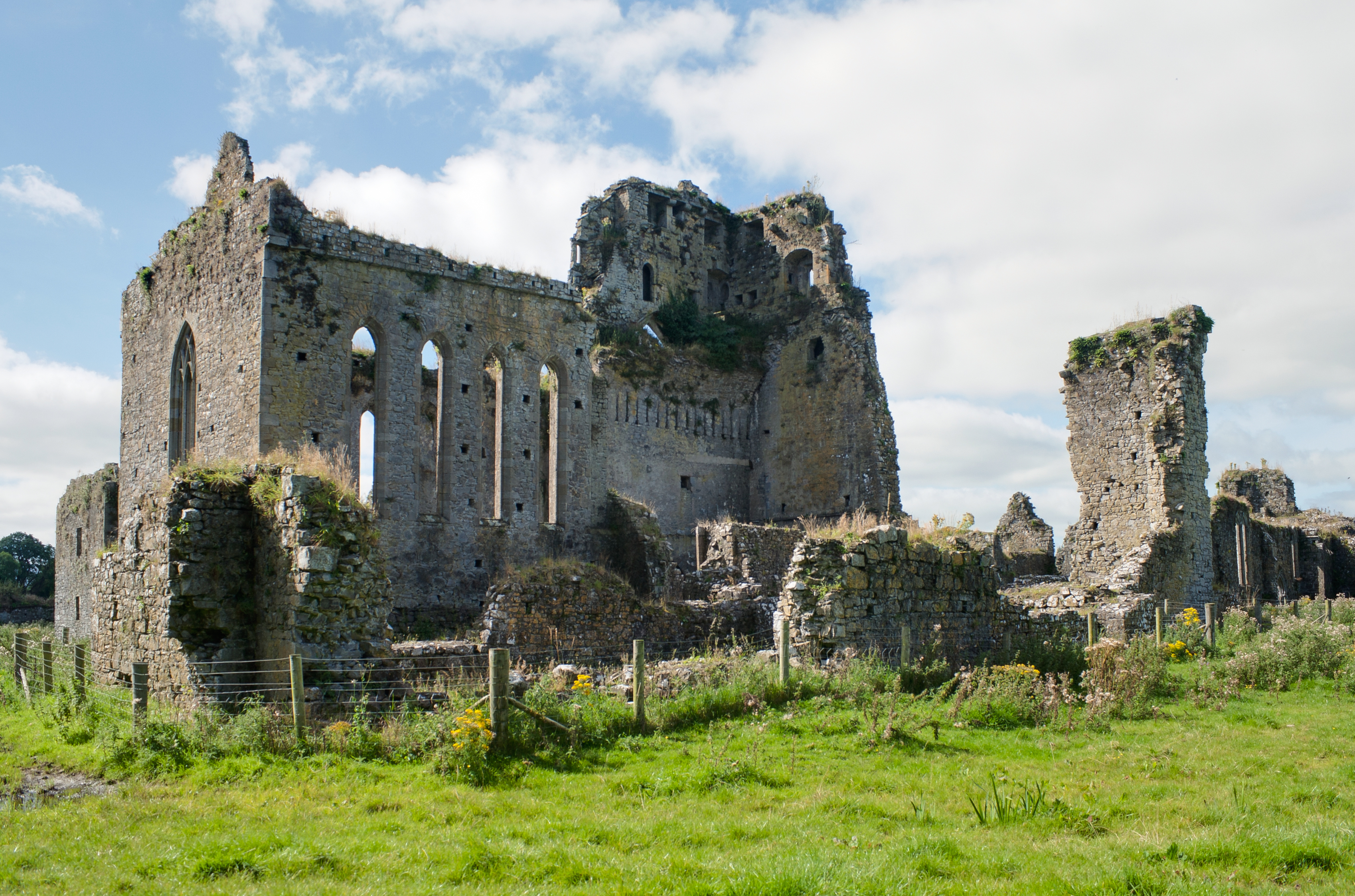
The Choir and Tower of Athassel Priory

He died during the Winter of 1205/06 and was interred at the Augustinian Priory of Athassel in Golden which he had founded c. 1200. The Annals of the Four Masters recorded his passing thus:

"William Burke plundered Connacht, as well churches as territories; but God and the saints took vengeance on him for that; for he died of a singular disease, too shameful to be described."

== Family ==
William de Burgh's wife was the daughter of Domnall Mór Ó Briain, King of Thomond, whom he married in around 1193. A late medieval genealogy found in the Book of Lecan (dated c.1397-1418) records his marriage to an unnamed daughter of Donmal Mor mac Turlough O'Brien, and the descent of the Earls of Ulster and Clanricarde from their son Richard. William de Burgh had three sons and at least one daughter:

- Richard Mór de Burgh, 1st Lord of Connaught
- Hubert de Burgh, Bishop of Limerick
- William de Burgh (the younger), Sheriff of Connacht

== Genealogy ==
de Burgh Genealogy: Lords of Connacht, Earls of Ulster and Earls of Kent

Walter de Burgh of Burgh Castle, Norfolk m. Alice
William de Burgh (d. 1206)	Geoffrey de Burgh; Bishop of Ely (d. 1228)	Hubert de Burgh; 1st Earl of Kent; Regent of England (d. before 1243)	Thomas de Burgh; Castellan of Norwich
Richard Mór / Óge de Burgh; Lord of Connacht (d. 1242/3)	Hubert de Burgh; Bishop of Limerick (d. 1250)	William de Burgh; Sheriff of Connacht	John de Burgh	Hubert de Burgh
Sir Richard de Burgh; Constable of Montgomery Castle (d. 1248)	Walter de Burgh; Lord of Connacht; 1st Earl of Ulster (d. 1271)	Sir William Óg de Burgh; Anglo-Irish Noble and Warrior (d. 1270)	Barons Burgh of Gainsborough; 15th century
Richard Óg de Burgh; Lord of Connacht; 2nd Earl of Ulster (1259–1326)	de Burgh/Burkes of Mayo (Mac William Íochtar)	de Burgh / Burke of Galway (Mac William Uachtar/ Clanricarde)
Elizabeth de Burgh; Queen of Scots (c.1289–1327) m. Robert I King of Scots	John de Burgh (1286–1313)	Sir Edmond de Burgh (1298–1338)
William Donn de Burgh; Lord of Connacht; 3rd Earl of Ulster (1312–33)	de Burgh / Burke of ClanWilliam
Elizabeth de Burgh; 4th Countess of Ulster (1332–63) m. Lionel; Duke of Clarence

== See also ==
- House of Burgh, an Anglo-Norman and Hiberno-Norman dynasty founded in 1193
- Hubert de Burgh, 1st Earl of Kent (c. 1170–before 1243), Chief Justiciar and Regent of England
- Geoffrey de Burgh (c. 1180–1228), English Bishop of Ely
- Earl of Ulster, earldom created in the Peerage of Ireland
- Lord of Connaught, title claimed in the Peerage of Ireland
- Burke Civil War 1333-38
- Mac William Íochtar Mac William Íochtar (Lower Mac William) or Mayo (Lower Connaught) Burkes
- Clanricarde (Mac William Uachtar/Upper Mac William) or Galway (Upper Connaught) Burkes
- Viscount Mayo, viscountcy created in the Peerage of Ireland in 1627
- Earl of Mayo, earldom created in the Peerage of Ireland in 1785
