= Athassel Priory =

Largest medieval priory in Ireland

Coordinates: 52°28′46″N 7°59′01″W

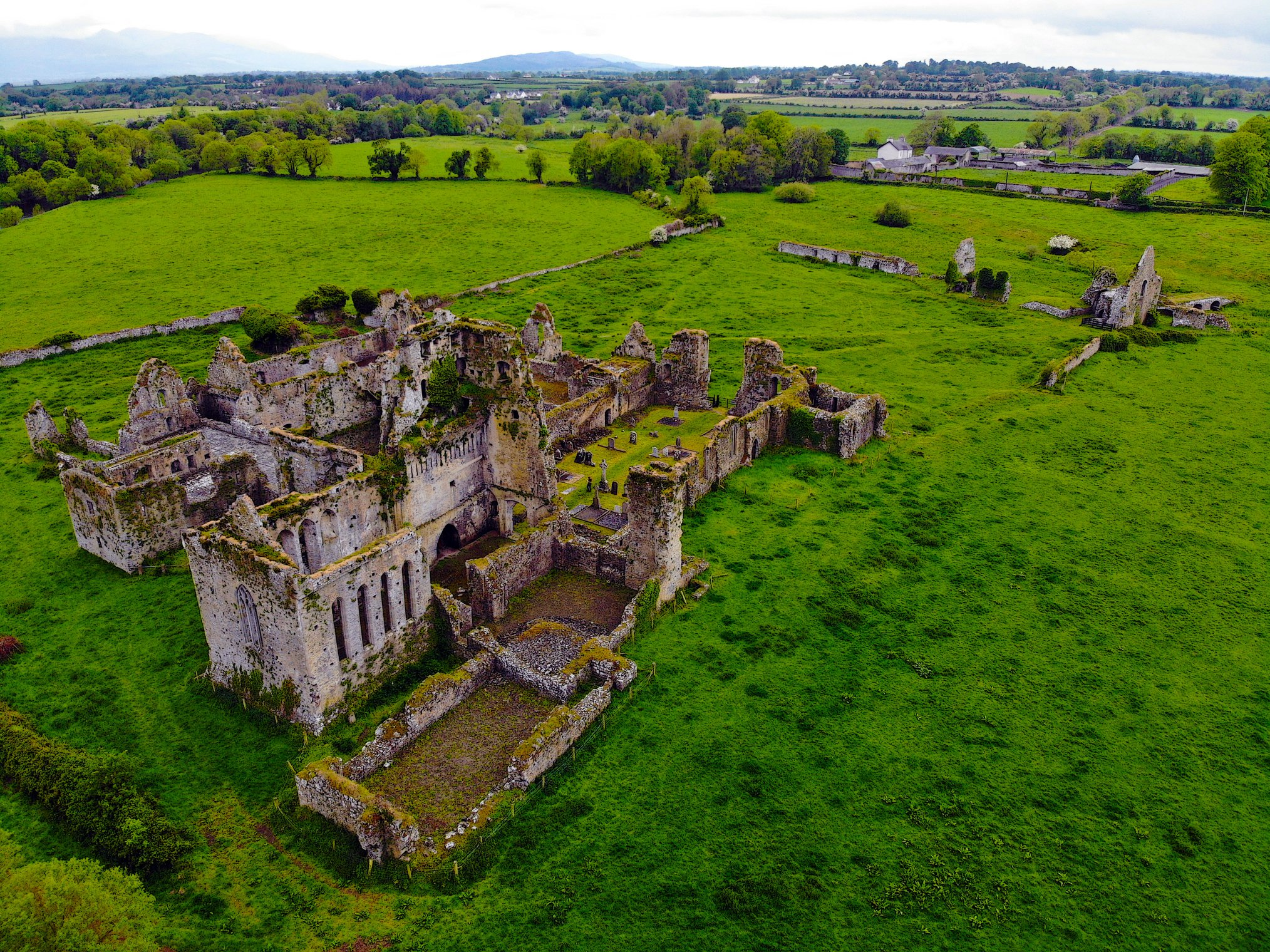
- Interactive map of Athassel Priory

Monastery information
- Order: Augustinian Canons Regular
- Established: 12th century
- Disestablished: 1537

Architecture
- Status: Priory
- Functional status: Ruins
- Style: Gothic
- Groundbreaking: c. 1200

Site
- Location: Golden, County Tipperary
- Country: Ireland

Athassel Priory (/æˈtæsəl/ a-TASS-əl) is the largest medieval priory in Ireland, stretching over a 4-acre (1.6 ha) site. The priory dates back to the late 12th century when it was founded by the Augustinians under the patronage of William de Burgh (founder of Ireland's Burke Dynasty). William's grandson Hubert de Burgh, (or Burgo) later the Bishop of Limerick, was prior at Athassel c. 1221. The original buildings were altered and renovated over the next 300 years. The priory was burnt twice, once in 1329 by Brian King of Thomond and again in 1581 by John Fitzgerald of Desmond. A large town had grown up around the priory but was destroyed during the two raids. The priory was finally dissolved in 1537 and the lands given to Thomas Butler, 10th Earl of Ormond, who neglected the abbey, and it subsequently fell into ruin.

== Architecture ==
The priory is accessed by a bridge and gate-lodge. Here the visitor can begin to note patterns that will be discerned throughout the site. The reconstruction and modification of the buildings is evident, often involving their "downsizing" to meet the needs of a smaller community. Nothing remains of the town that once surrounded the priory. The main aisle of the priory was used in recent centuries as a burial ground. The now blocked-up rood screen can be seen over the doorway in the centre. The walls are full of put-log holes, now ideal nest sites for dozens of jackdaws. These holes were used in construction to affix scaffolding-timbers.

Extensive remains of monastics quarters are located to the south of the priory. The buildings are mostly made of limestone and rubble.

== Burials ==
- Walter de Burgh, 1st Earl of Ulster
- Richard Óg de Burgh, 2nd Earl of Ulster
- William de Burgh, died 1205, founder of the de Burgh dynasty in Ireland

== See also ==
- List of abbeys and priories in Ireland (County Tipperary)
