= Book of the de Burgos =

16th-century Gaelic illuminated manuscript

- Trinity College Library
- Folio 19r
- Also known as: Book of the Burkes
- Date: between 1571 and 1584
- Place of origin: Connacht
- Language(s): Early Modern Irish, Latin
- Patron: Seaán mac Oliver Bourke
- Material: Vellum
- Format: Folio
- Script: Irish minuscule
- Contents: genealogy, poetry
- Illumination: Irish soldiers

The Book of the de Burgos or Book of the Burkes (Irish: Leabhar na Búrca; Latin: Liber Burgensis) is a late 16th-century Gaelic illuminated manuscript held by the Library of Trinity College Dublin as MS 1440, Historia et Genealogia Familiae de Burgo. The book consists of seventy-five folios, twenty-two of which remain blank.

It was made for Sir Seaán mac Oliver Bourke, 17th Mac William Íochtar (d. 1580) (Note: "MacWilliam" being the title of the chieftain of the Irish sept (Mac William Íochtar) rather than a surname.) of Mayo from 1571 to 1580. Believed to have been the product of his patronage, its production appears to have ceased upon his death, except for a few additions in 1584.

"It is, as far as we know, the last of the great family books written in Irish, but its text has remained rather bleak, the poems that were probably intended to fill the blank pages never having been copied".

The text is of two symmetrical documents in Irish and Latin respectively, containing many fanciful genealogical links between the House of Burgh (Latin: de Burgo; Irish: de Búrca) and Charlemagne, the Kings of Jerusalem, France and England. What distinguishes the Book of the de Burgos from other late medieval Irish manuscripts is its visual style, with large pictures which are "extremely crude and brutal in colour, but arresting by their originality and their vehemence. Movements are awkward but convincing... skies are red or yellow, dogs are green, there is a constant disproportion of the figures, but a sort of brutal integrity emanates from these images... gaudy and violently realistic."

There are four scenes of the Passion, nine family portraits and a page on their coat of arms. Two poems inserted at the end of the book are praise-poems written by Tadhg Dall Ó hUiginn and Ruaidhrí mac Domhnall Ó hUiginn, for Sir Seaán Bourke. The book ends with two legal deeds in Latin, dated 1584, between Walter Ciotach Burke (son of Seaán) and the Barretts, who laid claim to possession of Belleek Castle. There are later comments in English in a later hand from the original scribe - "Olyverus Bourke mac Sheamus died the last daye of December Annno Dom. 1619 in his house at Inisquoe."

== See also ==
- William de Burgh
- House of Burgh, an Anglo-Norman and Hiberno-Norman dynasty founded in 1193
- Burke Civil War 1333-38
- Earls of Ulster
- Mac William Íochtar (Lower Mac William) or Mayo (Lower Connaught) Burkes
- Clanricarde (Mac William Uachtar/Upper Mac William) or Galway (Upper Connaught) Burkes
- Earl of Clanricarde, earldom created in the Peerage of Ireland in 1543 and 1800
- Earl of Mayo, earldom created in the Peerage of Ireland in 1785
