= Walter Liath de Burgh =

Anglo-Irish magnate (d.1332)

Sir Walter Liath de Burgh
- Native name: Walter Liath de Búrca
- Born: Galway, Ireland
- Died: February 1332
- Noble family: House of Burgh
- Spouse: Margaret
- Issue: Matilda de Burgh
- Father: William Liath de Burgh
- Mother: Finola Ni Briain

Sir Walter Liath de Burgh (English: /dəˈbɜːr/ də-BUR; died February 1332) was an Anglo-Irish noble whose imprisonment by the Earl of Ulster and death from starvation led to the Earl's murder the following year.

== Early life ==
De Burgh was the eldest son of Sir William Liath de Burgh and Finola Ni Briain, daughter of King Brian Ruad of Thomond. He is first attested in 1326 when he and the late Earl of Ulster's son, Sir Edmond de Burgh, were appointed guardians of the peace in Connacht, Tipperary and Limerick, and custodians of the late earl's lands in those counties.

== Burke Civil War ==
De Burgh aggrandized the lordship of Connacht to himself and so a battle broke out between him and his cousin, William Donn de Burgh, Earl of Ulster, for power. Warfare continued until November 1331 when the Earl captured Walter and his two brothers, imprisoning them in Northburgh Castle, County Donegal. Walter died there of starvation in February 1332.

Walter's sister, Gylle de Burgh, planned revenge on the earl. She persuaded her husband, Richard de Mandeville, and John de Logan to murder William Donn in Carrickfergus on 6 June 1333. This death was a catastrophe for the Anglo-Irish colony, as within six months all Ulster west of the Bann was lost, while Connacht descended into factionalism. For over two hundred years it would remain largely outside the realm of the Dublin government. It was these deaths that would begin the Burke Civil War.

== Family ==
Walter was married to a woman called Margaret, and had one known child, Matilda. Margaret later married Aedh O Conchobair, a king of Connacht. She died in 1361. Matilda married William, son of Sir John Darcy.

== See also ==
- House of Burgh, an Anglo-Norman and Hiberno-Norman dynasty founded in 1193
- Burke Civil War
- Mac William Iochtar
- Clanricarde
