= Gylle de Burgh =

Anglo-Irish lady (living 1332)

- Native name: Gylle de Búrca
- Born: Galway, Ireland
- Noble family: de Burgh
- Spouse: Richard de Manderville
- Father: William Liath de Burgh

Gylle de Burgh (English: /dəˈbɜːr/ də-BUR; fl. 1332) was an Anglo-Irish noblewoman and wife of Richard de Manderville.

De Burgh was the only daughter of Sir William Liath de Burgh (died 1323) and a sister of Sir Walter Liath de Burgh. Walter was captured and starved to death by his cousin, the Earl of Ulster, in 1332.

Gylle, married to Richard de Manderville, had her husband and his family kill the earl at Carrickfergus on 6 June 1333 in revenge. This murder was directly responsible for the destruction of the great de Burgh lordship of Connacht, and the loss of Ulster to the Gaelic-Irish till the Ulster Plantations of 1610.

== See also ==
- House of Burgh, an Anglo-Norman and Hiberno-Norman dynasty founded in 1193
- Earl of Ulster
