= Elizabeth de Burgh, 4th Countess of Ulster =

Anglo-Irish noble (1332–1363)

Elizabeth de Burgh
- Arms of de Burgh: Or, a cross gules.

suo jure Countess of Ulster
- Predecessor: William Donn de Burgh, 3rd Earl
- Successor: Philippa Plantagenet, 5th Countess with Edmund Mortimer, 3rd Earl of March
- jure uxoris Earl: Lionel of Antwerp, 1st Duke of Clarence
- Born: 6 July 1332; Carrickfergus Castle, Carrickfergus, County Antrim, Ireland
- Died: 10 December 1363 (aged 31); Dublin, Ireland
- Burial: Bruisyard, Suffolk
- Spouse: Lionel of Antwerp, 1st Duke of Clarence (m. 1342)
- Issue: Philippa Plantagenet, 5th Countess of Ulster
- House: Burgh
- Father: William Donn de Burgh, 3rd Earl of Ulster
- Mother: Maud of Lancaster

Elizabeth de Burgh, Duchess of Clarence, suo jure 4th Countess of Ulster and 5th Baroness of Connaught (English: /dəˈbɜːr/ də-BUR; 6 July 1332 – 10 December 1363) was a Norman-Irish noblewoman who married the English prince Lionel of Antwerp.

== Family ==
Elizabeth was born at Carrickfergus Castle near Belfast, Ireland, the only child of William Donn de Burgh, 3rd Earl of Ulster, and Maud of Lancaster. Elizabeth was the last of the senior legitimate line of the descendants of William de Burgh. Her paternal grandparents were John de Burgh and Elizabeth de Clare, and her maternal grandparents were Henry, 3rd Earl of Lancaster and Maud Chaworth. Her younger half-sister was Maud de Ufford, through her mother's second marriage to Sir Ralph de Ufford, Justiciar of Ireland.

Upon William's murder on 6 June 1333, she became the Countess of Ulster and the sole legal heir to all the de Burgh lands in Ireland. Actually, her kinsmen Sir Edmond de Burgh of Clanwilliam, Sir Edmond Albanach Bourke the Mac William Iochtar, Sir Ulick Burke the Mac William Uachtar became the de facto heads of the family and owners of de Burgh land during the Burke Civil War. This is because she was merely 11 months old at the time.

== Marriage ==
Elizabeth was raised in England and married prince Lionel of Antwerp on 9 September 1342 at the Tower of London. He was the second son of Edward III of England and his queen consort, Philippa of Hainault. As a boy, the poet Geoffrey Chaucer served as page to Elizabeth.

The couple had one child, Philippa, born on 16 August 1355, the eldest grandchild of Edward III and Queen Philippa. Elizabeth's daughter Philippa succeeded as Countess of Ulster, and married Edmund Mortimer, 3rd Earl of March, in 1368. Both their titles passed to their son Roger Mortimer, and eventually through their granddaughter Anne de Mortimer, who married into the House of York. The House of York would base its claim to the English throne on their descent from Lionel of Antwerp.

Elizabeth died in Dublin in 1363 during her husband's term as Governor of Ireland. She was buried at Bruisyard Abbey, Suffolk; as her body was being repatriated, her husband obtained royal approval for her mother's new foundation of Franciscan nuns there.

== Ancestry ==
Ancestors of Elizabeth de Burgh, 4th Countess of Ulster

8. Richard Óg de Burgh, 2nd Earl of Ulster
4. John de Burgh
9. Margaret de Burgh
2. William Donn de Burgh, 3rd Earl of Ulster
10. Gilbert de Clare, 6th Earl of Hertford
5. Elizabeth de Clare
11. Joan of Acre
1. Elizabeth de Burgh, 4th Countess of Ulster
12. Edmund Crouchback, 1st Earl of Lancaster
6. Henry, 3rd Earl of Lancaster
13. Blanche of Artois
3. Maud of Lancaster
14. Sir Patrick de Chaworth, Lord of Kidwelly
7. Maud Chaworth
15. Isabella de Beauchamp

== See also ==
- House of Burgh, an Anglo-Norman and Hiberno-Norman dynasty founded in 1193

Peerage of Ireland
Preceded by William Donn de Burgh, 3rd Earl	Countess of Ulster with Lionel of Antwerp, Duke of Clarence; 1333–1363	Succeeded by Philippa Plantagenet, 5th Countess with Edmund Mortimer, 3rd Earl of March
