= Gillick =

The surname (Mc)Gillick is a patronymic adopted by a branch of the Burkes of Connacht, and originates from the Irish Mag Uilic, meaning 'son of Ulick'. Mag is a form of Mac (son) used in old Irish names before vowels. William is Uilliam in Gaelic, and 'William the Younger' is Uilliam Og. As time passed, Uilliam Og was contracted to Uilleog, anglicized Ulick, which literally means 'young William', but has also come to mean 'little William'. The name Ulick came into use amongst the Burkes in the 14th century, and was originally peculiar to this family.

== Gillick ancestor ==
The Gillicks have as their eponymous ancestor, Ulick de Burgo of Umhall (confused by MacFirbis with Ulick de Burgo of Annaghkeen, a contemporary kinsman), and descend through his son, Henry MacUlick. The deaths of both are recorded in the Annals of Loch Cé:

1343: Ulick son of Richard son of William Liath, the greatest of all the foreign (i.e. Anglo-Norman, not native Irish) youths in Ireland in bounty and prowess, quievit.

1359: Henry son of Ulick son of Richard mortuus est.

The descendants of this Henry used MacUlick as a surname, but the clan name was MacHenry.

== Clan Henry ==
The 'Division of Connacht and Thomond' places the land of Clan Henry in the barony of Dunkellin, and names among the gentlemen and their castles:

- Hubert McEdmund McUllig: Cloghestokin
- Richard McUllig: Saeffyne
- Ullig Laragh McEdmund and his brethren: Gortenemakyn
- Shane McEdmund McUllig: Row
- Shane Reowgh: Cragymulgreny
- Shane fitzjohn Burke: Manen
- Edmund McUllig's sonnes: Cahergeale

The Composition of Clanricard in 1585, states that 'Pobbil Clanhenry' of the east comprised 28 quarters. The principal seat of the MacHenry Burkes was Gortnamackan. This castle is in that townland in the part of the parish of Kilchrist which is in Dunkellin barony. Cahergal also is in that townland of Killogilleen parish. Creggymulgreny is now shortened to Cregg Castle. These castles form a group in the east of the barony.

== Fiants ==
In the Elizabethan Fiants (1554–1601) there are no less than 51 persons of the name mentioned, spelled in 12 variant forms (usually MacUlick, MacUllock, etc.). The majority of these are in Connacht, mainly County Galway, and they frequently appear in association with Burkes, as also do quite a number in Munster. There were no (Mc)Gillicks at that time in the Cavan–Meath area. And none are listed as being there in the 1659 census (but Cavan is missing from it). There is only one entry for the name in the Fiants of Henry VIII to Mary: one James Willock, a kern (lightly armed fighting man) of Ballybretnagh, County Westmeath.

It was the opinion of Edward MacLysaght, first Chief Herald of Ireland, that the surname (Mc)Gillick was likely taken to the adjoining counties of Cavan and Meath by migrating kerns of that name, who began families which, in due course, multiplied and originated the considerable number of persons found there in the 1800s.

== Breakdown by area ==
Griffith's Valuation (c. 1853), listing land or house holders, shows as follows:

County Cavan
Castlerahan: 32 Gillick, 1 McGillick
Clanmahon: 4 Gillick, 0 McGillick
Clonkee: 0 Gillick, 5 McGillick
Loughtree Upper: 1 Gillick, 9 McGillick
Tullygarvey: 3 Gillick, 3 McGillick

County Meath
Fore: 7 Gillick, 0 McGillick
Kells Lower: 0 Gillick, 1 McGillick
Kells Upper: 5 Gillick, 4 McGillick
Navan Lower: 0 Gillick, 1 McGillick
Navan Upper: 1 Gillick, 0 McGillick

The Tithe Applotment Books of a generation earlier indicate that all those families were in the same area then. Nineteenth century records show the (Mc)Gillicks to have been then almost exclusively in the Cavan-Meath area.

== Frequency of the name in Ireland ==
In Robert Matheson's Special Report on Surnames in Ireland is a list showing names having five entries or upwards in the Birth Indexes of 1890. In this list the name (Mc)Gillick appears nine times for the whole of Ireland—eight instances being in County Cavan and one in the province of Munster.

MacLysaght felt that the majority of the (Mc)Gillicks in Connacht and Munster, separated from others of their name who had migrated east, most likely reverted to their original surname of Burke. Presently, apart from instances of families of the name who have moved to Dublin or other large urban centres, the name (Mc)Gillick is practically unknown in Ireland outside the Cavan-Meath area, and even there the name is now very rare due, in large part, to 19th century emigration to England, Scotland, and North America.

== Heraldry ==
Arms: Or, a cross Gules, in the first quarter a lion's head erased Sable, langued Gules. Crest: A demi-catamount rampant guardant proper, ducally gorged and chained Or. Motto: Ung Je Serviray (One Will I Serve).

== People with the surname ==
- Victoria Gillick, a Catholic family campaigner
- David Gillick, Irish track and field athlete
- Ernest Gillick, British sculptor
- James Gillick, British artist
- Liam Gillick, British artist
- Mary Gillick, British sculptor
- Pat Gillick, American baseball executive
- Torrance Gillick, Scottish footballer
- Ernest Gillick, British sculptor

== See also ==
- Gillick competence, a term in medical law

== Sources ==
=== Printed Sources ===
- Griffith, R.; General Valuation of Ireland
- Knox R.Y.; "The de Burgo Clans of Galway" in the Journal of the Galway Historical Society
- MacLysaght E.; Irish Surnames
- Matheson, R.E.; Special Report on Surnames in Ireland
- Pender S.; Census of Ireland, 1659
- Woulfe Rev. P.; Irish Names and Surnames

=== Genealogical Office Sources ===
Dublin Grants and Wills to 1858
Fiants (temp. Henry VIII to Elizabeth)
G.O. MS 429
G.O. MS 469
G.O. MS 470
Grants of Arms
Prerogative Wills
Registered Pedigrees
Unofficial Pedigrees
