= William Donn de Burgh, 3rd Earl of Ulster =

Irish noble (1312–33)

- Uilleag Donn de Búrca
- Arms of William Donn de Burgh: Or, a cross gules.

Lieutenant of Ireland
- In office 3 March 1331 – 5 November 1331
- Preceded by: John Darcy
- Succeeded by: Anthony de Lucy

Personal details
- Born: 13 September 1312
- Died: 6 June 1333 (aged 20)
- Spouse: Maud of Lancaster
- Children: Elizabeth de Burgh, 4th Countess of Ulster
- Parent(s): John de Burgh; Elizabeth de Clare

William de Burgh, 3rd Earl of Ulster and 4th Baron of Connaught (English: /dəˈbɜːr/ də-BUR; 17 September 1312 – 6 June 1333) was an Irish noble who was Lieutenant of Ireland (1331) and whose murder, aged 20, led to the Burke Civil War.

== Background ==
The grandson of the 2nd Earl Richard Óg de Burgh via his second son, John, William de Burgh was also Lord of Connaught in Ireland, and held the manor of Clare, Suffolk.

He was summoned to Parliament from 10 December 1327 to 15 June 1328 by writs addressed to Willelmo de Burgh. He is considered the first Baron Burgh. In March 1331 he was appointed Lieutenant of Ireland, serving until November 1331.

== Marriage and issue ==
The 3rd Earl of Ulster married, before 16 November 1327 (by a Papal Dispensation dated 1 May 1327), Maud of Lancaster, daughter of Henry, 3rd Earl of Lancaster and Maud Chaworth. They had one surviving child, Elizabeth, who was 13 months old when her father was murdered.

She married Lionel of Antwerp, third son of Edward III of England.

Maud remarried to Sir Ralph Ufford, Justiciar of Ireland 1344–46, and had further issue. She was said to have had great influence over her second husband.

== Murder ==
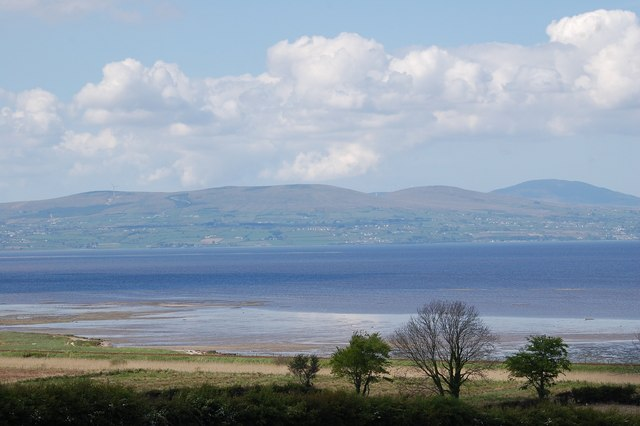
Lough Foyle

In February 1332, at Greencastle, near the mouth of Lough Foyle, he had his cousin Sir Walter Liath de Burgh starved to death. In revenge, Sir Walter's sister, Gylle de Burgh, wife of Sir Richard de Mandeville, planned his assassination.

In June 1333, he was killed by de Mandeville, Sir John de Logan, and others. His widow, Maud (or Matilda), offered a reward for the capture of de Mandeville and his wife.

The Annals of the Four Masters noted that

"William Burke, Earl of Ulster, was killed by the English of Ulster. The Englishmen who committed this deed were put to death, in divers ways, by the people of the King of England; some were hanged, others killed, and others torn asunder, in revenge of his death."

Maud fled to England, where she remarried, was again widowed in 1346, and then became an Augustinian canoness at Campsey Priory in Suffolk, where she is buried. Upon his death, the various factions of the de Burghs, now called Burke, began the Burke Civil War for supremacy.

== Ancestry ==
Ancestors of William Donn de Burgh, 3rd Earl of Ulster

8. Walter de Burgh, 1st Earl of Ulster
4. Richard Óg de Burgh, 2nd Earl of Ulster
9. Aveline FitzGeoffrey
2. John de Burgh
10. Sir John de Burgh
5. Margaret de Burgh
11. Hawise of Lanvaley
1. William Donn de Burgh, 3rd Earl of Ulster
12. Richard de Clare, 5th Earl of Hertford
6. Gilbert de Clare, 6th Earl of Hertford
13. Maud de Lacy
3. Elizabeth de Clare
14. Edward I of England
7. Joan of Acre
15. Eleanor of Castile

== See also ==
- House of Burgh, an Anglo-Norman and Hiberno-Norman dynasty founded in 1193
- Lord of Connaught

Government offices
Preceded by John Darcy	Lieutenant of Ireland; 1331	Succeeded by Anthony de Lucy
Peerage of Ireland
Preceded by Richard Óg de Burgh	Earl of Ulster; 1326–1333	Succeeded by Elizabeth de Burgh
