= Castle Connell =

Ruined fortification in County Limerick, Ireland

Coordinates: 52°42′43.71″N 08°30′13.18″W

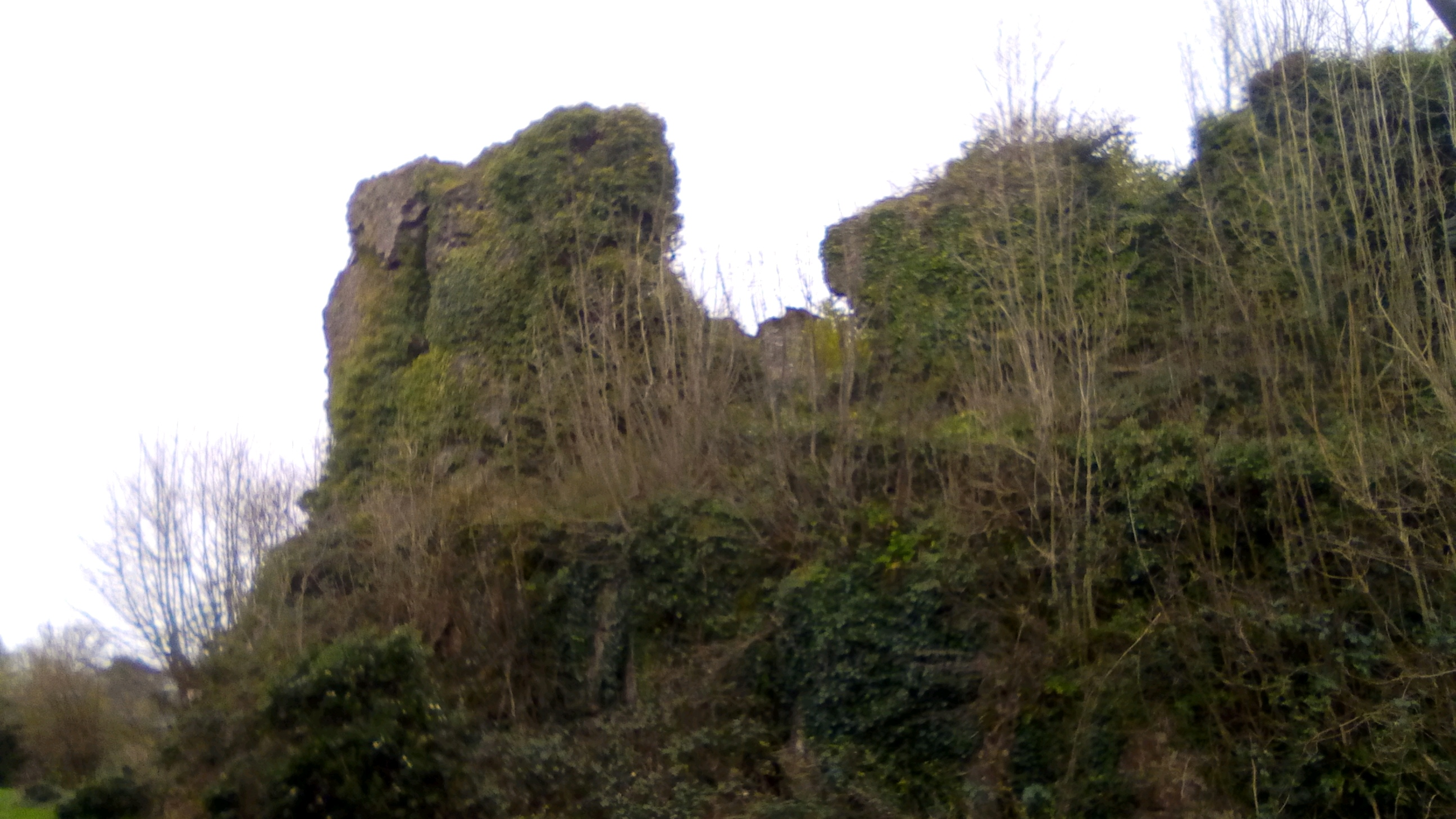
Ruins of Castle Connell in March 2020

Castle Connell (Irish: Caisleán Uí Chonaill) was a castle on the banks of the River Shannon in the village of Castleconnell, approximately 11 km (6.8 mi) from the city of Limerick, Ireland.

== History ==
The castle was built on a rock overlooking the River Shannon by the O'Connell's. It was the seat of the chief of Hy-Cuilean, a territory south-east of Abbeyfeale, in the barony of Upper Connello near the borders of Cork and Kerry. The castle then came into the possession of the O'Briens of Thomond.

The castle was blown up by General Godert de Ginkel during the War of the Two Kings. Its ruins are visible on the approach to the village on the road from Limerick.

== See also ==
- Carrigogunnell, a castle on the west side of Limerick

== Bibliography ==
- Barry, James Grene (1889), "William Fitz-Adelm de Burgh and The Bourkes of Clanwilliam", Journal of the Royal Society of Antiquaries of Ireland, archived from the original on 29 March 2013
- Robertson, Ian (1979), Ireland, Blue guide (4, illustrated ed.), E. Benn

Attribution
