= Edmond de Burgh =

Irish knight (1298–1338)

Sir Edmund de Burgh
- Edmund de Búrca
- Born: 1298
- Died: 1338 (aged 39–40)
- Children: Sir Richard Burke; Sir David Burke
- Parent: Richard Óg de Burgh, 2nd Earl of Ulster
- Relatives: John de Burgh (brother)

Sir Edmund de Burgh (English: /dəˈbɜːr/ də-BUR; 1298–1338) was an Irish knight and ancestor of the Burke family of Clanwilliam.

== Background ==
De Burgh was the fifth and last surviving son of Richard, Lord of Connaught and Earl of Ulster. His elder brother, John de Burgh, died at Galway in 1313 and was survived by a son, William, who became the 3rd Earl of Ulster.

Edmond lived in what is now County Limerick, where his personal estates lay. He was the father of at least two children, Sir Richard Burke and Sir David Burke, both of whom were alive in 1387. Sir Richard was the father of Walter (died 1432) and Uileag Carragh, who were the ancestor of the Burkes of Castleconnell (later Barons Bourke of Castleconnell) and Burkes of Brittas (later Barons Bourke of Brittas), and Burkes of Cois tSiúire, respectively. Sir David was the ancestor of the Burkes of Muskerryquirk. All three septs would be collectively referred to as the Burkes of Clanwilliam.

== Burke Civil War ==
The murder of William Donn de Burgh, 3rd Earl of Ulster in June 1333 led to a three-way struggle among the leading members of the de Burgh/Burke family for supremacy. Edmond was the senior male member of the family, as he was uncle to William Donn and eldest surviving son of the 2nd Earl. He fought against his cousins in Connacht in an attempt to control the vast de Burgh estates, both for his personal estates and that of his grand-niece, Elizabeth de Burgh.

Because none of the three main contenders could overcome each other, the de Burgh lands in Ulster were almost entirely regained by the Gaelic-Irish, while Connaught was split in half between the cousins Edmond Albanach de Burgh of north Connacht (mainly County Mayo) and Ulick Burke of Annaghkeen in south Connacht (mainly east County Galway). By 1340, the family had divided into three separate, independent lordships:

- Clan William Burke of County Limerick
- Mac William Íochtar of County Mayo
- Clanricarde of County Galway

== Death ==
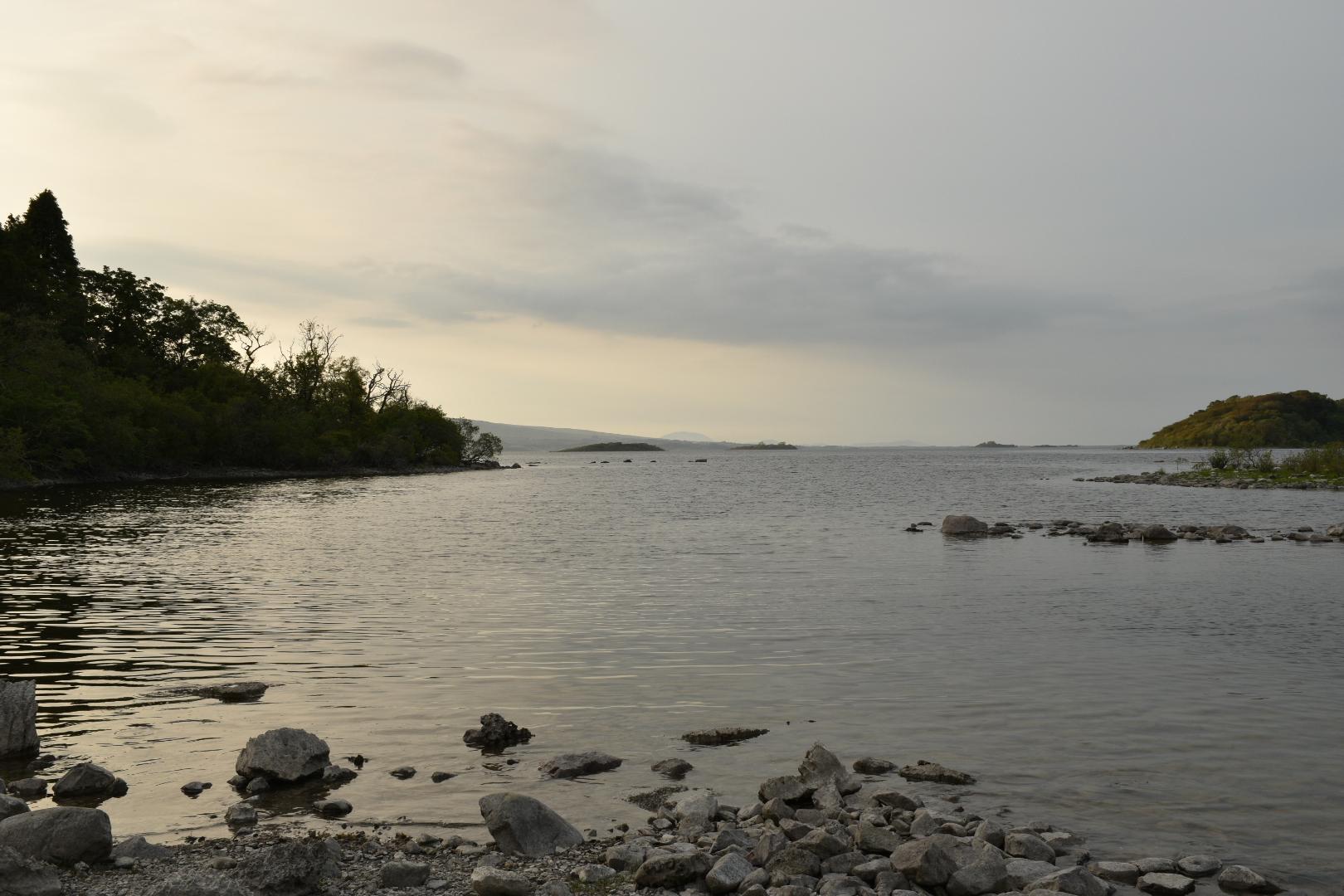
Lough Mask.

Edmond died in 1338 when he and his men were trying to visit the Augustinian Friars in the town of Ballinrobe. A band of men headed by Edmond Albanach Burke forcibly entered the monastery and seized Edmond after a short resistance. Edmond was taken prisoner and carried all the way to Oilean-an-lara (the Earls Island). He was drowned in Lough Mask.

The incident is recorded in the Annals of the Four Masters:

M1338.3. The son of the Earl of Ulster, i.e. Edmond, was taken prisoner by Edmond Burke, who fastened a stone to his neck and drowned him in Lough Mask. The destruction of the English of Connaught, and of his own in particular, resulted from this deed. Turlough O'Conor afterwards banished Edmond Mac William Burke out of Connaught, after the territories and churches of the west of Connaught had been greatly destroyed between them; and O'Conor then assumed the sway of the whole province.

== Arms ==
Coat of arms of Edmond de Burgh
Escutcheon Or, a cross gules the first quarter charged with a dexter hand couped at the wrist and erect sable

== See also ==
- House of Burgh, an Anglo-Norman and Hiberno-Norman dynasty founded in 1193
- Lord of Connaught
- Earl of Ulster
- Baron Bourke of Castleconnell, barony created in the Peerage of Ireland in 1580
- Baron Bourke of Brittas, barony created in the Peerage of Ireland in 1618
