= Elizabeth de Clare =

English heiress (1295–1360)

- 11th Lady of Clare; Lady de Burgh; Baroness d'Amory
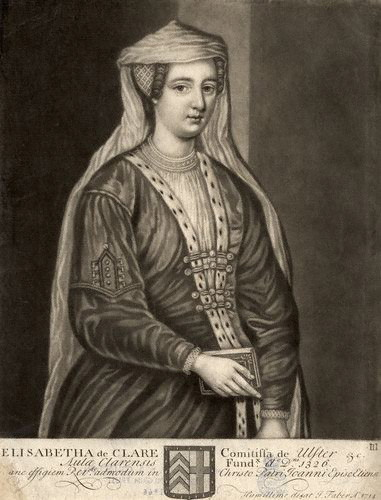
- Mezzotint of Clare by John Faber the Elder, 1714
- Born: 16 September 1295; Tewkesbury, Gloucestershire, England
- Died: 4 November 1360; Ware, Hertfordshire, England
- Noble family: de Clare
- Spouses: John de Burgh; Theobald II de Verdun; Roger d'Amory
- Issue: William de Burgh, 3rd Earl of Ulster; Isabel de Verdun; Elizabeth d'Amory
- Father: Gilbert de Clare, 6th Earl of Hertford
- Mother: Joan of Acre

Elizabeth de Clare, 11th Lady of Clare (16 September 1295 – 4 November 1360) was a member of the Anglo-Norman family, de Clare, and heiress to the lordships of Clare, Suffolk, in England and Usk in Wales.

She is sometimes referred to as Elizabeth de Burgh (English: /dəˈbɜːr/ də-BUR), due to her first marriage to John de Burgh. Her two subsequent husbands were Theobald II de Verdun (of the Butler-de Verdun family) and Roger d'Amory.

Later in life, Elizabeth, as a widow, was a religious and educational benefactress, mainly to establishments in East Anglia. These included the second-oldest surviving college of the University of Cambridge, Clare College, which took its name after her.

== Life ==
Elizabeth was the daughter of Gilbert de Clare, 6th Earl of Hertford and Joan of Acre, daughter of King Edward I of England. She was the youngest of the three daughters, her father having died when she was a baby.

== Marriages ==
Elizabeth de Clare married three times. She had three children; one by each husband. Her father had been one of England's wealthiest and most powerful nobles but when Elizabeth's only brother, Gilbert de Clare, 7th Earl of Hertford and 8th Earl of Gloucester, was killed at the Battle of Bannockburn in 1314 aged only 23 and leaving no surviving issue, his property, estimated to be worth £6,000/year, was equally divided between his three full sisters, Elizabeth, Eleanor and Margaret. This made Elizabeth one of the greatest heiresses in England.

=== First marriage ===
She accompanied her brother Gilbert to Ireland for their double wedding to two siblings: the son and daughter of the Earl of Ulster. Elizabeth married John de Burgh on 30 September 1308. He was the heir to the Earl of Ulster, and Elizabeth could expect to be a countess in due course. She gave birth to their only child, a son, in 1312; he would become William Donn de Burgh, 3rd Earl of Ulster. Only a year later, her husband John was unexpectedly killed in a minor skirmish in Galway. A widow, Elizabeth remained in Ireland until the death of her brother at the Battle of Bannockburn compelled her immediate return to England in July 1314.

=== Second marriage ===
Edward II placed her in Bristol Castle, but his plans to marry her to one of his supporters were dashed in February 1316, when Elizabeth was abducted from Bristol by Theobald II de Verdun, the former Justiciar of Ireland. He claimed that he and Elizabeth had been engaged before she was called back to England. She was Lady Verdun for only six months until Theobald died on 27 July 1316, at Alton, Staffordshire, from typhoid. He left behind three daughters from prior marriages and Elizabeth, who was pregnant. She fled to Amesbury Priory, where she stayed under the protection of her aunt Mary de Burgh, who was a nun there. At Amesbury she gave birth to Theobald's posthumous daughter, Isabel de Verdun (named for the Queen), who was born on 21 March 1317, and was baptised by the Bishop of Salisbury. The Verdun estates were partitioned among Theobald's four daughters as coheiresses and their husbands, and were granted to Elizabeth's third husband until the daughter came of age.

=== Third marriage ===
Just a few weeks later after Isabel's birth, Edward II married Elizabeth to Sir Roger D'Amory, Lord D'Amory, Baron of Amory in Ireland. D'Amory had been a knight in her brother's service who rose to prominence as a favourite of Edward II. Now married to him, Elizabeth was caught up in the political upheavals of her uncle's reign and was still only about 21 years old. She gave birth to another daughter, Elizabeth D'Amory, in May 1318. Roger was reckless and violent, and made a deadly enemy of his brother-in-law, Hugh Despenser the younger. D'Amory switched sides, joining the Marcher Lords led by Roger Mortimer and Thomas, Earl of Lancaster in the rebellion known as the Despenser War. He died of his wounds at Tutbury Castle, Staffordshire on 13 or 14 March 1322, having been captured by the royalist forces at the Battle of Burton Bridge where the rebels were soundly defeated. Elizabeth was captured at Usk Castle and imprisoned at Barking Abbey with her children by the victorious faction.

== Loss and recovery of property ==
Elizabeth's brother-in-law, Hugh Despenser the younger, lord of Glamorgan, became a favourite of King Edward II. With the support of the king he began to take over the adjacent lordships in south Wales, with the aim to consolidate a huge landholding by fair means or foul. He concentrated on the lordships held by his sisters-in-law and their husbands: Margaret and Hugh D'Audley (lordship of Gwynllwg or Newport), and Elizabeth and Roger Damory (lordship of Usk). Faced with this threat, the Marcher lords of south Wales, led by Damory, rose up against Despenser in May 1321 capturing his castles at Caerphilly and Cardiff. Their success contributed to the king's banishment of Hugh and his father on 14 August that year. This success was only short-lived as the king recalled the Despensers in October 1321 and launched a counter-offensive against the Marcher lords and their allies. Elizabeth was taken prisoner at Usk Castle in January 1322, and imprisoned in Barking Abbey, London, with her husband dying two months later. Elizabeth was forced by the king to exchange her lordship of Usk with Despenser's less-valuable lordship of Gower.

The rebellion of Queen Isabella of France and her lover Roger Mortimer, 1st Earl of March, saw King Edward II and Hugh Despenser flee to south Wales in October 1326. By this date Elizabeth seems to have been back in residence at Usk Castle, and she regained this lordship after Despenser's execution. She held a very elaborate Christmas feast that year in Usk Castle, perhaps partly in celebration of her adversary's death, for which the long list of food and drink survives in the collection of the National Archives. She also undertook building works at Usk and the nearby Llangibby Castle, where she would entertain her friends, Marie de St Pol, countess of Pembroke, first amongst these. She stayed at Usk from October 1348 until April 1350, perhaps to escape the Black Death.

== Later life ==
After D'Amory's death, Elizabeth de Clare never remarried and styled herself the 'Lady of Clare' after her principal estate in Suffolk. She also had a residence at Anglesey Abbey, Cambridgeshire, Great Bardfield, Essex, and in 1352 she built a London house in the precinct of the Franciscan Convent of the Minoresses, Aldgate. A good idea of her lifestyle in the last 25 years of her life can be taken from the extensive survival of her household and other records. These throw light on the activities of and provision of food and drink for the household (numbering up to 100 people) of one of the richest and most influential women of the fourteenth century. Amongst the records are the works of her personal goldsmith in 1333.

Elizabeth was a religious benefactress and in her records she also lists alms giving and patronage towards her favourite religious houses, such as the priories at Clare, Anglesey, and Walsingham (founded on her manor), and Denny Abbey.

Her most important and long-lasting foundation was Clare College, Cambridge. This began when she was asked to support University Hall, founded by Richard de Badew, in 1326. When Richard handed over his rights as patron to Elizabeth in 1346, she made further grants, including providing the college with statutes in 1359, and it became known as Clare Hall.

== Death ==
Elizabeth de Burgh died on 4 November 1360 and was buried at the convent of the Minoresses following a funeral costing £200. Her tomb has not survived but must have been elaborate. Her will with its extensive bequests is published along with her household records. Her seals are held in the collections at the British Library.

== Issue ==
- Elizabeth de Clare's eldest daughter, Isabel de Verdun married Henry de Ferrers, 2nd Baron Ferrers of Groby. The marriage produced at least five children, four of whom survived infancy.
- Her younger daughter, Elizabeth d'Amory, married John Bardolf, 3rd Lord Bardolf of Wormegay, Knight Banneret (1314–1363). They had three children.
- Her son William Donn de Burgh, 3rd Earl of Ulster and 4th Baron of Connaught married Maud of Lancaster, the daughter of Henry, 3rd Earl of Lancaster and Maud Chaworth. His wardship had been granted to her father. By his wife, William had one daughter, Elizabeth de Burgh, 4th Countess of Ulster, who was her father's sole heiress. She was betrothed to Edward III's third but second surviving son Lionel of Antwerp, 1st Duke of Clarence, in 1341, and they married on 9 September 1342 at the Tower of London.

== Ancestry ==
Ancestors of Elizabeth de Clare

8.Gilbert de Clare, 4th Earl of Hertford
4.Richard de Clare, 5th Earl of Hertford
9. Isabel Marshal
2.Gilbert de Clare, 6th Earl of Hertford
10. John de Lacy, 1st Earl of Lincoln
5.Maud de Lacy
11. Margaret de Quincy, Countess of Lincoln
1. Elizabeth de Clare
12. Henry III of England
6.Edward I of England
13. Eleanor of Provence
3.Joan of Acre
14. Ferdinand III of Castile
7. Eleanor of Castile
15. Joan, Countess of Ponthieu
