= Richard Óg de Burgh, 2nd Earl of Ulster =

One of the most powerful Irish nobles of the late 13th and early 14th centuries

Richard de Burgh
- 2nd Earl of Ulster
- Arms of de Burgh: Or, a cross gules.
- Coat of arms: Arms of the House of de Burgh.svg
- Tenure: 1271–1326
- Predecessor: Walter de Burgh, 1st Earl of Ulster
- Successor: William Donn de Burgh, 3rd Earl of Ulster
- Other titles: 3rd Baron of Connaught
- Born: 1240; Ireland
- Died: 29 July 1326 (aged 85–86); Athassel Priory, near Cashel, Ireland
- Spouse: Margarite
- Issue: 10, including: Elizabeth, Queen of Scotland; John de Burgh; Edmond de Burgh
- Parents: Walter de Burgh; Aveline FitzJohn

Richard Óg de Burgh, 2nd Earl of Ulster and 3rd Baron of Connaught (English: /dəˈbɜːr/ də-BUR; Latinized to de Burgo; 1240 – 29 July 1326), called The Red Earl, was one of the most powerful Anglo-Norman nobles in Ireland during the late 13th and early 14th centuries and father of Elizabeth, wife of King Robert the Bruce of Scotland.

== Early life ==
Richard's father was Walter de Burgh, 1st Earl of Ulster (of the second creation) and Lord of Connacht, who was the second son of Richard Mór de Burgh, 1st Lord of Connaught and Egidia de Lacy. Richard's mother was Aveline FitzJohn, daughter of Sir John FitzGeoffrey.

"Richard Óg", means "Richard the Young", which may be a reference to his youth when he became earl in 1271, or to differentiate him from his grandfather, Richard Mór.

== Earl of Ulster ==
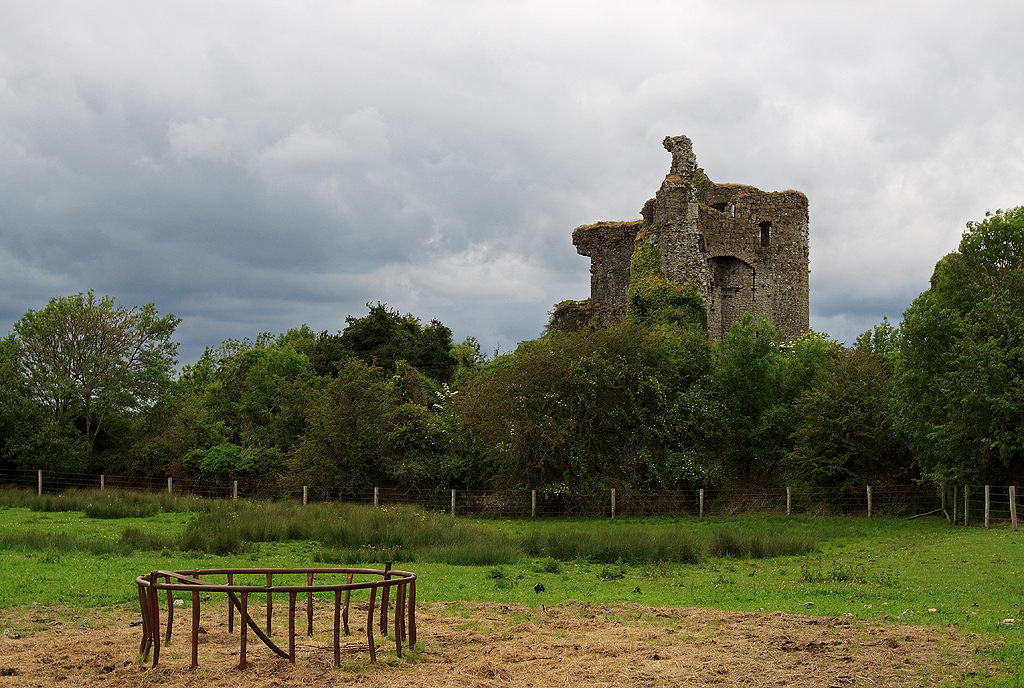
Lea Castle

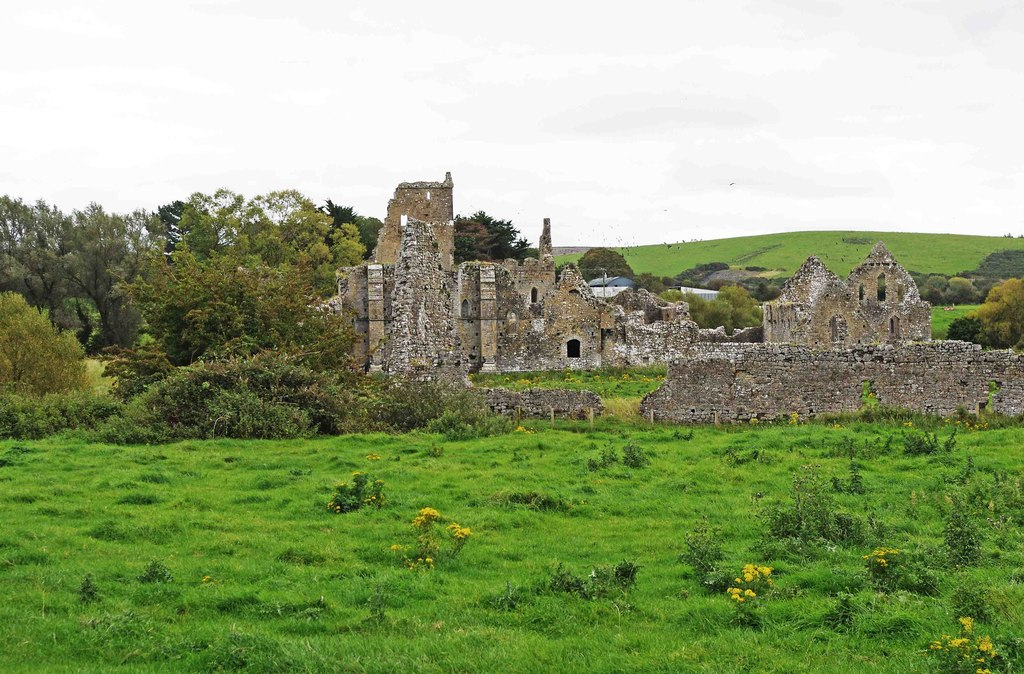
Athassel Priory, where Richard de Burgh is buried

Richard Óg was the most powerful of the de Burgh Earls of Ulster, succeeding his father in Ulster and Connacht upon reaching his majority in 1280. Richard fought in the conquest of Wales in the 1280s, and led vigorous campaigns in Ulster. He was a close friend of King Edward I of England, who summoned him repeatedly to attend him in person in the Scottish wars, and ranked first among the Earls of Ireland. He was subsequently made general of the forces in Ireland during these wars. The earl was occasionally summoned to parliament in England. Richard married Margaret, the daughter of his cousin John de Burgh (also spelt de Borough) and Cecily Baillol.

During his time, the earldom of Ulster enjoyed a period of wealth and prosperity. There were around 150 people in Carrickfergus castle when the earl was in residence. Richard de Burgh’s children married into the most important families in England, Scotland, and the Lordship of Ireland: Robert the Bruce, King of Scots and the Earls of Gloucester, Kildare, Desmond and Louth were his sons-in-law.

He pursued expansionist policies that often left him at odds with fellow Norman lords, in particular the FitzGeralds. In the 1290s he clashed fiercely with John FitzGerald, 1st Earl of Kildare. Matters reached a climax in 1294 when Kildare captured Richard and imprisoned him at Lea Castle for several months "to the disturbance of the whole land". The Parliament of Ireland eventually secured Richard's release and thereafter relations between the two men improved, with Richard's daughter Joan marrying Kildare's son and heir. Kildare, though he received a royal pardon for his actions, was forced to surrender his lands in Connacht to Richard, and proved no threat to Richard's policy of expansion in the longer term.

Richard's daughter Elizabeth became the second wife of King Robert the Bruce of Scotland. However, this did not stop Richard from leading his forces from Ireland to support England's King Edward I in his Scottish campaigns; Edward captured Elizabeth in 1306, but in order to gain the support of Richard, Edward only put Elizabeth under house arrest. When the forces of Edward Bruce invaded Ulster in 1315, the Red Earl led a force against him, but suffered defeat at Connor in Antrim. In 1316, Robert de Nottingham, then Mayor of Dublin, suspicious of the Earl attacked St. Mary's Abbey, Dublin where the Earl was visiting. De Burgh was suspected of having brought Edward Bruce, who was then marching on Dublin, to Ireland. Several of de Burgh's men were killed before he was captured, and as the monks were suspected of supporting Bruce, the abbey was laid waste. The invasion of Bruce and the uprising of Felim McHugh O'Connor in Connacht left Richard virtually without authority in his lands, but O'Connor was killed in 1316 at the Second Battle of Athenry. The result was that Richard was able to recover Ulster after the defeat of Bruce at Faughart in 1318.

Richard died on 29 July 1326 at Athassel Priory, near Cashel, County Tipperary.

== Children and family ==
- Aveline de Burgh (b. c. 1280), married John de Bermingham, 1st Earl of Louth
- Eleanor de Burgh (1282 – aft. August 1324), married Thomas de Multon, 1st Baron Multon of Egremont
- Elizabeth de Burgh (c. 1284 – 26 October 1327), Queen consort of Scotland, married Robert the Bruce as his second wife, and was the mother of David II of Scotland
- Walter de Burgh (c. 1285–1304)
- John de Burgh (c. 1286 – 18 June 1313)
- Maud de Burgh (c. 1288–1320), married Gilbert de Clare, 7th Earl of Hertford
- Thomas de Burgh (c. 1292–1316)
- Katherine de Burgh (c. 1296 – 1 November 1331), married Maurice Fitzgerald, 1st Earl of Desmond
- Edmond de Burgh (b. c. 1298)
- Joan de Burgh (c. 1300 – 23 April 1359), married firstly, Thomas FitzGerald, 2nd Earl of Kildare, by whom she had issue, and secondly, Sir John Darcy, 1st Baron Darcy de Knayth, by whom she had issue, including Elizabeth Darcy who married James Butler, 2nd Earl of Ormond

== Annals of the Four Masters ==
From the Annals of the Four Masters:

M1303.8.A great army was led by the King of England into Scotland; and the Red Earl and many of the Irish and English went with a large fleet from Ireland to his assistance. On this occasion they took many cities, and gained sway over Scotland. Theobald Burke, the Earl's brother, died after his return from this expedition, on Christmas night, at Carrickfergus.

M1304.2. The Countess, wife of Richard Burke, Earl of Ulster, i.e. the Red Earl, and Walter de Burgo, heir of the same Earl, died.

M1305.2. The new castle of Inishowen was erected by the Red Earl.

== Ancestry ==
Ancestors of Richard Óg de Burgh, 2nd Earl of Ulster

8. William de Burgh
4. Richard Mór de Burgh, 1st Baron of Connaught
9. Daughter of Domnall Mór Ua Briain
2. Walter de Burgh, 1st Earl of Ulster
10. Walter de Lacy, Lord of Meath
5. Egidia de Lacy, Lady of Connacht
11. Margaret de Braose, Lady of Trim
1. Richard Óg de Burgh, 2nd Earl of Ulster
12. Geoffrey Fitz Peter, 1st Earl of Essex
6. John Fitzgeoffrey
13. Aveline Fitz Peter, Countess of Essex
3. Aveline FitzGeoffrey
14. Hugh Bigod, 3rd Earl of Norfolk
7. Isabel Bigod
15. Maud Marshal

== See also ==
- House of Burgh, an Anglo-Norman and Hiberno-Norman dynasty founded in 1193
- Lord of Connaught

Peerage of Ireland
Preceded by Walter de Burgh	Earl of Ulster; 1271–1326	Succeeded by William Donn de Burgh
