= John de Burgh (died 1313) =

English nobleman (1286–1313)

- Arms of de Burgh: Or, a cross gules.
- Native name: Sean de Búrca
- Born: 1286
- Died: 18 June 1313 (aged 26–27); Galway
- Noble family: House of Burgh
- Spouse: Elizabeth de Clare (m. 1308)
- Issue: William de Burgh, 3rd Earl of Ulster
- Father: Richard Óg de Burgh, 2nd Earl of Ulster
- Mother: Margaret de Burgh

John de Burgh (English: /dəˈbɜːr/ də-BUR; 1286 – 18 June 1313) was an Irish noble who was the son of Richard Óg de Burgh, 2nd Earl of Ulster and his mother was, Margarite.

== Background ==
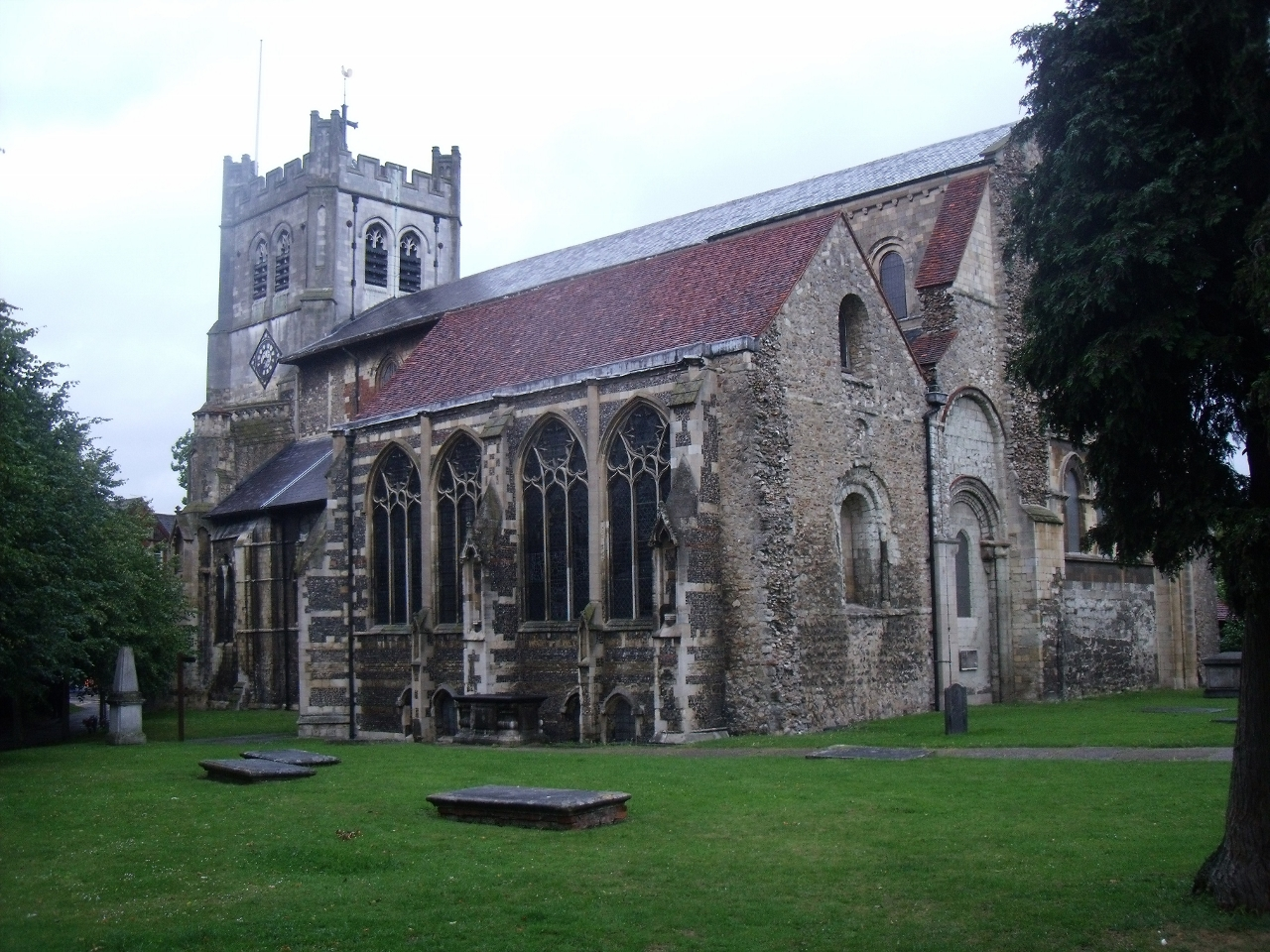
Waltham Abbey Church, Essex

Heir apparent to the Earldom of Ulster, he married (as her first husband) in Waltham Abbey, Essex, on 30 September 1308, Elizabeth de Clare, sister of Gilbert de Clare, 7th Earl of Hertford and 8th Earl of Gloucester. She was the founder of Clare College, Cambridge, and a granddaughter of King Edward I. Gloucester in turn married John's sister Maud.

== Family ==
John and Elizabeth had one son:

- William Donn de Burgh, 3rd Earl of Ulster (1312–1333)

However, John died in Galway the next year, leaving his infant son William heir to the Earldom.

== Ancestry ==
Ancestors of John de Burgh (died 1313)

8. Richard Mór de Burgh, 1st Baron of Connaught
4. Walter de Burgh, 1st Earl of Ulster
9. Egidia de Lacy, Lady of Connacht
2. Richard Óg de Burgh, 2nd Earl of Ulster
10. John Fitzgeoffrey
5. Aveline FitzGeoffrey
11. Isabel Bigod
1. John de Burgh
Hubert de Burgh, Earl of Kent
6. Sir John de Burgh
Beatrice de Warrenne
3. Margaret de Burgh
7. Hawise of Lanvaley

== See also ==
- House of Burgh, an Anglo-Norman and Hiberno-Norman dynasty founded in 1193
- Lord of Connaught
