= House of Burgh =

Ancient Anglo-Norman dynasty

Burgh
- Arms: de Burgh (Burke); Blazon: Or, a cross gules
- Country: Normandy; Kingdom of England; Lordship of Ireland; Kingdom of Ireland; Kingdom of Scotland; Kingdom of Great Britain; United Kingdom; Kingdom of Spain; Confederate Ireland; Republic of Ireland
- Founded: 1193; 833 years ago
- Founder: William de Burgh
- Current head: The Earl of Mayo
- Titles: List: Mac William Íochtar; Mac William Uachtar; Earl of Clanricarde; Lord of Connaught; Marquess of Clanricarde; Marquess of Sligo; Earl of Ulster; Earl of Kent; Earl of Clanricarde; Earl of Mayo; Earl of St Albans; Viscount Tunbridge; Viscount Mayo; Viscount Burke; Baron Fermoy; Baron Burgh; Baron Ardenerie; Baron Connemara; Baron Bourke; Lord of Connaught; Baron Leitrim; Baron Downes; Baron Strabolgi; Burke Baronets; Kings and Queens of Thomond; de Burgo Baronets; Kings and Queens of England; Kings and Queens of England and Ireland; Kings and Queens of Scots; Kings and Queens of Great Britain and Ireland
- Traditions: Catholicism
- Motto: Un Roy, Une Foy, Une Loy
- Heirlooms: List: Book of the de Burgos
- Estate: List: Portumna Castle; Somerhill House; Derryinver; Palmerstown House
- Dissolution: 1363 (Original line); 1916 (Clanricarde line)
- Cadet branches: List: Agnatic; Clanricarde; Marquess of Clanricarde; Mac William Íochtar; Earl of Mayo; Viscount Mayo; Earl of Ulster; Baron Bourke; Baron Leitrim; Baron Downes; Burke Baronets; de Burgo Baronets; Cognatic; Dál gCais (Ireland); House of Bruce (Scotland); House of York (England); Earl of Harewood; Baron Burgh; Hussey de Burgh; Baron Strabolgi; Baron Fermoy

The House of Burgh (English: /bɜːr/; ber; French pronunciation: [buʁ]), also known by the family names of Burke and Bourke (Irish: de Búrca), is an Irish family, descending from the Anglo-Norman de Burgh dynasty, who played a prominent role in the Anglo-Norman invasion of Ireland, where they settled and attained the earldoms of Kent, Ulster, Clanricarde, and Mayo at various times, and they have provided queens consort of Scotland and Thomond and Kings of England via a matrilineal line. The original (Ulster) line became extinct in 1363, along with the Clanricarde line in 1916, though the Mayo line is represented by the current Earl of Mayo.

The patriarch of the de Burgh family in Ireland was William de Burgh, the elder brother of Hubert de Burgh, Earl of Kent, who was Regent of England (and believed to be the ancestor of the Lords Burgh). William's descendants included the Lords of Connaught (Connacht), the Earls of Ulster and Clanricarde. His great-great-granddaughter, Elizabeth married King Robert I of Scots. Another descendant, Elizabeth, became the wife of King Edward III's son Lionel of Antwerp, 1st Duke of Clarence, via whom they are ancestors of the Yorkist Plantagenet Kings of England; and through Edward IV's eldest daughter, Elizabeth, they are ancestors of the reigning British royal family.

== Forebears ==
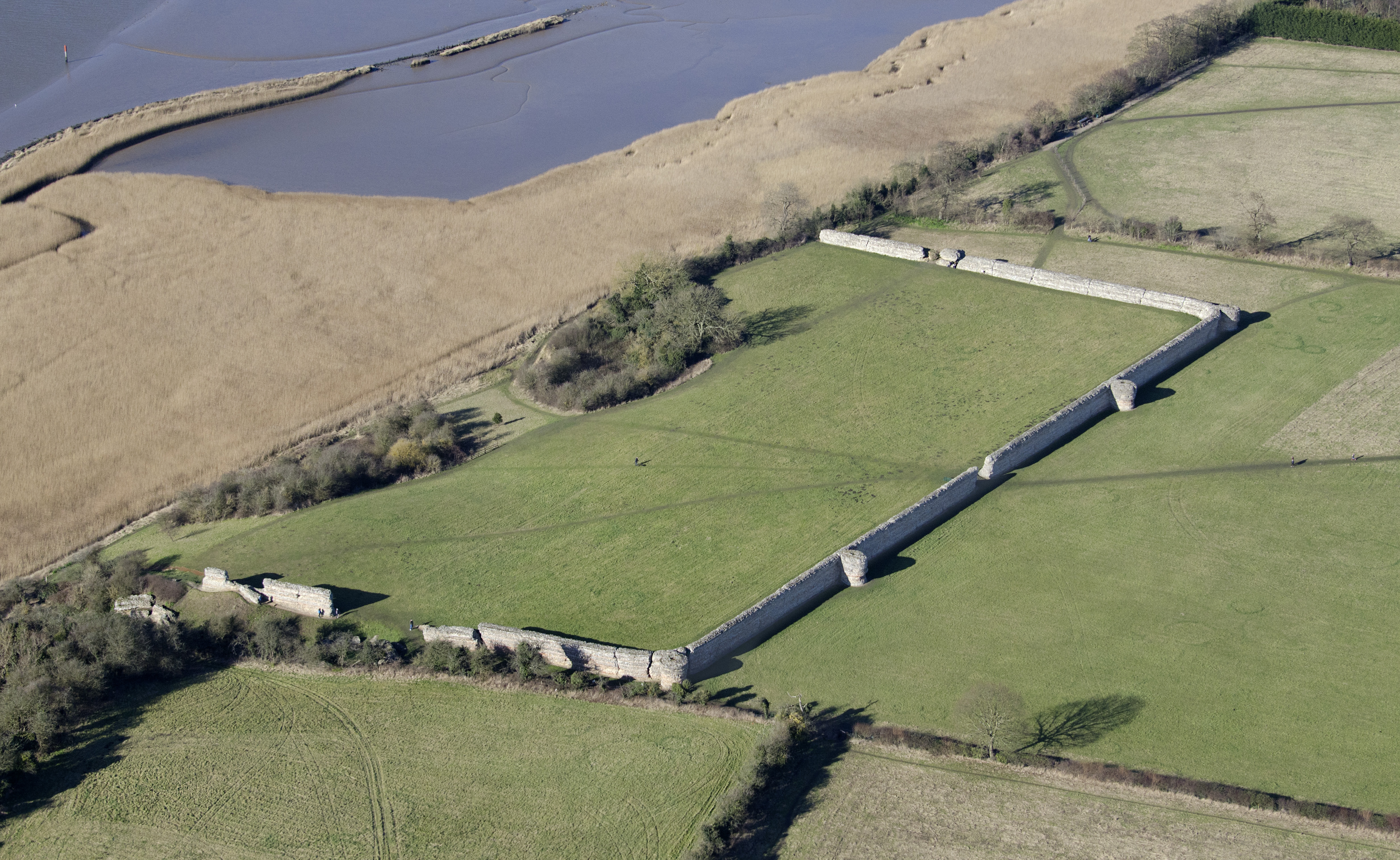
Ancient Burgh Castle (Roman fortification)

In the later 12th and early 13th centuries, the de Burghs were led by four brothers:

- William de Burgh (c. 1160–1205/6), who played a major role in the Anglo-Norman invasion of Ireland and gave rise to one of the most prominent Anglo-Irish families of the later Middle Ages. His direct descendants still carry his surname (and its variants) today;
- Hubert de Burgh (c. 1170–before 1243), who served as Chief Justiciar and Regent of England, Justiciar of Ireland, and was created Earl of Kent. His descendants changed their name to 'Burgh' after the Civil War in the seventeenth century;
- Thomas de Burgh, who became Castellan of Norwich;
- Geoffrey de Burgh (c. 1180–1228), who became Bishop of Ely.

== Descendants of Hubert de Burgh, Earl of Kent ==
=== Hubert de Burgh ===
The grant of the Earldom of Kent to Hubert de Burgh was limited to himself and any male heirs born to his final wife, Princess Margaret of Scotland, but their only child was a daughter who was herself childless. Though the earldom of Kent became extinct on Hubert's death, his sons from a previous marriage, John and Hubert, inherited his lands and their descendants passed into relative obscurity until 1487, when Thomas Burgh (c.1431–1496) of Gainsborough, Lincolnshire (thought to be descended from Hubert, Earl of Kent's younger son Hubert) was summoned to Parliament as Baron Burgh (or Borough) of Gainsborough, though he never took his seat and the creation of this barony is therefore disputed.

=== Barons Burgh (1529–1602) ===
Thomas Burgh's son, Sir Edward Burgh (c.1463–1528), did not sit in Parliament. However, his son, Thomas Burgh (c.1488–1550), was summoned to Parliament in 1529 and this was deemed as the creation of the barony. In this barony, Thomas, 3rd Baron Burgh was Lord Deputy of Ireland (1597), and his younger brother, Sir John Burgh (d. 1594), was a distinguished soldier and sailor. Robert, 6th Baron Burgh died as a young child in 1602, and the barony fell into abeyance among his four sisters.

== Descendants of William de Burgh (d. 1206) ==
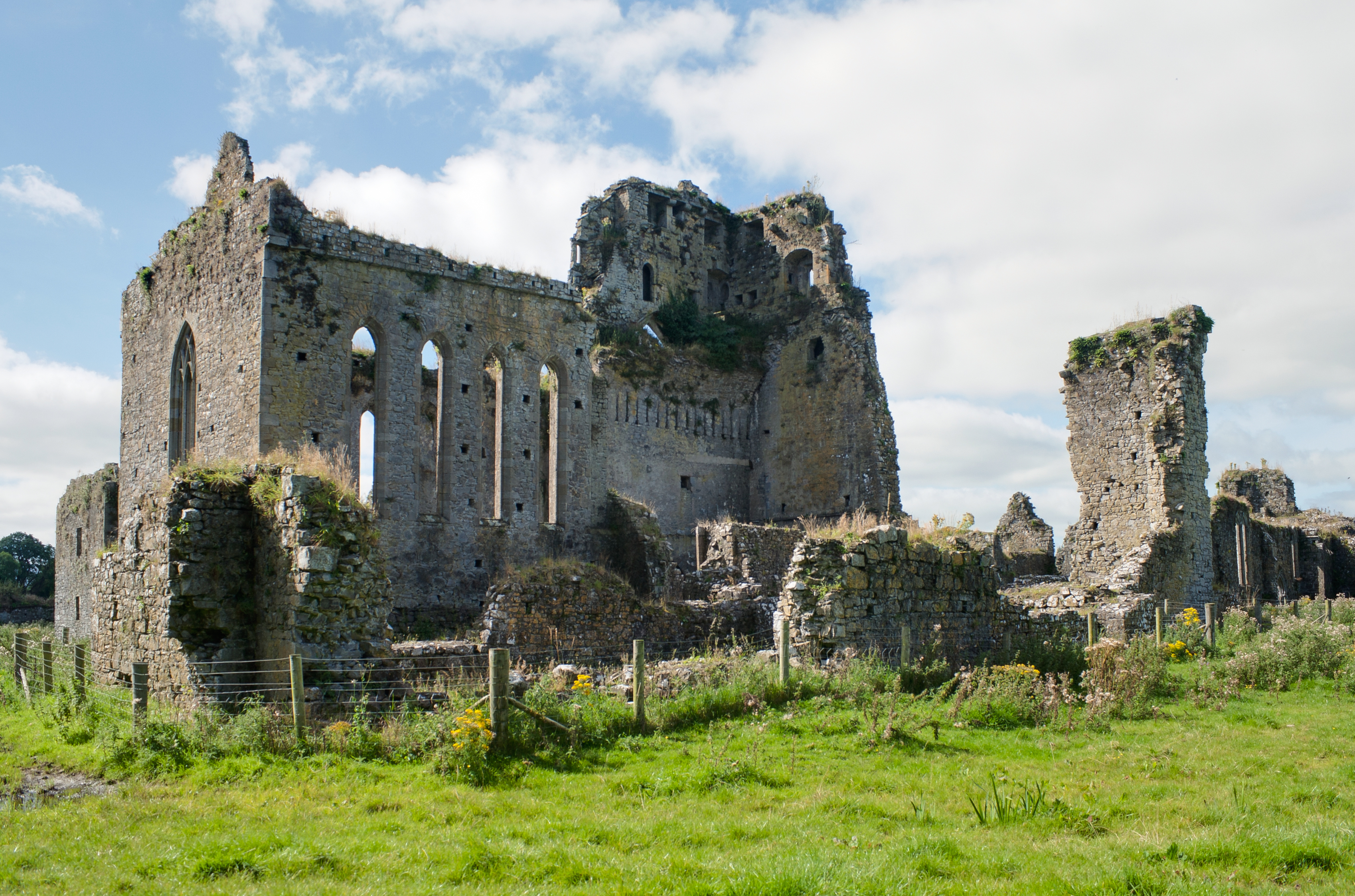
The Choir and Tower of Athassel Priory, founded by William de Burgh

=== William de Burgh ===
The Anglo-Norman adventurer, William de Burgh (c. 1160–1205/6), arrived in Ireland in 1185 with Prince John. He received a grant of lands from King Henry II. At John's accession (1199) he was installed in Thomond and became Governor of Limerick. Between 1199 and 1201 he was supporting, in turn, Cathal Carrach and Cathal Crovderg for the native throne, but William was expelled from Connacht after a battle with Crovderg over payment for him and his army. He did later return and defeat Crovderg, however, who though remaining as king, swore loyalty to de Burgh. William married a daughter of Domnall Mór Ó Briain (O'Brien), King of Thomond, King of Limerick, and claimant to the Kingdom of Munster (a descendant of Brian Boru and the O'Brien dynasty).

=== Lords of Connacht (1227–1264) ===
William's son, Richard Mór de Burgh, 1st Lord of Connacht (c.1194–1242/3), received the land of "Connok" (Connacht) as forfeited by its king, whom he helped to fight (1227). He was Justiciar of Ireland (1228–32). In 1234, he sided with the crown against Richard, Earl Marshal, who fell in battle against him. Richard Mór's eldest son, Sir Richard de Burgh (d. 1248) succeeded him, briefly, as Lord of Connacht.

=== Earls of Ulster (1264–1363) ===
Coat of arms of Edward, 4th Duke of York, before becoming King Edward IV

Richard Mór's second son, Walter de Burgh (c.1210–71), continued warfare against the native chieftains and added greatly to his vast domains by obtaining, from Prince Edward, a grant of "the county of Ulster" (c. 1255) in consequence of which he was styled later Earl of Ulster.

Walter, 1st Earl of Ulster was succeeded by his son, Richard Óg de Burgh, 2nd Earl of Ulster. In 1286, he ravaged and subdued Connacht, and deposed the chief native king, (Brian O'Neill), substituting his own nominee. He also attacked the native king of Connacht, in favour of the branch of O'Conors that his family supported. He led his forces from Ireland to support Edward I in his Scottish campaigns, and on Edward Bruce's invasion of Ulster (1315), Richard marched against him, despite having given his daughter, Elizabeth, in marriage (c. 1304) to King Robert I of Scotland, Edward's older brother. Occasionally summoned to English parliaments, Richard spent most of his forty years of activity in Ireland, where he was the greatest noble of his day, usually fighting the natives or his Anglo-Norman rivals to expand his family's land. The patent roll of 1290 shows that in addition to his lands in Ulster, Connacht and Munster, he held the Isle of Man, but later surrendered it to the king.

Richard, the 2nd Earl's grandson and successor was William Donn de Burgh, the Brown Earl (1312–33), son of John de Burgh (d. 1313) and Elizabeth, Lady of Clare (d. 1360), sister and co-heir of the last Clare Earl of Hertford (d. 1314). William Donn married Maud of Lancaster (daughter of Henry, 3rd Earl of Lancaster) and was appointed Lieutenant of Ireland (1331), but was murdered in his 21st year, leaving his only daughter, Elizabeth de Burgh, as the sole heiress not only of the de Burgh possessions but of the vast Clare estates.

Elizabeth was married in childhood to Lionel, 1st Duke of Clarence (third son of Edward III) who was recognized in her right as Earl of Ulster. It is from them that the Yorkist Plantagenets later derived their claim to the throne of England. Their descendant, Edward, 4th Duke of York, ascended the throne in 1461 as King Edward IV of England, since then the Earldom of Ulster has been only held by members of the British royal family.

=== Elizabeth, Queen of Scots ===
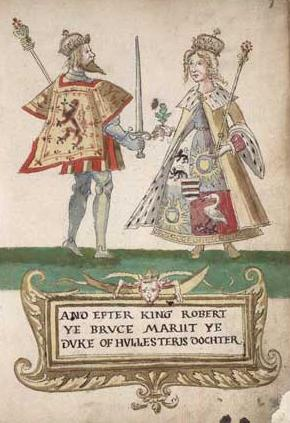
Robert the Bruce and Elizabeth de Burgh, King and Queen of Scots, as depicted in the Seton Armorial

Elizabeth de Burgh, daughter of Richard Óg de Burgh, 2nd Earl of Ulster, married Robert the Bruce in 1302 at the age of 13. The wedding most likely took place at Writtle, near Chelmsford, Essex and was arranged by either Richard or Edward I, King Edward having heavily encouraged it as a way to keep the loyalty of the Scottish nobility.

However, the Bruce would soon be separated from his English allies upon the murder of John Comyn, his greatest rival for the Scottish throne, in the "Chapel of the Greyfriars". Aware that he would be excommunicated for killing someone inside a church, Robert rushed to Scone before a papal bull could be issued, 6 weeks later being crowned as Robert I, King of Scots with Elizabeth by his side as his consort.

They had four children including David II, King of Scots, who himself would go on to become King of Scots in 1329.

=== Burke Civil War (1333–1338) ===
On the murder of William Donn de Burgh, 3rd Earl of Ulster (d.1333), his male kinsmen (who had a better right to the succession than his daughter, according to native Irish ideas), adopting Irish names and customs, became virtually native chieftains and succeeded in holding the bulk of the de Burgh territories. After the fourteenth century, some branches of this Anglo-Irish family gaelicised their surname in Irish as de Búrca which gradually became Búrc then later Burke or Bourke, and these surnames and their variants have been associated with Connacht for more than seven centuries. Some branches returned to their original surname of 'de Burgh' in the eighteenth century.

The family's two main branches were:

- Mac William Uachtar (Upper Mac William) or Clanricarde (in southern Connacht and Galway).
- Mac William Íochtar (Lower Mac William) in northern Connacht (Mayo).

=== Burke/de Burgh of Mac William Uachtar (Earls and Marquesses of Clanricarde) ===
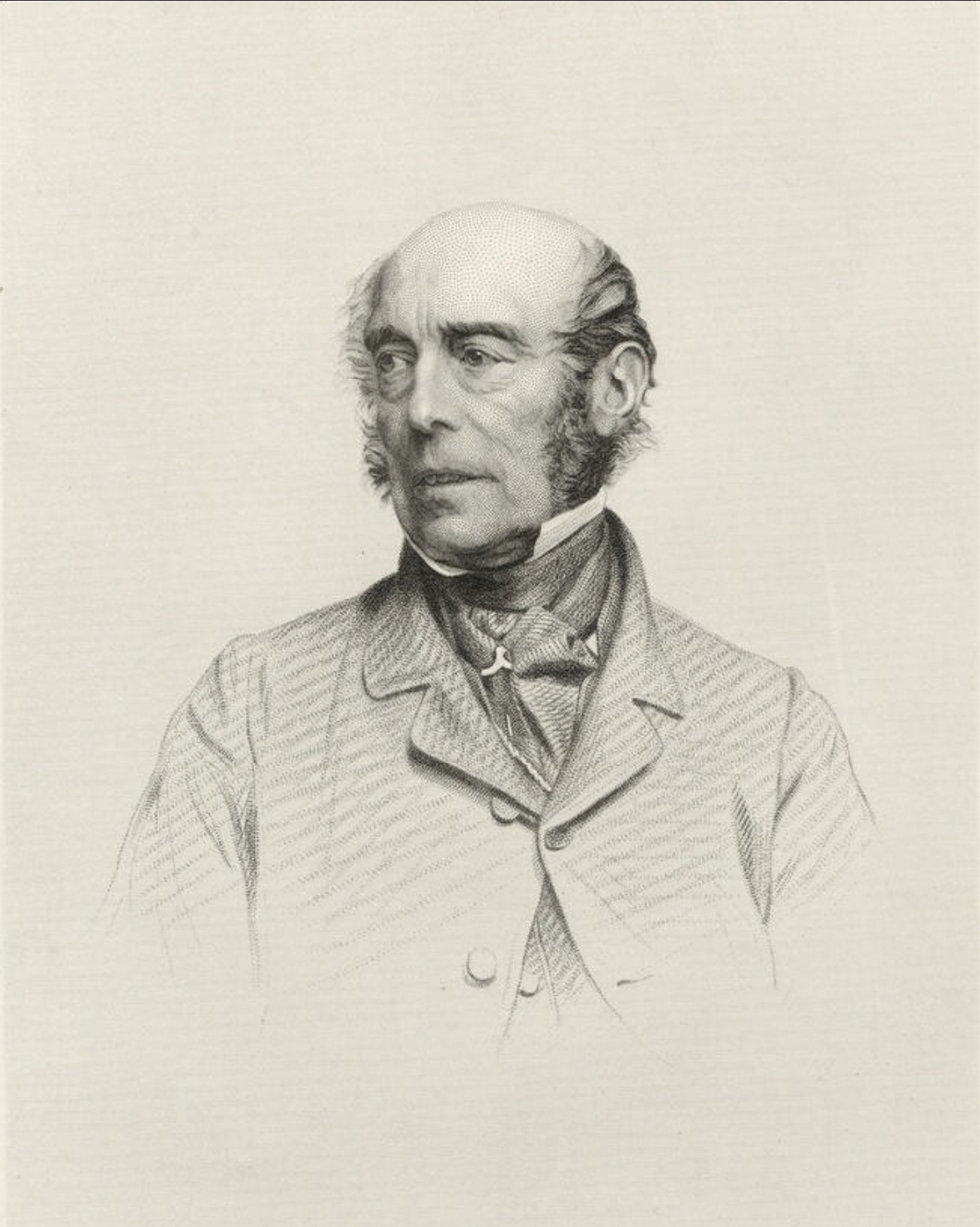
Ulick de Burgh, 1st Marquess of Clanricarde

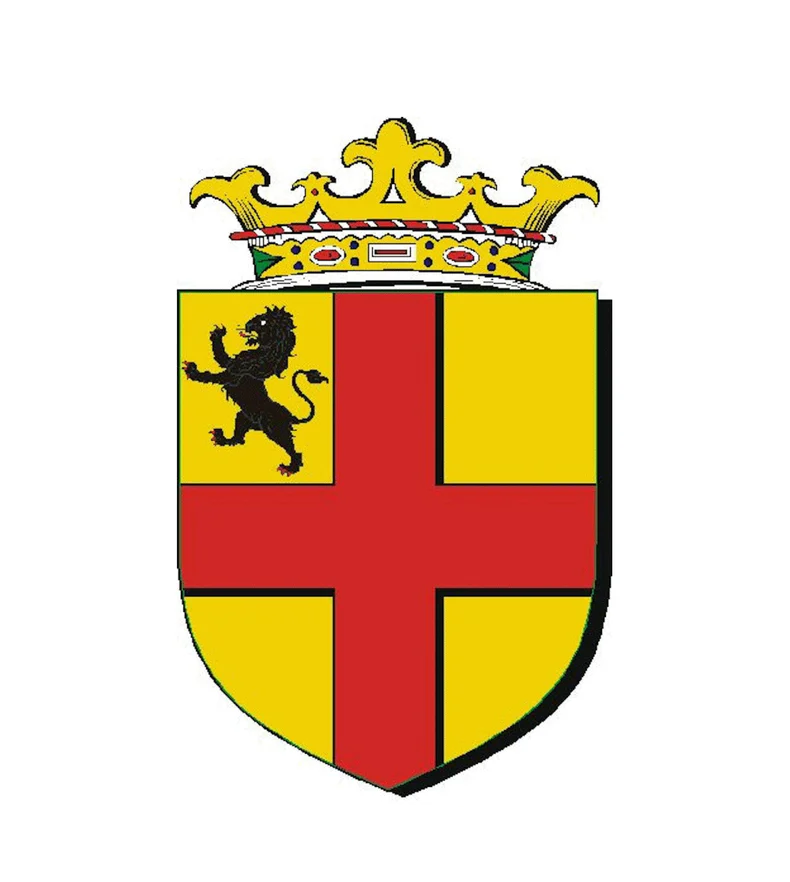
Clanricarde coat of arms

The Gaelic title Mac William Uachtar (meaning "son of the upper William (de Burgh)") came to denote the head of the Burke family of Upper or south Connacht but the chief of this family was more popularly known by another Gaelic title, Clanricarde (meaning "(head of) Richard's family"). In 1543, the Mac William Uachtar (Upper Mac William) chief, Ulick na gCeann Burke (alias, MacWilliam) surrendered his lands in Connacht to Henry VIII, receiving these properties back to hold them, by English custom, as Earl of Clanricarde and Lord Dunkellin (1543).

Ulick's descendant, Richard Burke, 4th Earl of Clanricarde distinguished himself on the English side in O'Neill's Rebellion and afterwards obtained the English Earldom of St Albans (1628). His son, Ulick Burke, received the Irish Marquessate of Clanricarde (first creation, 1646). His cousin and heir, Richard Burke, 6th Earl of Clanricarde was an uncle of Richard Burke, 8th Earl and John Burke, 9th Earl, both of whom fought for James II and paid the penalty for doing so (1691), but the latter was restored (1702), and his great-grandson, Henry de Burgh, 12th Earl, was created Marquess of Clanricarde (second creation, 1789). Henry left no son, but his brother, John de Burgh, 13th Earl was created Earl of Clanricarde (second creation, 1800) and the Marquessate was later revived (1825), for John's son, Ulick de Burgh, 14th and 2nd Earl. His heir, Hubert de Burgh-Canning was the 2nd and last Marquess. The Earldom of Clanricarde (second creation) passed by special remainder to the 6th Marquess of Sligo. This family, which changed its name from Burke to de Burgh (1752) and added that of Canning (1862), owned a vast estate in County Galway.

=== Bourke of Mac William Íochtar (Viscounts Mayo and Earls of Mayo) ===
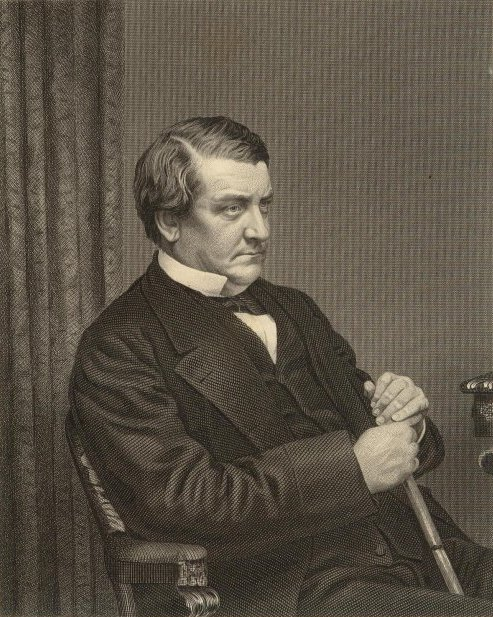
Richard Bourke, 6th Earl of Mayo

Mac William Íochtar coat of arms

The Gaelic title Mac William Íochtar (meaning "son of the lower William (de Burgh)") came to denote the head of the Bourke family of lower or north Connacht. Seaán mac Oliver Bourke, 17th (Lord of) Mac William Íochtar was created Baron Ardenerie in 1580. Tibbot (Theobald) MacWalter Kittagh Bourke, 21st (Lord of) Mac William Íochtar, fled to Spain where he was created Marquess of Mayo (1602) in the Spanish peerage.

In 1603, the 19th Lord of Mac William Íochtar, Tiobóid na Long (Theobald) Bourke (d. 1629), resigned his territories in Mayo, and received them back to hold them by English tenure and was later created Viscount Mayo (1627). Miles, 2nd Viscount (d. 1649) and Theobald, 3rd Viscount (d. 1652) suffered at Cromwell's hands, but Theobald, 4th Viscount was restored to his estates (some 50,000 acres) in 1666. The peerage became extinct or dormant on the death of John, 8th Viscount (1767).

In 1781, John Bourke, was created Viscount Mayo (1781) and later Earl of Mayo (1785). He was descended from the fourth son of Sir Thomas Bourke (d. 1397), whose second son, Edmund, was the ancestor of the Viscounts Mayo of the first creation. The first Earl's great-grandson, Richard Bourke, 6th Earl of Mayo, was appointed Viceroy of India in 1869 and was murdered in the Andaman Islands in 1872. His younger brother was the politician Robert Bourke, 1st Baron Connemara who became Governor of Madras.

The baronies of Bourke of Castleconnell (1580) and Bourke of Brittas (1618), both forfeited in 1691, were bestowed on branches of the family which still has representatives in the baronetage and landed gentry of Ireland.

== Arms (Heraldry) ==
=== Hubert de Burgh, Earl of Kent ===
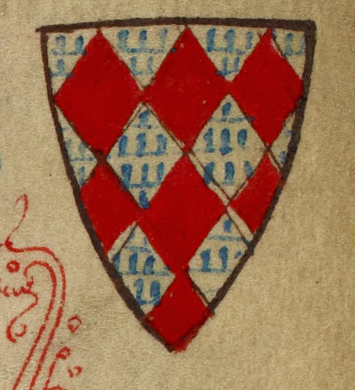
The Arms of Hubert de Burgh, Earl of Kent

Clarence Ellis noted that there were three known versions of Hubert de Burgh's arms: (1) Lozengy Gules and Vair; (2) Masculy Vair and Gules (as given in the Grimaldy Roll of c. 1350); and (3) Gules seven Mascles 3:3 and 1 Vair.

=== William de Burgh ===
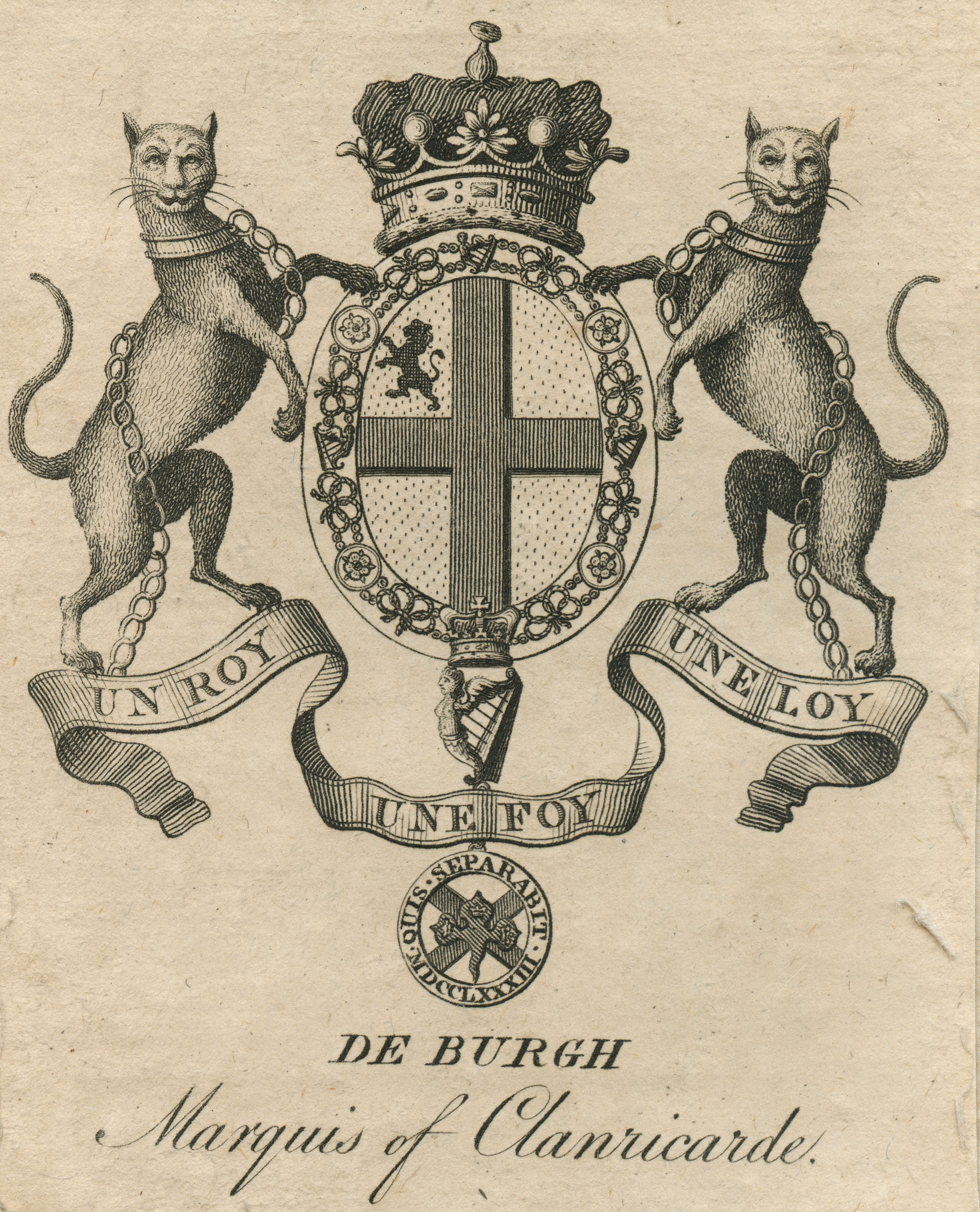
The Arms of Ulick John de Burgh, 1st Marquess of Clanricarde (1802–1874), Knight of St Patrick (1831)

The original de Burgh coat of arms was adopted during the beginnings of the age of heraldry in the thirteenth century. It was blazoned as Or, a cross gules (a red cross on a gold shield). According to attributed legend, the arms originated during the Crusades while an ancestor of the de Burghs was fighting for King Richard the Lionheart. Given that this ancestor did not yet have a crest of his own, he carried a plain gold shield and it is said that, following a successful battle, the Lionheart marked a cross of blood on his shield stating "for your bravery, this shall be your crest". Origin stories such as this were attributed to noble and Royal families at the time with questionable historicity.

However, at a time when heraldry was only beginning to be established, these arms were identical with those of the Bigods, the ruling family of Norfolk. The Bigod arms had been adopted by Roger Bigod, 2nd Earl of Norfolk (d.1221) in the early thirteenth century but his great-grandson Roger Bigod, 5th Earl of Norfolk (d.1306) ceased using these arms after 1269. Glover's Roll, a sixteenth-century copy of a roll of arms of the 1250s, includes a depiction of the Or, a cross Gules of the Earl of Norfolk. The de Burgh claim to these arms may have been linked to the fact that Richard Óg de Burgh, 2nd Earl of Ulster was the son of Aveline FitzJohn (d.1274), daughter of Sir John FitzGeoffrey (d.1258) and his wife Isabel Bigod (c. 1212–1250), daughter of Hugh Bigod, 3rd Earl of Norfolk (c. 1182–1225).

Variations on this original shield were adopted by different branches of the family. For instance, the arms of the Burke/de Burgh family of Clanricarde added a black lion to the upper-left quadrant (Or, a cross gules in the first quarter a lion rampant sable). Another Burke family added a fleur-de-llys to the cross (Or, on a cross gules a fleur-de-llys of the first), and the arms of the Burkes or Bourkes, Viscounts Mayo, was Party per fess Or and Ermine, a cross gules the first quarter charged with a lion rampant sable and the second with a dexter hand couped at the wrist and erect gules.

The crest is a seated and chained 'mountain cat'. The motto has varied between A Cruce Salus (Latin: 'Salvation from the Cross'), which would have originated in the Crusades, and Un Roy, Une Foy, Une Loy (archaic French: 'One King, One Faith, One Law').

== Genealogy ==
de Burgh Genealogy: Lords of Connacht, Earls of Ulster and Earls of Kent

Walter de Burgh of Burgh Castle, Norfolk m. Alice
William de Burgh (d. 1206)	Geoffrey de Burgh; Bishop of Ely (d. 1228)	Hubert de Burgh; 1st Earl of Kent; Regent of England (d. before 1243)	Thomas de Burgh; Castellan of Norwich
Richard Mór / Óge de Burgh; Lord of Connacht (d. 1242/3)	Hubert de Burgh; Bishop of Limerick (d. 1250)	William de Burgh; Sheriff of Connacht	John de Burgh	Hubert de Burgh
Sir Richard de Burgh; Constable of Montgomery Castle (d. 1248)	Walter de Burgh; Lord of Connacht; 1st Earl of Ulster (d. 1271)	Sir William Óg de Burgh; Anglo-Irish Noble and Warrior (d. 1270)	Barons Burgh of Gainsborough; 15th century
Richard Óg de Burgh; Lord of Connacht; 2nd Earl of Ulster (1259–1326)	de Burgh/Burkes of Mayo (Mac William Íochtar)	de Burgh / Burke of Galway (Mac William Uachtar/ Clanricarde)
Elizabeth de Burgh; Queen of Scots (c.1289–1327) m. Robert I King of Scots	John de Burgh (1286–1313)	Sir Edmond de Burgh (1298–1338)
William Donn de Burgh; Lord of Connacht; 3rd Earl of Ulster (1312–33)	de Burgh / Burke of ClanWilliam
Elizabeth de Burgh; 4th Countess of Ulster (1332–63) m. Lionel; Duke of Clarence

== See also ==
- Irish nobility
- The Book of the Burkes, or Book of the de Burgos (1580s), Gaelic illuminated manuscript
- Richard Mór de Burgh, first lord of Connacht
- Viscount Galway, viscountcy created in the Peerage of Ireland in 1628 and 1687
- Baron Leitrim, barony created in the Peerage of Ireland
- Burke Baronets of Glinsk and Marble Hill, Galway, created in the Baronetage of Ireland in 1628 and 1797
- Mac William Uachtar/Clanricarde, the Burke clan of Galway
- Mac William Íochtar, the Bourke clan of Mayo
- Burke's Peerage, British account of nobility and genealogical publisher, first published in 1826 by John Burke
- Burke's Landed Gentry, British account of families of the land-holding class, first published in 1833 by John Burke
- Edmund Burke (1729–1797), Irish statesman, economist, and philosopher
- de Burgh (surname), list of people with this surname
- Burke (surname), list of people with this surname
- Bourke (surname), list of people with this surname
