= Walter de Burgh, 1st Earl of Ulster =

Anglo-Irish noble (c. 1210 – 1271)

Walter de Burgh
- 1st Earl of Ulster
- Arms of de Burgh: Or, a cross gules.
- Tenure: 1264–1271
- Predecessor: Richard Mór de Burgh, 1st Lord of Connaught
- Successor: Richard Óg de Burgh, 2nd Earl of Ulster
- Native name: Walter de Búrca
- Other titles: 2nd Lord of Connaught
- Born: c. 1210
- Died: 28 July 1271; Galway
- Spouses: Lady Maud de Lacy (1264); Aveline FitzJohn Fitzgeoffrey
- Issue: Richard Óg de Burgh; Theobald de Burgh; William de Burgh; Thomas de Burgh; Egidia de Burgh
- Parents: Richard Mór de Burgh, 1st Lord of Connaught; Egidia de Lacy

Walter de Burgh, 1st Earl of Ulster, 2nd Lord of Connaught (English: /dəˈbɜːr/ də-BUR; c. 1210 – 28 July 1271), was an Irish peer from the House of Burgh.

== Biography ==
De Burgh was the second son of Richard Mór de Burgh, 1st Lord of Connaught and Egidia de Lacy.

In 1243, he succeeded his father as Lord of Connacht. In a royal order from Westminster in September 1247, Sir John Fitzgeoffrey was charged by the King Henry III with seizing the lands of Walter de Burgh's older brother Richard, who had died. The de Burgh lands in Connaught were being held by John de Livet, likely the son of Gilbert de Lyvet, one of the earliest Lord Mayors of Dublin and Marmaduke de Eschales (Scales).

The traditional account that Walter de Burgh became earl of Ulster through marriage to a cousin is no longer generally accepted. Upon the death of Hugh de Lacy, the 1st Earl of Ulster, in 1242 the earldom reverted to the crown. In 1263, De Burgh was created the 1st Earl of Ulster by King Edward I.

In 1270, he and Walter de Ufford, the Justiciar of Ireland, were defeated by Aedh mac Felim Ua Conchobair at Áth an Chip.

He married Avelina, daughter of Sir John Fitzgeoffrey, Justiciar of Ireland, about 1257.

He died, aged about 60, in Galway, and was succeeded by his eldest son, Richard Óg de Burgh, 2nd Earl of Ulster ('The Red Earl of Ulster'). Other children were four sons, Theobald, Walter, William and Thomas, and a daughter, Egidia, who married Sir Seamus (James) Stewart (1260–1309), 5th High Steward of Scotland.

== Ancestry ==
Ancestors of Walter de Burgh, 1st Earl of Ulster

8. Walter de Burgh?
4. William de Burgh
9. Alice?
2. Richard Mór de Burgh, 1st Baron of Connaught
10. Domnall Mór Ua Briain
5. Daughter
11. Orlacan
1. Walter de Burgh, 1st Earl of Ulster
12. Hugh de Lacy, Lord of Meath
6. Walter de Lacy, Lord of Meath
13. Rohese of Monmouth
3. Egidia de Lacy, Lady of Connacht
14. William de Braose, 4th Lord of Bramber
7. Margaret de Braose, Lady of Trim
15. Maud de Braose

== See also ==
- House of Burgh, an Anglo-Norman and Hiberno-Norman dynasty founded in 1193
- Lord of Connaught

Walter de Burgh, 1st Earl of Ulster de Burgh Born: c. 1230 Died: 28 July 1271
Peerage of Ireland
New creation	Earl of Ulster; 1264–1271	Succeeded by Richard Óg de Burgh
