= De Búrca =

de Búrca
- Blazon: Or, a cross gules
- Pronunciation: Irish: [də ˈbuːɾˠkə] English: /də ˈbʊrkə/
- Language: Irish

Origin
- Language: French
- Derivation: de Burgh
- Meaning: "of the borough"
- Region of origin: England, Ireland

Other names
- Variant forms: de Bourgh, Burgo/de Burgo
- Anglicisation: Burgh
- Derivatives: Burke, Bourke

de Búrca (English: de Burgh; Latin: de Burgo; also Búrc, Bourke and Burke) is an Irish Anglo-Norman surname deriving from the ancient Anglo-Norman and Hiberno-Norman noble dynasty, the House of Burgh. In Ireland, the descendants of William de Burgh (c.1160–1206) had the surname de Burgh which was gaelicised in Irish as de Búrca and over the centuries became Búrc then Burke and Bourke.

Notable people with this name include:

== Surname ==
=== A ===
- Aoife de Búrca (1885–1974), born Eva Burke, Red Cross nurse during the Irish Easter Rising

=== D ===
- David de Burca or David de Burgh, 15th Mac William Iochtar (alive 1537), Irish chieftain and noble
- Déirdre de Búrca (born 1963), Irish Green Party politician who served as a Senator in the Seanad Éireann (2007–2010)

=== E ===
- Edmond de Burca or Edmond de Burgh, 12th Mac William Iochtar (died 1527), Irish chieftain and noble
- Edmund na Féasóige de Burca or Edmund de Burgh, 4th Mac William Iochtar (died 1458), Irish chieftain and noble

=== G ===
- Gráinne de Búrca (born 1966), Irish legal scholar

=== M ===
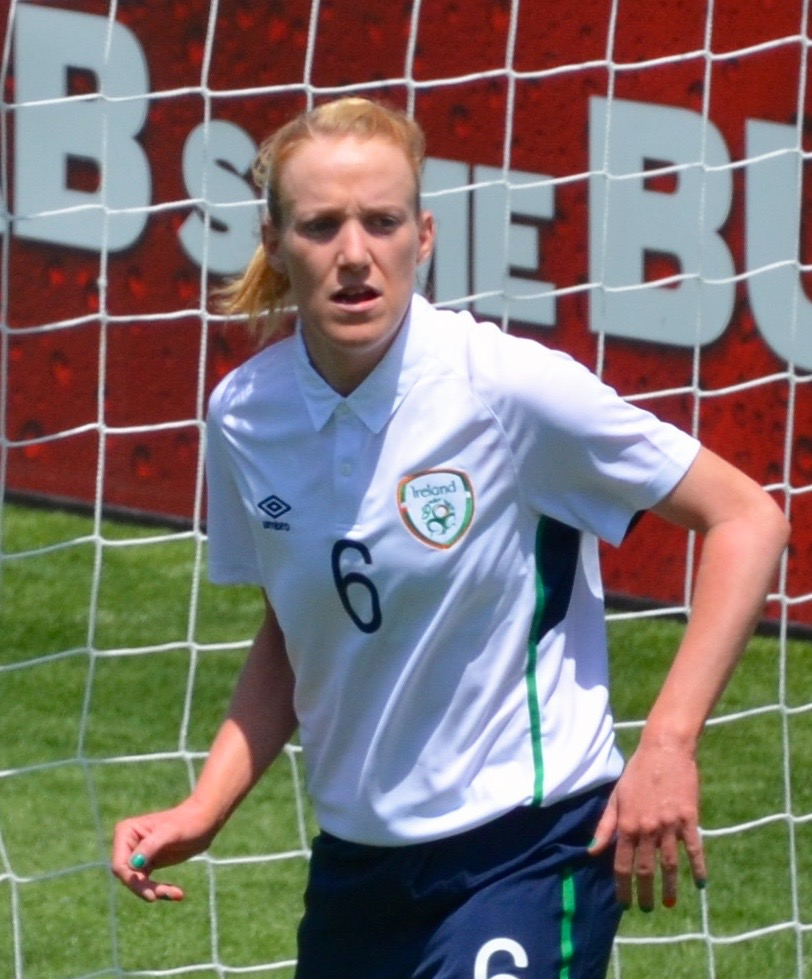
Footballer Méabh de Búrca

- Máirín de Burca (born 1938), Irish writer, journalist and activist
- Méabh de Búrca (born 1988), Irish footballer
- Micheál de Búrca or Michael Bourke (1912–1985), Irish artist and Director of the National College of Art and Design, Ireland

=== N ===
- Nan Tom Teaimín de Búrca, Irish traditional sean-nós singer
- Niamh de Búrca, Irish traditional and folk singer

=== P ===
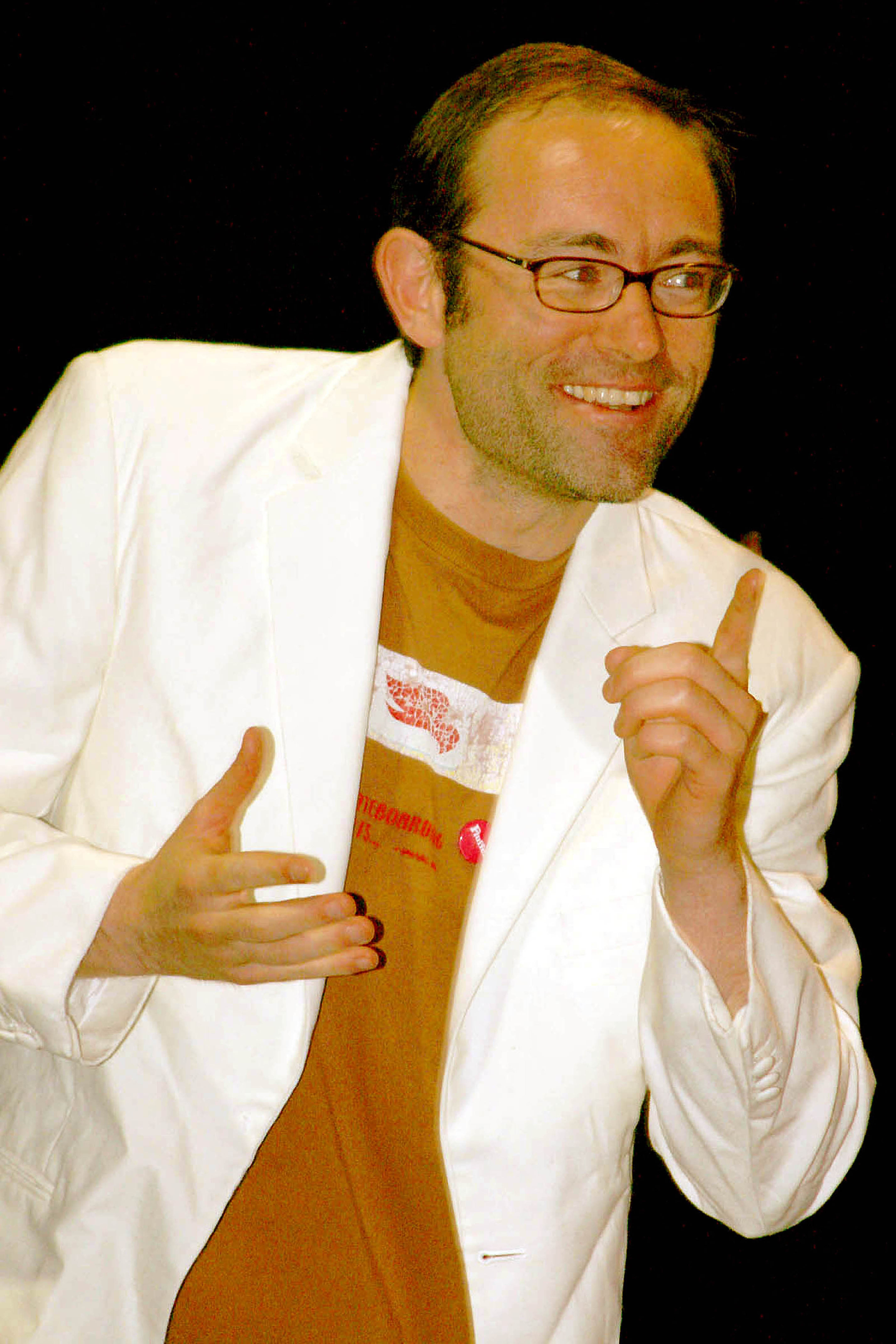
Actor Peadar de Burca

- Peadar de Burca, Irish actor, playwright and comedian

=== R ===
- Risdeárd de Burca or Ruchard de Burgh, 6th Mac William Íochtar (died 1473), Irish chieftain and noble

=== T ===
- Tadhg de Búrca or Tadhg Bourke (born 1994), Irish hurler
- Tomás Óg de Burca or Tomás Óg de Burgh, 5th Mac William Iochtar (died 1460), Irish chieftain and noble
- Thomas mac Edmond Albanach de Burca or Thomas de Burgh, 2nd Mac William Iochtar (died 1402), Irish chieftain and noble

=== W ===
- Walter mac Thomas de Burca or Walter de Burgh, 3rd Mac William Iochtar (died 1440), Irish chieftain and noble

== See also ==
- Burke (disambiguation)
- House of Burgh, an Anglo-Norman and Hiberno-Norman dynasty founded in 1193
- Clanricarde (Mac William Uachtar/Upper Mac William) or Galway (Upper Connaught) Burkes
- DeBerg, surname
- de Burgh-Canning
- Earl of Clanricarde, earldom in the Peerage of Ireland created in 1543 and 1800
- Lord of Connaught, title claimed in the Peerage of Ireland
- Earl of Ulster, earldom created in the Peerage of Ireland in 1264
- Bourke (disambiguation)
- Burgo (disambiguation)
- De Burghs Bridge, road bridge in Sydney, Australia
