= Theobald Bourke =

Irish chieftain, noble and 8th Mac William Íochtar (d.1503)

Theobald Bourke 8th Mac William Iochtar
- Teabóid Búrca
- Arms of Bourke of Mayo
- Died: 1503

Theobald Bourke, 8th Mac William Iochtar (English: /bɜːrk/; BURK; died 1503) was an Irish chieftain and noble who succeeded his cousin (who retired in 1473) as lord of Lower (North) Connacht, Ireland.

== Background ==
Theobald was the son of Walter mac Thomas de Búrca (Walter Bourke), 3rd Mac William Iochtar (d.1440). In 1473, he succeeded his cousin, Ricard Ó Cuairsge Bourke, 7th Mac William Íochtar (d. 1479) as chieftain. Theobald was succeeded by his brother, Ricard Bourke, 9th Mac William Íochtar (d.1509).

== Annals of the Four Masters ==
From the Annals of the Four Masters:

- M1480.14. A spirited engagement took place between the sons of Edmond Burke and the sons of Richard Burke, in which the sons of Edmond were routed; and the son of Mac Dowell Mac Dugald of Scotland, i.e. Colla, was slain by one cast of a dart, and many others were slain along with him.
- M1486.15. An army was mustered by O'Donnell, and marched into Tirawley. The Lower Mac William went to oppose him; and a battle was fought between them, in which upwards of one hundred of Mac William's people were slain, and John Mac Jordan, Ulick, the son of Richard, son of Thomas Burke, with many others, were taken prisoners.
- M1487.26. Edmond, the son of Richard Burke, was treacherously taken prisoner by the Barretts, but was afterwards triumphantly rescued by his kinsmen.
- M1488.28. A peace was concluded between O'Donnell and Mac William Burke, O'Conor and Mac Dermot being as sureties and guarantees between them.

== Genealogy ==
Mac William Íochtar Genealogy
- Sir Edmond Albanach de Burgh (d. 1375), 1st Mac William Íochtar (Lower Mac William), (Mayo)
  - William de Burgh (d.1368)
  - Thomas mac Edmond Albanach de Burca, 1375–1402, 2nd Mac William Íochtar
    - Walter mac Thomas de Burca (d.1440), 3rd Mac William Íochtar
      - Theobald Bourke (d.1503), 8th Mac William Íochtar
        - Meiler Bourke (d.1520), 11th Mac William Íochtar
      - Ricard Bourke (d.1509), 9th Mac William Íochtar
        - Seaán an Tearmainn Bourke (alive 1527), 13th Mac William Íochtar
          - Ricard mac Seaán an Tearmainn Bourke (d.1571), 16th Mac William Íochtar
    - Edmund na Féasóige de Burca, (d.1458), 4th Mac William Íochtar
      - Ricard Ó Cuairsge Bourke (d.1473), 7th Mac William Íochtar
        - Edmond de Burca (d.1527), 10th Mac William Íochtar
        - Walter de Burca
        - Seaán de Burca
          - Oliver de Burca
            - Seaán mac Oliver Bourke (d.1580), 17th Mac William Íochtar
            - Richard Bourke (d.1586), 19th Mac William Íochtar
              - Walter Ciotach de Burca of Belleek (d.1590)
                - Tibbot (Theobald) MacWalter Kittagh Bourke, 21st Mac William Íochtar, 1st Marquess of Mayo
                  - Walter (Balthasar) Bourke, 2nd Marquess of Mayo
      - Thomas Ruadh de Burca
      - Uilleag de Burca
        - Edmond de Burca (d.1527), 12th Mac William Íochtar
          - David de Burca (alive 1537), 15th Mac William Íochtar
            - Richard the Iron Bourke (d.1583), 18th Mac William Íochtar
              - Tibbot (Theobald) ne Long Bourke (1567-1629), 23rd Mac William Íochtar, 1st Viscount Mayo (1627)
                - Viscounts Mayo
            - William "the Blind Abbot" Bourke (d.1593), 20th Mac William Íochtar
        - Theobald mac Uilleag Bourke (d.1537), 14th Mac William Íochtar
        - Risdeárd de Burca
          - Ricard Deamhan an Chorráin de Burca
            - Risdeárd Mac Deamhan an Chorráin (Richard) "the Devils Hook" Bourke (d.1601), 22nd Mac William Íochtar
    - Seaán de Burca (d.1456)
    - Tomás Óg de Burca, (d.1460), 5th Mac William Íochtar
    - Risdeárd de Burca (d.1473), 6th Mac William Íochtar

== See also ==
- House of Burgh, an Anglo-Norman and Hiberno-Norman dynasty founded in 1193

| Preceded by Ricard Ó Cuairsge Bourke | Mac William Iochtar; 1473-1503 | Succeeded by Ricard Bourke |
