= Ricard Bourke =

Irish chieftain, noble and 9th Mac William Íochtar (d.1509)

Richard Bourke 9th Mac William Iochtar
- Ricard Búrca
- Arms of Bourke of Mayo
- Died: 1509

Ricard Bourke, 9th Mac William Íochtar (English: /bɜːrk/; BURK; died in 1509) was an Irish chieftain and noble who was lord of Lower (North) Connacht, Ireland.

== Background ==
Ricard was the son of Walter mac Thomas de Búrca (Walter Bourke), 3rd Mac William Íochtar (d.1440). He succeeded his brother, Theobald Bourke, 8th Mac William Íochtar (d.1503) as chieftain in 1503. Ricard was succeeded by Edmond de Búrca, 10th Mac William Íochtar (d.1514), the son of Ricard's cousin, Ricard Ó Cuairsge Bourke, 7th Mac William Íochtar (d.1479).

== Annals of the Four Masters ==
From the Annals of the Four Masters:

== Genealogy ==
Mac William Íochtar Genealogy
- Sir Edmond Albanach de Burgh (d. 1375), 1st Mac William Íochtar (Lower Mac William), (Mayo)
  - William de Burgh (d.1368)
  - Thomas mac Edmond Albanach de Burca, 1375–1402, 2nd Mac William Íochtar
    - Walter mac Thomas de Burca (d.1440), 3rd Mac William Íochtar
      - Theobald Bourke (d.1503), 8th Mac William Íochtar
        - Meiler Bourke (d.1520), 11th Mac William Íochtar
      - Ricard Bourke (d.1509), 9th Mac William Íochtar
        - Seaán an Tearmainn Bourke (alive 1527), 13th Mac William Íochtar
          - Ricard mac Seaán an Tearmainn Bourke (d.1571), 16th Mac William Íochtar
    - Edmund na Féasóige de Burca, (d.1458), 4th Mac William Íochtar
      - Ricard Ó Cuairsge Bourke (d.1473), 7th Mac William Íochtar
        - Edmond de Burca, 10th Mac William Íochtar
        - Walter de Burca
        - Seaán de Burca
          - Oliver de Burca
            - Seaán mac Oliver Bourke (d.1580), 17th Mac William Íochtar
            - Richard Bourke (d.1586), 19th Mac William Íochtar
              - Walter Ciotach de Burca of Belleek (d.1590)
                - Tibbot (Theobald) MacWalter Kittagh Bourke, 21st Mac William Íochtar, 1st Marquess of Mayo
                  - Walter (Balthasar) Bourke, 2nd Marquess of Mayo
      - Thomas Ruadh de Burca
      - Uilleag de Burca
        - Edmond de Burca (d.1527), 12th Mac William Íochtar
          - David de Burca (alive 1537), 15th Mac William Íochtar
            - Richard the Iron Bourke (d.1583), 18th Mac William Íochtar
              - Tibbot (Theobald) ne Long Bourke (1567-1629), 23rd Mac William Íochtar, 1st Viscount Mayo (1627)
                - Viscounts Mayo
            - William "the Blind Abbot" Bourke (d.1593), 20th Mac William Íochtar
        - Theobald mac Uilleag Bourke (d.1537), 14th Mac William Íochtar
        - Risdeárd de Burca
          - Ricard Deamhan an Chorráin de Burca
            - Risdeárd Mac Deamhan an Chorráin (Richard) "the Devils Hook" Bourke (d.1601), 22nd Mac William Íochtar
    - Seaán de Burca (d.1456)
    - Tomás Óg de Burca, (d.1460), 5th Mac William Íochtar
    - Risdeárd de Burca (d.1473), 6th Mac William Íochtar

== See also ==
- House of Burgh, an Anglo-Norman and Hiberno-Norman dynasty founded in 1193

| Preceded by Theobald Bourke | Mac William Iochtar; 1503–1509 | Succeeded by Edmond de Burca |
