= Edmond Albanach de Burgh =

Irish chieftain, noble and 1st Mac William Íochtar (1315–1375)

Edmond Albanach de Burgh 1st Mac William Íochtar
- Native name: Edmond Albanach de Búrca
- Born: 1315; Galway, Ireland
- Died: 1375 (aged 59–60)
- Noble family: House of Burgh
- Spouses: (1) Sadhbh Ní Mháille (2) Finola Ní Cellaigh#
- Issue: (1) Thomas mac Edmond Albanach Bourke (2) William Saxonagh Bourke (2) Theobald (2) Richard
- Father: William Liath de Burgh
- Mother: Finola Ní Bhriain

Edmond Albanach de Burgh, 1st Mac William Íochtar (English: /dəˈbɜːr/ də-BUR; born before 1315; died 1375) was an Irish chieftain and noble who established himself as the most powerful lord in Connacht west of the Shannon.

== Early life ==
Edmond Albanach was the son of Sir William Liath de Burgh (d.1324). He acquired his nickname from the time he spent in Scotland from the spring of 1316 as a hostage for his father, after the latter's release by Robert the Bruce.

== Mac William Íochtar ==
The murder of his brother, Walter Liath de Burgh, in 1332, directly led to the destruction of the de Burgh Earldom of Ulster and Lordship of Connacht. Warfare between the de Burgh factions climaxed with the murder of a cousin, Edmond de Burgh of Clanwilliam by Albanach at Lough Mask in 1338. Albanch was driven from Connacht for this, but gathered a fleet which harassed the coast of Connacht till he was delivered a royal pardon in March 1340. He was able to maintain himself as the most powerful lord west of the Shannon, over the O'Conor's and Clanricardes'.

== Annals of the Four Masters ==
From the Annals of the Four Masters:

M1335.4. The entire of the West of Connaught was desolated by Edmond Burke. Great evils were also wrought by him, both by burning and slaying, upon the son of the Earl and the race of Richard Burke. They afterwards made peace with one another.

== Family and descendants ==
De Burgh had two wives, Sadhbh Ní Mháille, daughter of Diarmuid mac Owen Ó Máille, with whom he had one son:

- Thomas mac Edmond Albanach de Búrca, 2nd Mac William Íochtar, (d. 1402), married Una Ní Conchobair in 1397.

and Finola Ní Cellaigh with whom he may have fathered:

- William Saxonagh Bourke, died 1368
- Theobald, killed in 1374
- Richard, killed in 1377

Thomas de Burgh (d.1402) had five sons, each of whom succeeded each other in the Lordship of the Lower MacWilliam. The Fourth son was ancestor to the Earls of Mayo. His eldest son:-

- Walter de Burgh of Shruel (c1360- 1440) Lord of the Lower MacWilliam m. Sabia, a daughter of O'Brien, Lord of Thomond

his eldest son:-

- John of Shruel (1395–1445), acquired the property of Dromkeen, County Limerick in 1420. m. a sister of the O'Brien.

his eldest son:-

- William 'The Black' or 'Dhue'(1418–1469) of Dromkeen m. Honore a daughter of one of his Clanricarde cousins

his eldest son:-

- Meyler (d.1495) Lord of Lebanon, succeeded by his son:- Richard (1465–1540) of Dromkeen, succeeded by his son:- Richard Og (1520–1595), succeeded by his son:- Ulick (b. 1575), succeeded by his son:- Richard (1600–1659), succeeded by his son:-
- Rt Rev Ulysees Burgh (1648–1693), Lord Bishop of Ardagh (Church of Ireland) m. Mary a daughter of Colonel William Kingsmill of Ballyowen County Tipperary.

who had three sons:-

- Richard (b. 1666) of Dromkeen and Drumrusk, MP, whose estates were inherited by a cousin Walter Hussey who assumed the name Hussey de Burgh after the male line became extinct in 1778.
- Colonel Thomas de Burgh of Oldtown, MP. (1670–1730) Minister, Surveyor General of Ireland and architect of Trinity College Dublin Library. From him descend the de Burghs of Oldtown.
- William de Burgh of Bert, MP (d. 1744) Comptroller and Accountant General for Ireland, grandfather of William de Burgh MP (1696–1754) Anti Slavery Campaigner.

== Arms ==
Coat of arms of Edmond Albanach de Burgh
Escutcheon Party per fess Or and Ermine, a cross gules the first quarter charged with a lion rampant sable and the second with a dexter hand couped at the wrist and erect gules

== Genealogy ==
Mac William Íochtar Genealogy
- Sir Edmond Albanach de Burgh (d. 1375), 1st Mac William Íochtar (Lower Mac William), (Mayo)
  - William de Burgh (d.1368)
  - Thomas mac Edmond Albanach de Burca, 1375–1402, 2nd Mac William Íochtar
    - Walter mac Thomas de Burca (d.1440), 3rd Mac William Íochtar
      - Theobald Bourke (d.1503), 8th Mac William Íochtar
        - Meiler Bourke (d.1520), 11th Mac William Íochtar
      - Ricard Bourke (d.1509), 9th Mac William Íochtar
        - Seaán an Tearmainn Bourke (alive 1527), 13th Mac William Íochtar
          - Ricard mac Seaán an Tearmainn Bourke (d.1571), 16th Mac William Íochtar
    - Edmund na Féasóige de Burca, (d.1458), 4th Mac William Íochtar
      - Ricard Ó Cuairsge Bourke (d.1473), 7th Mac William Íochtar
        - Edmond de Burca (d.1527), 10th Mac William Íochtar
        - Walter de Burca
        - Seaán de Burca
          - Oliver de Burca
            - Seaán mac Oliver Bourke (d.1580), 17th Mac William Íochtar
            - Richard Bourke (d.1586), 19th Mac William Íochtar
              - Walter Ciotach de Burca of Belleek (d.1590)
                - Tibbot (Theobald) MacWalter Kittagh Bourke, 21st Mac William Íochtar, 1st Marquess of Mayo
                  - Walter (Balthasar) Bourke, 2nd Marquess of Mayo
      - Thomas Ruadh de Burca
      - Uilleag de Burca
        - Edmond de Burca (d.1527), 12th Mac William Íochtar
          - David de Burca (alive 1537), 15th Mac William Íochtar
            - Richard the Iron Bourke (d.1583), 18th Mac William Íochtar
              - Tibbot (Theobald) ne Long Bourke (1567-1629), 23rd Mac William Íochtar, 1st Viscount Mayo (1627)
                - Viscounts Mayo
            - William "the Blind Abbot" Bourke (d.1593), 20th Mac William Íochtar
        - Theobald mac Uilleag Bourke (d.1537), 14th Mac William Íochtar
        - Risdeárd de Burca
          - Ricard Deamhan an Chorráin de Burca
            - Risdeárd Mac Deamhan an Chorráin (Richard) "the Devils Hook" Bourke (d.1601), 22nd Mac William Íochtar
    - Seaán de Burca (d.1456)
    - Tomás Óg de Burca, (d.1460), 5th Mac William Íochtar
    - Risdeárd de Burca (d.1473), 6th Mac William Íochtar

== See also ==
- House of Burgh, an Anglo-Norman and Hiberno-Norman dynasty founded in 1193

Preceded by New creation	Mac William Íochtar; 1332–1375	Succeeded by Thomas mac Edmond Albanach de Burca
