= Ricard Ó Cuairsge Bourke =

Irish chieftain, noble and 7th Mac William Íochtar (d.1473)

Richard Bourke 7th Mac William Iochtar
- Ricard Ó Cuairsge Búrca
- Arms of Bourke of Mayo
- Died: 1473

Ricard Ó Cuairsge Bourke, 7th Mac William Íochtar (English: /bɜːrk/; BURK; died 1479) was an Irish chieftain and noble.

== Background ==
A son of Edmund na Féasóige de Búrca, 4th Mac William Íochtar (d.1458), Ricard was tánaiste for his uncle, Risdeárd de Búrca, 6th Mac William Íochtar (d.1473), who had succeeded his brother Tomás Óg de Búrca, 5th Mac William Íochtar in 1460. The elder Risdeárd was by then over sixty years old, which meant that Ricard O'Cuairsge was the real power in the lordship.

Ricard O'Cuairsge succeeded his uncle in 1469 as chieftain, and much of his reign was spent curbing the ambitions of the O'Donnells who were expanding into north Connacht via Sligo, in which aim he was successful.

In 1473, Ricard had been succeeded by his cousin, Thobald mac Walter Bourke, 8th Mac William Íochtar (d.1503), the son of Walter mac Thomas de Búrca, 3rd Mac William Íochtar (d.1440). Ricard died from a fall from his horse in 1479.

== Annals of the Four Masters ==
From the Annals of the Four Masters:

- M1469.18. Richard, son of Thomas Burke, resigned his lordship; and Richard, son of Edmund Burke, was appointed in his place.
- M1469.19. A great army was mustered by O'Donnell (Hugh Roe), with the chiefs of Tirconnell, joined by the rising out of Lower Connaught, and marched, without halting, until he reached Mac William Burke i.e. Richard, the son of Edmond, who came with submission to O'Donnell. These chieftains afterwards held a consultation, and resolved on marching against Mac William of Clanrickard (Ulick, son of Ulick-an-Fhiona), to wreak their vengeance on him for the defeat of Cros-Moighe-Croinn, which Mac William of Clanrickard had some time before given to Mac William Burke; and being unanimous on this resolution, they proceeded into Clanrickard. Machaire-Riabhach was the first place burned and destroyed by them. They were for a night encamped at Baile-an-Chlair, the town of Mac William, which they afterwards burned; and they continued for some time destroying and laying waste the country on every side. Mac William (i.e. Ulick), however, drew and gathered to his assistance the sons of O'Brien, i.e. Gilla-Duv, the son of Teige, and Murtough Garv, the son of Teige, and a body of the Dalcassian chieftains along with them. Mac William, with his own troops and muster, came up with O'Donnell as he was leaving the country; and Mac William's cavalry and the O'Briens made the first charge on the rear of O'Donnell's army, at Baile-an-Duibh. This was vigorously responded to by O'Donnell's cavalry, and in particular by Egneghan, the son of Naghtan O'Donnell, who was in the rear of O'Donnell's army, so that the cavalry of Mac William and of the O'Briens were finally defeated; and Donnell, the son of O'Conor of Corcomroe, and many others not enumerated, were slain on the occasion. Mac William and the O'Briens, however, rallied their forces, and, placing themselves in array and order, they pursued with one accord the army of O'Donnell. This, however, was of no profit to them, for O'Donnell's army wheeled round on Mac William's and the O'Briens' cavalry at the river which is called Glanog, and there routed them again; and the defeated left many men, horses, and things of value, behind them, and fled in an inglorious retreat This was called The Defeat of Glanog.
- M1471.10. O'Donnell and the sons of Owen O'Conor committed vast depredations on the creaghts of Carbury, and on the Mac Donoughs on this side of Sligo. A great army was led by Mac William Burke into Lower i.e. North Connaught, to assist Rory, the son of Brian O'Conor; and they attacked the castle of Sligo. the sons of Owen O'Conor were at this time with O'Donnell. Donnell, son of Owen, went into the castle, but Mac William broke down the tower of the gate, after which they made peace.
- M1472.17. An army was led by Mac William Burke into Hy-Many, to assist Teige Caech O'Kelly; but after having subdued the Hy-Many from the Suck westwards, and obtained hostages from them, he at last suffered a great loss, for twenty-six of his people privately deserted from his army, among whom were the son of Mac Walter Burke, the sons of Maurice, the sons of Mac Jordan, the son of Mac Anveely, &c. The Hy-Many made prisoners of or slew all these, excepting only Mac Jordan, who made his escape through main strength of arm, though he was severely wounded. Mac William returned home in sorrow.

== Genealogy ==
Mac William Íochtar Genealogy
- Sir Edmond Albanach de Burgh (d. 1375), 1st Mac William Íochtar (Lower Mac William), (Mayo)
  - William de Burgh (d.1368)
  - Thomas mac Edmond Albanach de Burca, 1375–1402, 2nd Mac William Íochtar
    - Walter mac Thomas de Burca (d.1440), 3rd Mac William Íochtar
      - Theobald Bourke (d.1503), 8th Mac William Íochtar
        - Meiler Bourke (d.1520), 11th Mac William Íochtar
      - Ricard Bourke (d.1509), 9th Mac William Íochtar
        - Seaán an Tearmainn Bourke (alive 1527), 13th Mac William Íochtar
          - Ricard mac Seaán an Tearmainn Bourke (d.1571), 16th Mac William Íochtar
    - Edmund na Féasóige de Burca, (d.1458), 4th Mac William Íochtar
      - Ricard Ó Cuairsge Bourke (d.1473), 7th Mac William Íochtar
        - Edmond de Burca (d.1527), 10th Mac William Íochtar
        - Walter de Burca
        - Seaán de Burca
          - Oliver de Burca
            - Seaán mac Oliver Bourke (d.1580), 17th Mac William Íochtar
            - Richard Bourke (d.1586), 19th Mac William Íochtar
              - Walter Ciotach de Burca of Belleek (d.1590)
                - Tibbot (Theobald) MacWalter Kittagh Bourke, 21st Mac William Íochtar, 1st Marquess of Mayo
                  - Walter (Balthasar) Bourke, 2nd Marquess of Mayo
      - Thomas Ruadh de Burca
      - Uilleag de Burca
        - Edmond de Burca (d.1527), 12th Mac William Íochtar
          - David de Burca (alive 1537), 15th Mac William Íochtar
            - Richard the Iron Bourke (d.1583), 18th Mac William Íochtar
              - Tibbot (Theobald) ne Long Bourke (1567-1629), 23rd Mac William Íochtar, 1st Viscount Mayo (1627)
                - Viscounts Mayo
            - William "the Blind Abbot" Bourke (d.1593), 20th Mac William Íochtar
        - Theobald mac Uilleag Bourke (d.1537), 14th Mac William Íochtar
        - Risdeárd de Burca
          - Ricard Deamhan an Chorráin de Burca
            - Risdeárd Mac Deamhan an Chorráin (Richard) "the Devils Hook" Bourke (d.1601), 22nd Mac William Íochtar
    - Seaán de Burca (d.1456)
    - Tomás Óg de Burca, (d.1460), 5th Mac William Íochtar
    - Risdeárd de Burca (d.1473), 6th Mac William Íochtar

== See also ==
- House of Burgh, an Anglo-Norman and Hiberno-Norman dynasty founded in 1193

Preceded by Risdeárd de Burca	Mac William Íochtar; 1469–1473	Succeeded by Theobald Bourke
