= Walter mac Thomas de Búrca =

Irish chieftain, noble and 3rd Mac William Íochtar (d.1440)

Walter Bourke 3rd Mac William Iochtar
- Walter mac Tomas de Búrca
- Arms of Bourke of Mayo
- Died: 1440

Walter mac Thomas de Búrca (Walter Bourke), 3rd Mac William Íochtar (died 1440) was an Irish chieftain and noble who was lord of Lower (North) Connacht, Ireland.

== Life ==
The son of Thomas mac Edmond Albanach de Búrca, 2nd Mac William Íochtar (d.1402), de Búrca was succeeded by his younger brothers, Edmund na Féasóige de Búrca (4th), Tomás Óg de Búrca (5th), and Risdeárd de Búrca (6th Mac William Íochtar), and later by his sons, Theobald Bourke (8th) and Ricard Bourke (9th Mac William Íochtar).

== Annals of the Four Masters ==
From the Annals of the Four Masters:

- 1402. Thomas, the son of Sir Edmond Albanagh Burke, i.e. Mac William, Lord of the English of Connaught, died, after the victory of penance. After the death of this Thomas Burke, two Mac Williams were made, namely, Ulick, the son of Richard Oge, who was elected the Mac William; and Walter, the son of Thomas, who was made another Mac William, but yielded submission to Mac William of Clanrickard for his seniority.
- M1410.8. Sabia, the daughter of Conor O'Brien, and wife of Walter Burke, died.
- M1412.10. A great army was led by Brian, son of Donnell, son of Murtough O'Conor of Sligo, about Lammas, first into Gaileanga, and thence into Clann-Cuain, Ceara, and Conmaicne Cuile Toladh, into which latter territory he brought the Clann-Maurice na-m-Brigh and their creaghts. The Clann-William Burke, the O'Flahertys, the O'Malleys, the Barretts, the inhabitants of the barony of Gaileanga, and the Costelloes, assembled to oppose them; but all these numerous as they were did not venture to give him either skirmish or battle, although Brian, in spite of them, burned their territories, destroyed their cornfields, and burned their fortresses, viz. Caislen-an-Bharraigh of Leth-inis, and Baile-Loch-Measca. He then left the Clann-Maurice, with their creaghts, in their own territory; and he obtained peace from the English and Irish on this expedition, and returned home in safety.
- M1422.12. The sons of Cormac Mac Donough, and the sons of Mulrony Mac Donough, ... had been banished from their country by their paternal uncle, Mac Donough, by Conor Mac Donough and his sons, and by Cormac Oge. For Mac Donough had erected a castle in the territory of the sons of Mulrony Mac Donough, that is, at Caiseal Locha-Deargain, and had entirely destroyed their crops and fields, and afterwards banished them to Mac William Burke;
- M1440.1. Mac William Burke, i.e. Walter, the son of Thomas, son of Sir Edmond Albanagh, Lord of the English of Connaught, and of many of the Irish, died of the plague a week before the Festival of the Holy Cross, in Autumn; and Edmond Burke, his brother, was styled Mac William in his place.

== Genealogy ==
Mac William Íochtar Genealogy
- Sir Edmond Albanach de Burgh (d. 1375), 1st Mac William Íochtar (Lower Mac William), (Mayo)
  - William de Burgh (d.1368)
  - Thomas mac Edmond Albanach de Burca, 1375–1402, 2nd Mac William Íochtar
    - Walter mac Thomas de Burca (d.1440), 3rd Mac William Íochtar
      - Theobald Bourke (d.1503), 8th Mac William Íochtar
        - Meiler Bourke (d.1520), 11th Mac William Íochtar
      - Ricard Bourke (d.1509), 9th Mac William Íochtar
        - Seaán an Tearmainn Bourke (alive 1527), 13th Mac William Íochtar
          - Ricard mac Seaán an Tearmainn Bourke (d.1571), 16th Mac William Íochtar
    - Edmund na Féasóige de Burca, (d.1458), 4th Mac William Íochtar
      - Ricard Ó Cuairsge Bourke (d.1473), 7th Mac William Íochtar
        - Edmond de Burca (d.1527), 10th Mac William Íochtar
        - Walter de Burca
        - Seaán de Burca
          - Oliver de Burca
            - Seaán mac Oliver Bourke (d.1580), 17th Mac William Íochtar
            - Richard Bourke (d.1586), 19th Mac William Íochtar
              - Walter Ciotach de Burca of Belleek (d.1590)
                - Tibbot (Theobald) MacWalter Kittagh Bourke, 21st Mac William Íochtar, 1st Marquess of Mayo
                  - Walter (Balthasar) Bourke, 2nd Marquess of Mayo
      - Thomas Ruadh de Burca
      - Uilleag de Burca
        - Edmond de Burca (d.1527), 12th Mac William Íochtar
          - David de Burca (alive 1537), 15th Mac William Íochtar
            - Richard the Iron Bourke (d.1583), 18th Mac William Íochtar
              - Tibbot (Theobald) ne Long Bourke (1567–1629), 23rd Mac William Íochtar, 1st Viscount Mayo (1627)
                - Viscounts Mayo
            - William "the Blind Abbot" Bourke (d.1593), 20th Mac William Íochtar
        - Theobald mac Uilleag Bourke (d.1537), 14th Mac William Íochtar
        - Risdeárd de Burca
          - Ricard Deamhan an Chorráin de Burca
            - Risdeárd Mac Deamhan an Chorráin (Richard) "the Devils Hook" Bourke (d.1601), 22nd Mac William Íochtar
    - Seaán de Burca (d.1456)
    - Tomás Óg de Burca, (d.1460), 5th Mac William Íochtar
    - Risdeárd de Burca (d.1473), 6th Mac William Íochtar

== See also ==
- House of Burgh, an Anglo-Norman and Hiberno-Norman dynasty founded in 1193

Preceded by Thomas mac Edmond Albanach de Burca	Mac William Iochtar; 1402–1440	Succeeded by Edmund na Féasóige de Burca
