= David de Búrca =

Irish chieftain, noble and 15th Mac William Íochtar (living 1537)

David Bourke 15th Mac William Iochtar
- David de Búrca
- Arms of Bourke of Mayo

David de Búrca, 15th Mac William Íochtar (alive 1537) was an Irish chieftain and noble.

== Background ==
David was the son of Edmond de Búrca, 12th Mac William Íochtar (d.1527). He succeeded his uncle, Theobald mac Uilleag Bourke, 14th Mac William Íochtar (d.1537). His successor was Ricard mac Seaán an Tearmainn Bourke, 16th Mac William Íochtar (d.1571).

David's sons were Richard "the Iron" Bourke, 18th Mac William Íochtar (d.1583), and William "the Blind Abbot" Bourke, 20th Mac William Íochtar (d.1593).

== Genealogy ==
Mac William Íochtar Genealogy
- Sir Edmond Albanach de Burgh (d. 1375), 1st Mac William Íochtar (Lower Mac William), (Mayo)
  - William de Burgh (d.1368)
  - Thomas mac Edmond Albanach de Burca, 1375–1402, 2nd Mac William Íochtar
    - Walter mac Thomas de Burca (d.1440), 3rd Mac William Íochtar
      - Theobald Bourke (d.1503), 8th Mac William Íochtar
        - Meiler Bourke (d.1520), 11th Mac William Íochtar
      - Ricard Bourke (d.1509), 9th Mac William Íochtar
        - Seaán an Tearmainn Bourke (alive 1527), 13th Mac William Íochtar
          - Ricard mac Seaán an Tearmainn Bourke (d.1571), 16th Mac William Íochtar
    - Edmund na Féasóige de Burca, (d.1458), 4th Mac William Íochtar
      - Ricard Ó Cuairsge Bourke (d.1473), 7th Mac William Íochtar
        - Edmond de Burca (d.1527), 10th Mac William Íochtar
        - Walter de Burca
        - Seaán de Burca
          - Oliver de Burca
            - Seaán mac Oliver Bourke (d.1580), 17th Mac William Íochtar
            - Richard Bourke (d.1586), 19th Mac William Íochtar
              - Walter Ciotach de Burca of Belleek (d.1590)
                - Tibbot (Theobald) MacWalter Kittagh Bourke, 21st Mac William Íochtar, 1st Marquess of Mayo
                  - Walter (Balthasar) Bourke, 2nd Marquess of Mayo
      - Thomas Ruadh de Burca
      - Uilleag de Burca
        - Edmond de Burca (d.1527), 12th Mac William Íochtar
          - David de Burca (alive 1537), 15th Mac William Íochtar
            - Richard the Iron Bourke (d.1583), 18th Mac William Íochtar
              - Tibbot (Theobald) ne Long Bourke (1567–1629), 23rd Mac William Íochtar, 1st Viscount Mayo (1627)
                - Viscounts Mayo
            - William "the Blind Abbot" Bourke (d.1593), 20th Mac William Íochtar
        - Theobald mac Uilleag Bourke (d.1537), 14th Mac William Íochtar
        - Risdeárd de Burca
          - Ricard Deamhan an Chorráin de Burca
            - Risdeárd Mac Deamhan an Chorráin (Richard) "the Devils Hook" Bourke (d.1601), 22nd Mac William Íochtar
    - Seaán de Burca (d.1456)
    - Tomás Óg de Burca, (d.1460), 5th Mac William Íochtar
    - Risdeárd de Burca (d.1473), 6th Mac William Íochtar

== Annals of the Four Masters ==
From the Annals of the Four Masters:

== See also ==
- House of Burgh, an Anglo-Norman and Hiberno-Norman dynasty founded in 1193

Preceded by Theobald mac Uilleag Bourke	Mac William Iochtar; 1537–?	Succeeded by Ricard mac Seaán an Tearmainn Bourke
