= Thomas mac Edmond Albanach de Búrca =

Irish chieftain, noble and 2nd Mac William Íochtar (d.1402)

Thomas Bourke 2nd Mac William Iochtar
- Tomas mac Edmond Albanach de Búrca
- Arms of Bourke of Mayo
- Died: 1402

Thomas mac Edmond Albanach de Búrca, 2nd Mac William Íochtar (Lower Mac William or Mac William Bourke) (died 1402) was an Irish chieftain and noble who was lord of Lower (North) Connacht, Ireland.

== Family background ==
A son of Sir Edmond Albanach de Burgh, 1st Mac William Íochtar (d.1375) and Sadhbh Ní Mháille (daughter of Diarmuid mac Owen Ó Máille), de Búrca succeeded his father as chieftain in 1375. Thomas died in 1402, and was succeeded by his son Walter mac Thomas de Búrca, 3rd Mac William Íochtar (d.1440). In total, Thomas had the following issue:

- 1 - Meyler, died 1384.
- 2 - David, died 1384.
- 3 - John, died 1384.
- 4 - Walter, died 1440.
- 5 - Edmond, died 1458.
- 6 - Thomas, died 1460.
- 7 - Richard, died 1473
- 8 - Meyler, died 1462.

From his son, Walter, descended almost all subsequent Mac William Iochtars and their successors.

== Annals of the Four Masters ==
From the Annals of the Four Masters:

- M1375.11. Sir Edmond Albanagh Mac William Burke died, after the victory of Penance: Thomas, his son, assumed the lordship after him.
- M1377.5. Rory O'Conor defeated Mac William Burke, and Melaghlin O'Kelly, Lord of Hy-Many, at Roscommon, where Richard Burke, the brother of Mac William, Donnell, the son of Cathal Oge O'Conor, Teige Oge, the son of Teige O'Kelly, O'Mainnin, Chief of Sodan, Mac Dowell Galloglagh, and many other persons not enumerated, were slain.
- M1380.3. Mac William Burke defeated Mac William Uachtrach (Richard Oge) at the town of Atha-leathann (Strade), where Mac Jordan de Exeter, Lord of Athleathan, and John de Exeter, were slain.
- M1384.13. Meyler, son of Sir William Burke, was killed by a fall. John and David, two other sons of Mac William Burke, died of the plague.
- M1385.8. Tireragh was burned by Mac William Burke; he afterwards went to Sligo, which was burned by him in like manner, together with South Carbury. But here battle was given to him, and Maidiuc Mael, one of the chiefs of his people, was slain; and hostages were afterwards forced from him.
- M1386.7. O'Conor Roe, with all the Connacians he could find to join him, went to assist Mac William Burke against Donnell, the son of Murtough O'Conor Sligo, and the Clann-Donough. They carried off great preys from Tir-Fiachrach Muaidhe. After this they proceeded to Clanrickard on a predatory excursion. O'Brien, with a great army, and Mac William of Clanrickard, came up with them; but O'Conor Roe turned round on them, and defeated them; and Conor, the son of Teige, son of Conor O'Brien, was slain in the conflict.
- M1386.11. A peace was made by the Connacians with one another after the war, and Mac William Burke went into the house of Mac William of Clanrickard, and ceded to him the lordship. Mac Feorais Bermingham went into his house in like manner.
- M1394.12. Mac William Burke, i e. Thomas, went into the King's house, and received great honour, and lordship, and chieftainship over the English of Connaught.
- M1395.16. Mac Jordan de Exeter was taken prisoner by the Clann-Mac-Jordan, and delivered up into the hands of Mac William Burke. An army was led by Donnell, the son of Murtough O'Conor, and the Irish of Lower Connaught, into Mac William's territory, in consequence of the capture of Mac Jordan; and Mac Jordan was liberated, and peace was ratified between the English and Irish of the province on this occasion.
- M1398.4. An army was led by Thomas Burke, Lord of the English of Connaught, and by O'Conor Roe and the sons of Cathal Oge, into Tirerrill, which they entirely plundered.
- M1398.20. Mac William Burke burned Sligo.
- M1401 (sic). Thomas, the son of Sir Edmond Albanagh Burke, i.e. Mac William, Lord of the English of Connaught, died, after the victory of penance. After the death of this Thomas Burke, two Mac Williams were made, namely, Ulick, the son of Richard Oge, who was elected the Mac William; and Walter, the son of Thomas, who was made another Mac William, but yielded submission to Mac William of Clanrickard for his seniority.

== Genealogy ==
Mac William Íochtar Genealogy
- Sir Edmond Albanach de Burgh (d. 1375), 1st Mac William Íochtar (Lower Mac William), (Mayo)
  - William de Burgh (d.1368)
  - Thomas mac Edmond Albanach de Búrca, 1375–1402, 2nd Mac William Íochtar
    - Walter mac Thomas de Búrca (d.1440), 3rd Mac William Íochtar
      - Theobald Bourke (d.1503), 8th Mac William Íochtar
        - Meiler Bourke (d.1520), 11th Mac William Íochtar
      - Ricard Bourke (d.1509), 9th Mac William Íochtar
        - Seaán an Tearmainn Bourke (alive 1527), 13th Mac William Íochtar
          - Ricard mac Seaán an Tearmainn Bourke (d.1571), 16th Mac William Íochtar
    - Edmund na Féasóige de Búrca, (d.1458), 4th Mac William Íochtar
      - Ricard Ó Cuairsge Bourke (d.1473), 7th Mac William Íochtar
        - Edmond de Búrca (d.1527), 10th Mac William Íochtar
        - Walter de Búrca
        - Seaán de Búrca
          - Oliver de Búrca
            - Seaán mac Oliver Bourke (d.1580), 17th Mac William Íochtar
            - Richard Bourke (d.1586), 19th Mac William Íochtar
              - Walter Ciotach de Búrca of Belleek (d.1590)
                - Tibbot (Theobald) MacWalter Kittagh Bourke, 21st Mac William Íochtar, 1st Marquess of Mayo
                  - Walter (Balthasar) Bourke, 2nd Marquess of Mayo
      - Thomas Ruadh de Búrca
      - Uilleag de Búrca
        - Edmond de Búrca (d.1527), 12th Mac William Íochtar
          - David de Búrca (alive 1537), 15th Mac William Íochtar
            - Richard the Iron Bourke (d.1583), 18th Mac William Íochtar
              - Tibbot (Theobald) ne Long Bourke (1567-1629), 23rd Mac William Íochtar, 1st Viscount Mayo (1627)
                - Viscounts Mayo
            - William "the Blind Abbot" Bourke (d.1593), 20th Mac William Íochtar
        - Theobald mac Uilleag Bourke (d.1537), 14th Mac William Íochtar
        - Risdeárd de Búrca
          - Ricard Deamhan an Chorráin de Búrca
            - Risdeárd Mac Deamhan an Chorráin (Richard) "the Devils Hook" Bourke (d.1601), 22nd Mac William Íochtar
    - Seaán de Búrca (d.1456)
    - Tomás Óg de Búrca, (d.1460), 5th Mac William Íochtar
    - Risdeárd de Búrca (d.1473), 6th Mac William Íochtar

== See also ==
- House of Burgh, an Anglo-Norman and Hiberno-Norman dynasty founded in 1193

Preceded by Edmond Albanach de Burgh	Mac William Íochtar; 1375–1402	Succeeded by Walter mac Thomas Bourke
