= Seaán mac Oliver Bourke =

Irish chieftain, noble, 17th Mac William Íochtar and Baron Ardenerie (d.1580)

John Bourke 17th Lord of Mac William Íochtar 1st Baron Ardenerie
- Seaán mac Oliver Búrca
- Arms of Bourke of Mayo
- Died: 24 November 1580
- Children: William Bourke

Seaán mac Oliver (John) Bourke, 17th Mac William Íochtar (Lower Mac William or Mac William Oughter) (English: /bɜːrk/ BURK; died 1580) was an Irish noble who was created Baron Ardenerie (1580).

== Career ==
Bourke was the son of Oliver Bourke of Tirawley, grandson of Seaán Bourke, and a great-grandson of Ricard Ó Cuairsge Bourke, 7th Mac William Íochtar (d.1479). He developed his power base using gallowglass mercenaries, and by 1570 was regarded as the next Mac William Íochtar (Lower Mac Williams). He was created Baron Ardenerie in May 1580.

Despite the contemporaneous culture of those of his class, he had little love for war and seemed concerned for the well-being of his people. Upon being reproached by an old woman for burdening his people with the maintenance of his Scottish troops, he lamented that without them, they would be at the mercy of their enemies who would be just as burdensome.

== Book of the Burkes ==
Bourke is rightly famous as the patron of The Book of the Burkes. He spoke Irish and Latin, but not English.

He died on 24 November 1580, and was succeeded, as Baron Ardenerie, by his son William. As Mac William Íochtar, he was succeeded by his cousin, Richard "the Iron" Bourke, 18th Mac William Íochtar (d.1583), the son of David de Búrca, 15th Mac William Íochtar.

== Genealogy ==
Mac William Íochtar Genealogy
- Sir Edmond Albanach de Burgh (d. 1375), 1st Mac William Íochtar (Lower Mac William), (Mayo)
  - William de Burgh (d.1368)
  - Thomas mac Edmond Albanach de Burca, 1375–1402, 2nd Mac William Íochtar
    - Walter mac Thomas de Burca (d.1440), 3rd Mac William Íochtar
      - Theobald Bourke (d.1503), 8th Mac William Íochtar
        - Meiler Bourke (d.1520), 11th Mac William Íochtar
      - Ricard Bourke (d.1509), 9th Mac William Íochtar
        - Seaán an Tearmainn Bourke (alive 1527), 13th Mac William Íochtar
          - Ricard mac Seaán an Tearmainn Bourke (d.1571), 16th Mac William Íochtar
    - Edmund na Féasóige de Burca, (d.1458), 4th Mac William Íochtar
      - Ricard Ó Cuairsge Bourke (d.1473), 7th Mac William Íochtar
        - Edmond de Burca (d.1527), 10th Mac William Íochtar
        - Walter de Burca
        - Seaán de Burca
          - Oliver de Burca
            - Seaán mac Oliver Bourke (d.1580), 17th Mac William Íochtar
            - Richard Bourke (d.1586), 19th Mac William Íochtar
              - Walter Ciotach de Burca of Belleek (d.1590)
                - Tibbot (Theobald) MacWalter Kittagh Bourke, 21st Mac William Íochtar, 1st Marquess of Mayo
                  - Walter (Balthasar) Bourke, 2nd Marquess of Mayo
      - Thomas Ruadh de Burca
      - Uilleag de Burca
        - Edmond de Burca (d.1527), 12th Mac William Íochtar
          - David de Burca (alive 1537), 15th Mac William Íochtar
            - Richard the Iron Bourke (d.1583), 18th Mac William Íochtar
              - Tibbot (Theobald) ne Long Bourke (1567-1629), 23rd Mac William Íochtar, 1st Viscount Mayo (1627)
                - Viscounts Mayo
            - William "the Blind Abbot" Bourke (d.1593), 20th Mac William Íochtar
        - Theobald mac Uilleag Bourke (d.1537), 14th Mac William Íochtar
        - Risdeárd de Burca
          - Ricard Deamhan an Chorráin de Burca
            - Risdeárd Mac Deamhan an Chorráin (Richard) "the Devils Hook" Bourke (d.1601), 22nd Mac William Íochtar
    - Seaán de Burca (d.1456)
    - Tomás Óg de Burca, (d.1460), 5th Mac William Íochtar
    - Risdeárd de Burca (d.1473), 6th Mac William Íochtar

== See also ==
- House of Burgh, an Anglo-Norman and Hiberno-Norman dynasty founded in 1193

Preceded by Ricard mac Seaán an Tearmainn Bourke	Mac William Iochtar; 1571–1580	Succeeded by Richard "the Iron" Bourke
Peerage of Ireland
New creation	Baron Ardenerie; 1580	Succeeded by William Bourke
