= Tomás Óg de Búrca =

Irish chieftain and noble (d.1460)

Thomas Og de Búrca 5th Mac William Iochtar
- Tomás Óg de Búrca
- Arms of Bourke of Mayo
- Died: 1460

Tomás Óg de Búrca, 5th Mac William Íochtar (died 1460) was an Irish chieftain and noble who was lord of Lower (North) Connacht, Ireland.

== Background ==
Tomás was the son of son of Thomas mac Edmond Albanach de Búrca, 2nd Mac William Íochtar (d.1402). He succeeded his brothers, Walter mac Thomas de Búrca, 3rd Mac William Íochtar (d.1440) and Edmund na Féasóige de Búrca, 4th Mac William Íochtar (d.1458) as chieftain in 1458. He was succeeded by his brother, Risdeárd de Búrca, 6th Mac William Íochtar (d.1473).

== Annals of the Four Masters ==
From the Annals of the Four Masters:

- M1460.9. Thomas, the son of Thomas Burke (who became Mac William on the death of Edmond Burke), died.

== Genealogy ==
Mac William Íochtar Genealogy
- Sir Edmond Albanach de Burgh (d. 1375), 1st Mac William Íochtar (Lower Mac William), (Mayo)
  - William de Burgh (d.1368)
  - Thomas mac Edmond Albanach de Búrca, 1375–1402, 2nd Mac William Íochtar
    - Walter mac Thomas de Búrca (d.1440), 3rd Mac William Íochtar
      - Theobald Bourke (d.1503), 8th Mac William Íochtar
        - Meiler Bourke (d.1520), 11th Mac William Íochtar
      - Ricard Bourke (d.1509), 9th Mac William Íochtar
        - Seaán an Tearmainn Bourke (alive 1527), 13th Mac William Íochtar
          - Ricard mac Seaán an Tearmainn Bourke (d.1571), 16th Mac William Íochtar
    - Edmund na Féasóige de Búrca, (d.1458), 4th Mac William Íochtar
      - Ricard Ó Cuairsge Bourke (d.1473), 7th Mac William Íochtar
        - Edmond de Búrca (d.1527), 10th Mac William Íochtar
        - Walter de Búrca
        - Seaán de Búrca
          - Oliver de Búrca
            - Seaán mac Oliver Bourke (d.1580), 17th Mac William Íochtar
            - Richard Bourke (d.1586), 19th Mac William Íochtar
              - Walter Ciotach de Búrca of Belleek (d.1590)
                - Tibbot (Theobald) MacWalter Kittagh Bourke, 21st Mac William Íochtar, 1st Marquess of Mayo
                  - Walter (Balthasar) Bourke, 2nd Marquess of Mayo
      - Thomas Ruadh de Búrca
      - Uilleag de Búrca
        - Edmond de Búrca (d.1527), 12th Mac William Íochtar
          - David de Búrca (alive 1537), 15th Mac William Íochtar
            - Richard the Iron Bourke (d.1583), 18th Mac William Íochtar
              - Tibbot (Theobald) ne Long Bourke (1567-1629), 23rd Mac William Íochtar, 1st Viscount Mayo (1627)
                - Viscounts Mayo
            - William "the Blind Abbot" Bourke (d.1593), 20th Mac William Íochtar
        - Theobald mac Uilleag Bourke (d.1537), 14th Mac William Íochtar
        - Risdeárd de Búrca
          - Ricard Deamhan an Chorráin de Búrca
            - Risdeárd Mac Deamhan an Chorráin (Richard) "the Devils Hook" Bourke (d.1601), 22nd Mac William Íochtar
    - Seaán de Búrca (d.1456)
    - Tomás Óg de Búrca, (d.1460), 5th Mac William Íochtar
    - Risdeárd de Búrca (d.1473), 6th Mac William Íochtar

== See also ==
- House of Burgh, an Anglo-Norman and Hiberno-Norman dynasty founded in 1193

Preceded by Edmund na Féasóige de Búrca	Mac William Iochtar; 1458–1460	Succeeded by Risdeárd de Búrca
