= Risdeárd de Búrca =

Irish chieftain, noble and 6th Mac William Íochtar (d.1473)

Richard de Burgh
- Mac William Íochtar
- Arms of Bourke of Mayo
- Reign: 1460–1469
- Predecessor: Tomás Óg de Búrca
- Successor: Ricard Ó Cuairsge Bourke
- Native name: Risdeárd de Búrca
- Noble family: House of Burgh

Risdeárd de Búrca, 6th Mac William Íochtar (died 1473) was an Irish chieftain and noble.

== Background ==
Risdeárd was the son of Thomas mac Edmond Albanach de Búrca, 2nd Mac William Íochtar (d.1402). He succeeded his brothers, Walter mac Thomas de Búrca, 3rd Mac William Íochtar (d.1440), Edmund na Féasóige de Búrca, 4th Mac William Íochtar (d.1458), and Tomás Óg de Búrca, 5th Mac William Íochtar (d.1460) as chieftain in 1460. Risdeárd was succeeded by Ricard Ó Cuairsge Bourke, 7th Mac William Íochtar (d.1473), the son of Edmund na Féasóige de Búrca, 4th Mac William Íochtar.

== Annals of the Four Masters ==
From the Annals of the Four Masters:

- M1461.12. An army was led by Mac William Burke and his kinsmen into Machaire-Chonnacht, to release Felim Finn from the son of Brian Ballagh; and they gave him his own demand for his ransom, and the chiefs of Connaught as guarantees for the payment of it, whereupon Felim was set at liberty. He took those chieftains with him to Carn-fraoigh-mhic-Fiodhaigh-foltruaidh; and Mac Dermot put on his shoe, after having purchased him; and they obtained the hostages of the descendants of Ona, the son of Aengus, and those of the Hy-Briuin. Mac Williain left these hostages with the son of Brian Ballagh, and returned home. As soon as the sons of O'Conor Roe had heard of this, they ransomed Teige O'Conor from O'Conor Don, by giving the half townland of Baile-an-chlair for him; and they afterwards went over to Conor Mac Branan.
- M1463.7. William Burke, the son of Richard, marched to attack the castle of Muilenn-Adam, in revenge of the loss of his eye. He was pursued to the borders of Ballymote, where he turned round on his pursuers, and killed fifteen of them, with the son of Manus, son of Dermot Mac Donough, and with the sons of O'Neill, who had some time before put his eye out at that castle.
- M1464.24. O'Donnell, Mac William Burke, and many of the Irish and English of Ireland, repaired to Dublin to meet Thomas, Earl of Desmond, at that time Lord Chief Justice of Ireland, and entered into a league of friendship and fealty with him.
- M1466.8. William, son of Walter Burke, and William Burke, son of John, the son of Mac Walter, died.
- M1467.19. O'Kelly and the sons of William Burke were defeated at CrosMoighe-Croin, by Mac William of Clanrickard, and by the O'Briens. William Caech Burke, the son of Mac William, two sons of O'Kelly, Hugh Boy, son of Turlough Mac Donnell, Constable of their Gallowglasses, and ten of the gentlemen of the Clann-Donnell who were along with him, were slain in the conflict. One hundred and sixty gallowglasses, and numbers of others, were also slain. O'Donnell i.e. Hugh Roe, son of Niall Garv, went to Connaught, to take revenge for this defeat, for Mac William and O'Kelly were his friends and confederates. He forced the Clanrickards to make peace, and then returned home in safety.
- M1468.21. Richard Burke went to Moylurg, and made peace with Mac Dermot; and both set out to oppose O'Donnell, but before they could arrive at where he was, he had crossed the Erne, so that they did not meet one another on this occasion. Richard returned to Machaire-Chonnacht, and took hostages from the sons of O'Conor Roe; and he made prisoners of the descendants of Felim, because they would not consent to give him hostages.
- M1469.18. Richard, son of Thomas Burke, resigned his lordship; and Richard, son of Edmund Burke, was appointed in his place.
- M1473.8. Mac William Burke (i.e. Richard) died, having some time before resigned his lordship for the sake of God.

== Genealogy ==
Mac William Íochtar Genealogy
- Sir Edmond Albanach de Burgh (d. 1375), 1st Mac William Íochtar (Lower Mac William), (Mayo)
  - William de Burgh (d.1368)
  - Thomas mac Edmond Albanach de Burca, 1375–1402, 2nd Mac William Íochtar
    - Walter mac Thomas de Burca (d.1440), 3rd Mac William Íochtar
      - Theobald Bourke (d.1503), 8th Mac William Íochtar
        - Meiler Bourke (d.1520), 11th Mac William Íochtar
      - Ricard Bourke (d.1509), 9th Mac William Íochtar
        - Seaán an Tearmainn Bourke (alive 1527), 13th Mac William Íochtar
          - Ricard mac Seaán an Tearmainn Bourke (d.1571), 16th Mac William Íochtar
    - Edmund na Féasóige de Burca, (d.1458), 4th Mac William Íochtar
      - Ricard Ó Cuairsge Bourke (d.1473), 7th Mac William Íochtar
        - Edmond de Burca (d.1527), 10th Mac William Íochtar
        - Walter de Burca
        - Seaán de Burca
          - Oliver de Burca
            - Seaán mac Oliver Bourke (d.1580), 17th Mac William Íochtar
            - Richard Bourke (d.1586), 19th Mac William Íochtar
              - Walter Ciotach de Burca of Belleek (d.1590)
                - Tibbot (Theobald) MacWalter Kittagh Bourke, 21st Mac William Íochtar, 1st Marquess of Mayo
                  - Walter (Balthasar) Bourke, 2nd Marquess of Mayo
      - Thomas Ruadh de Burca
      - Uilleag de Burca
        - Edmond de Burca (d.1527), 12th Mac William Íochtar
          - David de Burca (alive 1537), 15th Mac William Íochtar
            - Richard the Iron Bourke (d.1583), 18th Mac William Íochtar
              - Tibbot (Theobald) ne Long Bourke (1567-1629), 23rd Mac William Íochtar, 1st Viscount Mayo (1627)
                - Viscounts Mayo
            - William "the Blind Abbot" Bourke (d.1593), 20th Mac William Íochtar
        - Theobald mac Uilleag Bourke (d.1537), 14th Mac William Íochtar
        - Risdeárd de Burca
          - Ricard Deamhan an Chorráin de Burca
            - Risdeárd Mac Deamhan an Chorráin (Richard) "the Devils Hook" Bourke (d.1601), 22nd Mac William Íochtar
    - Seaán de Burca (d.1456)
    - Tomás Óg de Burca, (d.1460), 5th Mac William Íochtar
    - Risdeárd de Burca (d.1473), 6th Mac William Íochtar

== See also ==
- House of Burgh, an Anglo-Norman and Hiberno-Norman dynasty founded in 1193

Preceded by Tomás Óg de Burca	Mac William Íochtar; 1460–1469	Succeeded by Ricard Ó Cuairsge Bourke
