= Richard "the Iron" Bourke =

Irish chieftain, noble and 18th Mac William Íochtar (d.1583)

Richard Bourke 18th Mac William Íochtar
- Risdeárd an Iarainn Búrca
- Arms of Bourke of Mayo
- Died: 1583

Richard "the Iron" Bourke (Irish: Risdeárd an Iarainn Bourke; English: /bɜːrk/; BURK; d. 1583), 18th Mac William Íochtar (Lower Mac William), was an Irish chieftain and noble.

== Background ==
Bourke was a son of David de Búrca, 15th Mac William Íochtar, by his second wife, Finola Ni Flaithbertaigh. He succeeded his cousin, Seaán mac Oliver (John) Bourke, 17th Mac William Íochtar (d.1580), a great-grandson of Ricard Ó Cuairsge Bourke, 7th Mac William Íochtar (d.1479).

In English, he was known as Richard Bourke, or "Iron Richard". In medieval Ireland, Richard was a rare name, most found in Norman-origin families like the Bourkes. Richard was second husband to Grace O'Malley. He was the father of several children, including Tibbot ne Long Bourke, 1st Viscount Mayo (23rd Mac William Íochtar) and Nora Bourke (Honoria de Burgo), a lay Dominican Sister who founded a convent close to Burrishoole Friary, County Mayo. Honoria died while attempting to escape from Cromwellian soldiers in 1652.

During the uneven anglicisation of Ireland in the 16th century, by the policy of "Surrender and regrant", Richard signed an agreement with the Crown in 1581 which uniquely left him in autonomous control of his part of County Mayo.

Richard was succeeded, as Mac William Íochtar, by his predecessor's brother, Richard Bourke, 19th Mac William Íochtar (d.1586).

== Genealogy ==
Mac William Íochtar Genealogy
- Sir Edmond Albanach de Burgh (d. 1375), 1st Mac William Íochtar (Lower Mac William), (Mayo)
  - William de Burgh (d.1368)
  - Thomas mac Edmond Albanach de Burca, 1375–1402, 2nd Mac William Íochtar
    - Walter mac Thomas de Burca (d.1440), 3rd Mac William Íochtar
      - Theobald Bourke (d.1503), 8th Mac William Íochtar
        - Meiler Bourke (d.1520), 11th Mac William Íochtar
      - Ricard Bourke (d.1509), 9th Mac William Íochtar
        - Seaán an Tearmainn Bourke (alive 1527), 13th Mac William Íochtar
          - Ricard mac Seaán an Tearmainn Bourke (d.1571), 16th Mac William Íochtar
    - Edmund na Féasóige de Burca, (d.1458), 4th Mac William Íochtar
      - Ricard Ó Cuairsge Bourke (d.1473), 7th Mac William Íochtar
        - Edmond de Burca (d.1527), 10th Mac William Íochtar
        - Walter de Burca
        - Seaán de Burca
          - Oliver de Burca
            - Seaán mac Oliver Bourke (d.1580), 17th Mac William Íochtar
            - Richard Bourke (d.1586), 19th Mac William Íochtar
              - Walter Ciotach de Burca of Belleek (d.1590)
                - Tibbot (Theobald) MacWalter Kittagh Bourke, 21st Mac William Íochtar, 1st Marquess of Mayo
                  - Walter (Balthasar) Bourke, 2nd Marquess of Mayo
      - Thomas Ruadh de Burca
      - Uilleag de Burca
        - Edmond de Burca (d.1527), 12th Mac William Íochtar
          - David de Burca (alive 1537), 15th Mac William Íochtar
            - Richard the Iron Bourke (d.1583), 18th Mac William Íochtar
              - Tibbot (Theobald) ne Long Bourke (1567-1629), 23rd Mac William Íochtar, 1st Viscount Mayo (1627)
                - Viscounts Mayo
            - William "the Blind Abbot" Bourke (d.1593), 20th Mac William Íochtar
        - Theobald mac Uilleag Bourke (d.1537), 14th Mac William Íochtar
        - Risdeárd de Burca
          - Ricard Deamhan an Chorráin de Burca
            - Risdeárd Mac Deamhan an Chorráin (Richard) "the Devils Hook" Bourke (d.1601), 22nd Mac William Íochtar
    - Seaán de Burca (d.1456)
    - Tomás Óg de Burca, (d.1460), 5th Mac William Íochtar
    - Risdeárd de Burca (d.1473), 6th Mac William Íochtar

== See also ==
- House of Burgh, an Anglo-Norman and Hiberno-Norman dynasty founded in 1193

Preceded by Seaán mac Oliver Bourke	Mac William Iochtar; 1580–1582	Succeeded by Richard Bourke
