= Theobald Bourke, 3rd Viscount Mayo =

Irish soldier, landowner, and peer (died 1653)

The Right Honourable The Viscount Mayo

Member of the Irish House of Lords
- Hereditary Peerage; 1649–1653
- Preceded by: Miles Bourke
- Succeeded by: Theobald Bourke

Member of Parliament for County Mayo
- In office 1640–1649

Personal details
- Born: Theobald Bourke
- Died: January 15, 1653 Galway
- Spouse(s): (1) Elizabeth Talbot; (2) Eleanor FitzGerald
- Children: Theobald Bourke, Miles Bourke, Margaret Bourke and Maud Bourke
- Parents: Miles Burke, 2nd Viscount Mayo; Honora Bourke

Theobald Bourke, 3rd Viscount Mayo (died 15 January 1653) was an Irish soldier, landowner, member of the Irish House of Commons, and peer. As Viscount Mayo in the peerage of Ireland, he had a seat in the Irish House of Lords from 1649 until his death.

== Life ==
The son and heir of Miles Burke, 2nd Viscount Mayo, by his first wife Honora, Bourke was reported to have been educated at Oxford, which at the time was open only to Anglicans. Like his father, he was said to have been created a Baronet (Scotland) about 1638. As Sir Theobald Bourke, he was one of the two Members of Parliament for County Mayo from 1640 to 1649, when he succeeded his father in the Lords; he distinguished himself in the Royal cause during the Wars of the Three Kingdoms.

He married twice: firstly after September 1634, Elizabeth Talbot, daughter of Thomas Talbot and Anne Fleetwood; secondly Eleanor, daughter of Sir Luke FitzGerald, of Tecroghan, County Meath, by Mary, daughter of Nicholas, 1st Viscount Netterville.

He had four children with Elizabeth Talbot; his heir Theobald Bourke the fourth Viscount Mayo, Miles Bourke the fifth Viscount Mayo, Margaret Bourke who married Sir Henry Lynch, 3rd Baronet, and Maud Bourke.

His daughter Maud married Colonel John Browne who built the first Westport House.

== Execution ==
In December 1652, Mayo was found guilty by Cromwell's High Court of Justice in Connaught, of murders committed in the 'late rebellion', and was “ shot to death,” 15 January I652/3, at Galway, and buried there. His widow died in 1693.

== Arms ==
Coat of arms of Theobald Bourke, 3rd Viscount Mayo
Crest On a Chapeau Gules, turned up Ermine, a Lion sejant Argent, langued Gules, ducally gorged Or. Escutcheon Party per fess Or and Ermine, a cross gules, in the first quarter a lion rampant sable and in the 2nd a dexter Hand affrontée, both Sable. Supporters Dexter: A Harpy guardant wings and lions body Or, human face neck chest and hair proper, armed Gules; Sinister: A Man in Armour to the middle of his thigh, Sword proper, suspended from a Belt Gules, about his head a square White Band, sandles Sable, in the exterior hand a Battle-Axe proper. Motto A CRUCE SALUS (Salvation from the Cross)

== See also ==
- House of Burgh, an Anglo-Norman and Hiberno-Norman dynasty founded in 1193
- Mac William Íochtar

Peerage of Ireland
Preceded by Miles Bourke	Viscount Mayo; 1649–1653	Succeeded by Theobald Bourke
