= David Murphy (composer) =

David Murphy (fl. early 17th century) was an Irish composer and harper.

== Life ==
Murphy, a native of County Mayo, is one of two men credited by Captain Francis O'Neill with composing the air, An Tighearna Mhaigheo/Lord Mayo (the other being Thady Ó Cianáin).

O'Neill gives this account of its composition:

"The circumstances which led to its inspiration were as follows: David Murphy undoubtedly a man of genius, who had been taken under the protection of Lord Mayo (Tiobóid na Long Bourke, 1st Viscount Mayo, 1567–1629) through benevolent motives, incurred his patron’s displeasure by some misconduct. Anxious to propitiate his Lordship, Murphy consulted a friend, Capt. Finn, of Boyle, Roscommon. The latter suggested that an ode expressive of his patron’s praise, and his own penitence, would be the most likely to bring about the desired reconciliation."

"The result was in the words of the learned Charles O’Conor, “the birth of one of the finest productions for sentiment and harmony, that ever did honor to any country.”"

"Apprehensive that the most humble advances would not soften his Lordship’s resentment. Murphy concealed himself after nightfall in Lord Mayo’s hall on Christmas Eve, and at an auspicious moment poured forth his very soul in words and music, conjuring him by the birth of the Prince of Peace, to grant him forgiveness in a strain of the finest and most natural pathos that ever distilled from the pen of man. Two stanzas will show the character of his alternating sentiments.

- Mayo whose valor sweeps the field
- And swells the trump of Fame;
- May Heaven's high power thy champion shield,
- And deathless be his name.
- O! bid the exiled Bard return,
- Too long from safety fled;
- No more in absence let him mourn
- Till earth shall hide his head.
