= Baron Ardenerie =

Title in the Peerage of Ireland

Baron Ardenerie Barún Ardenerie
- Arms: of Bourke: Party per fess Or and Ermine, a cross gules the first quarter charged with a lion rampant sable and the second with a dexter hand couped at the wrist and erect gules.
- Creation date: May 1580
- Created by: Elizabeth I
- Peerage: Peerage of Ireland
- First holder: John Bourke
- Last holder: William Bourke
- Status: Dormant
- Extinction date: 1591

Baron Ardenerie (Irish: Barún Ardenerie; English: /ˈɑːrdnæriːə/ ARD-nar-EE-eh) was a title in the Peerage of Ireland derived from Ardnaree in County Mayo. It was created in May 1580 for John Bourke, who died on 24 November of that year, and became dormant in 1591 on the death of the second Baron.

== Barons Ardenerie (1580) ==
- John Bourke, 1st Baron Ardenerie (died 1580)
- William Bourke, 2nd Baron Ardenerie (1560–1591)

== See also ==
- House of Burgh, an Anglo-Norman and Hiberno-Norman dynasty founded in 1193
