= Thady Ó Cianáin =

Irish composer

Thady Ó Cianáin (or Thady Keenan) was an Irish composer of the early 17th century.

A member of the Ó Cianáin family, he is famous as the composer of the tune "An Tighearna Mhaigheo"/"Lord Mayo". However, Captain Francis O'Neill credited one David Murphy, as its composer.
