= Mac William Íochtar =

Irish family of chieftains and nobles in Connacht, Ireland

Lower Mac William Mac William Íochtar
- c. 1330–1602
- Coat of arms

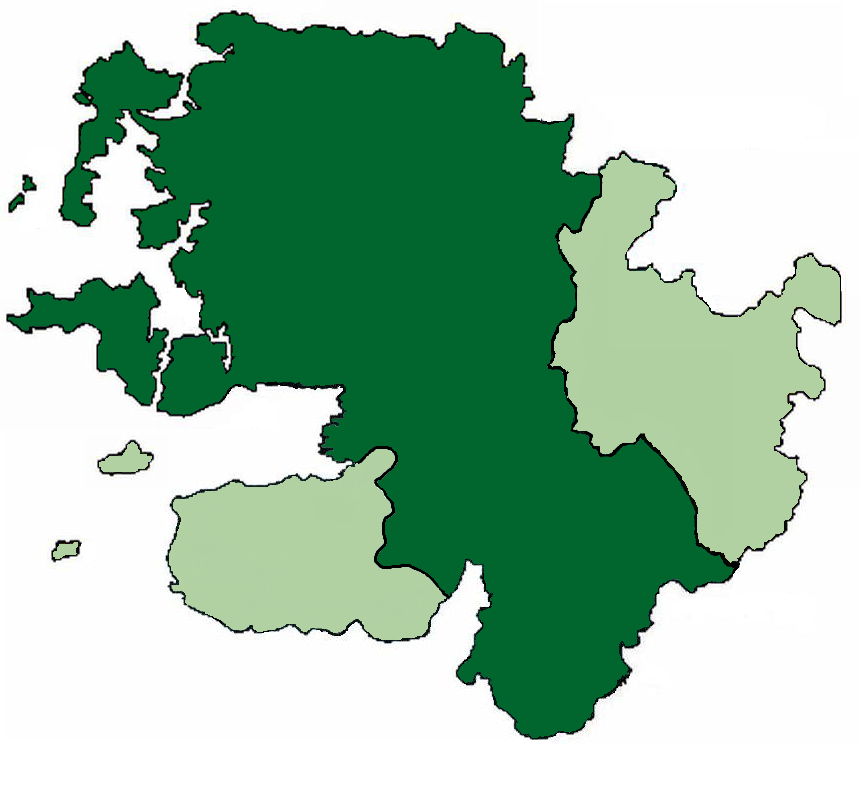
- County Mayo, c. 1590; Mac William Íochtar territory (dark green); Vassals of Mac William Íochtar (light green)
- Capital: Kilmaine (inauguration site)
- Common languages: Irish
- Religion: Roman Catholicism
- Government: Tanistry
- Chief
  - 1332–1375: Edmond Albanach de Burgh
  - 1595–1602: Tibbot MacWalter Kittagh Bourke
- History
  - Established: c. 1330
  - Disestablished: 1602
- ISO 3166 code: IE
Preceded by	Succeeded by
House of Burke	County Mayo; Kingdom of Ireland

Mac William Íochtar (Lower Mac William), also known as the Mayo Burkes, were a fully Gaelicised branch of the Hiberno-Norman House of Burgh in Ireland. Mayo covered much of the northern part of the province of Connacht and the Mac William Íochtar functioned as a regional king and received the White Rod. The title was a successor office to the Lord of Connacht which ended upon the assassination of William Donn de Burgh, 3rd Earl of Ulster, in June 1333.

== History ==
As a result of the Burke Civil War of the 1330s, the Lordship of Connacht was split between two opposing factions of the de Burgh family: the Burkes of Mac William Uachtar (or Clanricarde) in southern Connacht and the Mac William Íochtar Burkes of northern Connacht. For over three hundred years, the two families dominated the politics of the province, frequently fighting each other for supreme rule of both the Anglo-Irish and Gaelic-Irish peoples.

== List of Mac William Íochtar ==
- Edmond Albanach de Burgh, 1st Mac William Íochtar (1332–1334), died November 1375
- Thomas mac Edmond Albanach de Búrca, 2nd Mac William Íochtar (1375–1402)
- Walter mac Thomas de Búrca, 3rd Mac William Íochtar (1402– 7 September 1440)
- Edmund na Féasóige de Búrca, 4th Mac William Íochtar (1440–1458)
- Tomás Óg de Búrca, 5th Mac William Íochtar (1458–1460)
- Risdeárd de Búrca, 6th Mac William Íochtar (1460–1469), died 1473
- Ricard Ó Cuairsge Bourke, 7th Mac William Íochtar (1469–1473), died 1479
- Theobald Bourke, 8th Mac William Íochtar (1479–5 March 1503)
- Ricard Bourke, 9th Mac William Íochtar (1503–7 July 1509)
- Edmond de Búrca, 10th Mac William Íochtar (1509–23 February 1514)
- Meiler Bourke, 11th Mac William Íochtar (1514–28 April 1520)
- Edmond de Búrca, 12th Mac William Íochtar (1520–29 September 1527)
- Seaán an Tearmainn Bourke, 13th Mac William Íochtar (1527–?)
- Theobald mac Uilleag Bourke, 14th Mac William Íochtar (?–1537)
- David de Búrca, 15th Mac William Íochtar (1537–?)
- Ricard mac Seaán an Tearmainn Bourke, 16th Mac William Íochtar (?–1571)
- Seaán mac Oliver Bourke, 17th Mac William Íochtar (1571–1580) and Baron Ardenerie (1580)
- Richard the Iron Bourke, 18th Mac William Íochtar (1580–1582)
- Richard Bourke, 19th Mac William Íochtar (1582–1586)
- William "the Blind Abbot" Bourke, 20th Mac William Íochtar (1586–Abolition, 1593)
- Tibbot MacWalter Kittagh Bourke, 21st Mac William Íochtar (Restoration, December 1595–March 1601) and Marquess of Mayo (Peerage of Spain, 1602)
- Richard "the Devils Hook" Bourke, 22nd Mac William Íochtar (March 1601–October 1601)
- Tibbot ne Long Bourke, 23rd Mac William Íochtar (October 1601–Abolition, January 1602) and Viscount Mayo (1637)

In 1594, Tibbot ne Long Bourke, one of the most prominent men in the country and son of Richard "the Iron" Bourke, 18th Mac William Íochtar (d.1582), accepted terms of surrender and regrant. In 1627, he was created Viscount Mayo.

== Genealogy ==
de Burgh Genealogy
- Walter de Burgh of Burgh Castle, Norfolk m. Alice
  - William de Burgh (d. 1206) m. Daughter of Domnall Mór Ó Briain, King of Thomond
    - Richard Mór / Óge de Burgh, 1st Lord of Connaught m. Egidia de Lacy, Lady of Connacht
      - Sir Richard de Burgh (d.1248), 2nd Lord of Connaught
      - Walter de Burgh, 1st Earl of Ulster (d. 1271)
        - Richard Óg de Burgh, 2nd Earl of Ulster (1259–1326)
          - John de Burgh m. Elizabeth de Clare
            - William Donn de Burgh, 3rd Earl of Ulster (1312–33) m. Maud of Lancaster
              - Elizabeth de Burgh, 4th Countess of Ulster (1332–63) m. Lionel of Antwerp, 1st Duke of Clarence
                - Philippa Plantagenet, 5th Countess of Ulster (1355–82) m. Edmund Mortimer, 3rd Earl of March
                - Roger Mortimer, 4th Earl of March, 6th Earl of Ulster (1374–98)
                  - Edmund Mortimer, 5th Earl of March, 7th Earl of Ulster (1391–1425)
                  - Anne Mortimer (1388–1411) m. Richard of Conisburgh, 3rd Earl of Cambridge
                    - Richard of York, 3rd Duke of York, 8th Earl of Ulster (1411–60)
                      - Edward IV (Edward, 4th Duke of York, 9th Earl of Ulster)
                        - House of York (Kings and Queens of England and Ireland)
          - Edmond de Burgh
            - Sir Richard Burke
              - Walter Burke (d. 1432)
                - Burkes of Castleconnell and Brittas (Clanwilliam)
              - Uileag Carragh Burke
                - Burkes of Cois tSiúire (Clanwilliam)
            - Sir David Burke,
              - Burkes of Muskerryquirk (Clanwilliam)
          - Elizabeth, Queen of Scotland m. Robert I of Scotland
        - Theobald de Burgh
        - William de Burgh
        - Thomas de Burgh
        - Egidia de Burgh
      - William Óg de Burgh (d. 1270)
        - William Liath de Burgh (d. 1324)
          - Sir Walter Liath de Burgh, d. 1332
          - Sir Edmond Albanach de Burgh (d. 1375), 1st Mac William Íochtar (Lower Mac William), (Mayo)
            - Mac William Íochtars, Viscounts Mayo and Earls of Mayo
          - John de Burgh (1350–98), Chancellor of the University of Cambridge
          - Richard an Fhorbhair de Burgh
            - Sir Ulick de Burgh (d. 1343/53), 1st Mac William Uachtar (Upper Mac William) or Clanricarde (Galway)
              - Richard Óg Burke (d. 1387)
                - Ulick an Fhiona Burke
                  - Clanricardes, Earls of Marquesses of Clanricarde
            - Raymond de Burgh
            - Walter Óge de Burgh
          - Raymund de Burgh
          - Ulick de Burgh of Umhall
      - Alice de Burgh
      - Margery de Burgh
      - Matilda de Burgh
      - Daughter de Burgh
    - Hubert de Burgh, Bishop of Limerick (d. 1250)
    - William de Burgh, Sheriff of Connacht
  - Hubert de Burgh, 1st Earl of Kent (d. 1243) m.
    - John de Burgh
    - Hubert de Burgh
    - Hubert de Burgh
      - Barons Burgh
  - Geoffrey de Burgh, Bishop of Ely (d. 1228)
  - Thomas de Burgh
Mac William Íochtar Genealogy
- Sir Edmond Albanach de Burgh (d. 1375), 1st Mac William Íochtar (Lower Mac William), (Mayo)
  - William de Burgh (d.1368)
  - Thomas mac Edmond Albanach de Burca, 1375–1402, 2nd Mac William Íochtar
    - Walter mac Thomas de Burca (d.1440), 3rd Mac William Íochtar
      - Theobald Bourke (d.1503), 8th Mac William Íochtar
        - Meiler Bourke (d.1520), 11th Mac William Íochtar
      - Ricard Bourke (d.1509), 9th Mac William Íochtar
        - Seaán an Tearmainn Bourke (alive 1527), 13th Mac William Íochtar
          - Ricard mac Seaán an Tearmainn Bourke (d.1571), 16th Mac William Íochtar
    - Edmund na Féasóige de Burca, (d.1458), 4th Mac William Íochtar
      - Ricard Ó Cuairsge Bourke (d.1473), 7th Mac William Íochtar
        - Edmond de Burca, 10th Mac William Íochtar
        - Walter de Burca
        - Seaán de Burca
          - Oliver de Burca
            - Seaán mac Oliver Bourke (d.1580), 17th Mac William Íochtar
            - Richard Bourke (d.1586), 19th Mac William Íochtar
              - Walter Ciotach de Burca of Belleek (d.1590)
                - Tibbot (Theobald) MacWalter Kittagh Bourke, 21st Mac William Íochtar, 1st Marquess of Mayo
                  - Walter (Balthasar) Bourke, 2nd Marquess of Mayo
      - Thomas Ruadh de Burca
      - Uilleag de Burca
        - Edmond de Burca (d.1527), 12th Mac William Íochtar
          - David de Burca (alive 1537), 15th Mac William Íochtar
            - Richard the Iron Bourke (d.1583), 18th Mac William Íochtar
              - Tibbot (Theobald) ne Long Bourke (1567-1629), 23rd Mac William Íochtar, 1st Viscount Mayo (1627)
                - Viscounts Mayo
            - William "the Blind Abbot" Bourke (d.1593), 20th Mac William Íochtar
        - Theobald mac Uilleag Bourke (d.1537), 14th Mac William Íochtar
        - Risdeárd de Burca
          - Ricard Deamhan an Chorráin de Burca
            - Risdeárd Mac Deamhan an Chorráin (Richard) "the Devils Hook" Bourke (d.1601), 22nd Mac William Íochtar
    - Seaán de Burca (d.1456)
    - Tomás Óg de Burca, (d.1460), 5th Mac William Íochtar
    - Risdeárd de Burca (d.1473), 6th Mac William Íochtar

== See also ==
- County Mayo
- Earl of Mayo
- Viscount Mayo
- Marquess of Sligo
- Baron Connemara
- Carter-Campbell of Possil
- House of Burgh, an Anglo-Norman and Hiberno-Norman dynasty founded in 1193
- Burke Civil War 1333–38
- Clanricarde (Mac William Uachtar/Upper Mac William) or Galway (Upper Connaught) Burkes
- Earl of Clanricarde
