= Niamh de Búrca =

Irish traditional and folk singer

- Known for: Singer

Niamh de Búrca, is an Irish traditional and folk singer who helped promote the use of the Irish language in music.

== Biography ==
De Búrca has worked and recorded with a wide range of musical groups. De Búrca released her solo album, An áit a bhfuil do chroí . . .Where your heart lies in 2006. The album included songs dating back to the 17th century and more which De Búrca's mother, Síghle, taught her.

De Búrca was selected by TG4 to work with other experts in the selection of the traditional Irish music award, Gradam Ceoil, recipients. A fluent Irish speaker and proponent of the Irish language De Búrca worked with Gael Linn for 43 years until she retired from her post in 2019. She was responsible for the Siansa Gael Linn competition.
