= Theobald Bourke, 1st Viscount Mayo =

Irish nobleman and politician (c. 1567 – 1629)

Theobald Bourke
- Signature, 1593

1st Viscount Mayo
- Reign: June 1627 – June 1629
- Predecessor: Title Created
- Successor: Miles Bourke, 2nd Viscount Mayo
- Born: c. 1567; At sea
- Died: 18 June 1629 (aged 61–62); County Mayo, Ireland
- Burial: Ballintubber Abbey, County Mayo
- Consort: Maeve O'Conor
- Issue: 8
- House: (Burgh (Mac William Íochtar)
- Father: Risdeárd an Iarainn Bourke (d. 1583)
- Mother: Gráinne O'Malley (d. 1603)
- Religion: Catholic

Theobald Bourke, 1st Viscount Mayo (Irish: Tibbott na Long Bourke, Teabóid na Long Bourke; English: /bɜːrk/; BURK; 1567 – 18 June 1629) was an Irish peer and parliamentarian. A prominent member of the MacWilliam Burkes of County Mayo, Tibbot was a Member of the Irish House of Commons and was later created the first Viscount Mayo. His successful life followed, and usefully illustrates, the difficult transition for Irish aristocrats from the traditional Gaelic world during the Tudor conquest of Ireland.

Bourke's name had varying spellings such as "Teabóid" or "Tepóitt" in medieval Irish. Tibbot derived from Thibault, the French for Theobald; and "na Long" meant "of the ships", as he was born on a ship. This was usually rendered in Tudor English as: Tibbott or Tibbot na Long.

== MacWilliam lordships ==
Tibbot's Irish ancestors started with William de Burgh who was granted the overlordship of Connacht in 1215 by John Lackland. William's son Richard (d.1243) took actual possession of much of the province in the 13th century. His descent then divided their lands into:

- Mac William Uachtar (Upper) or Clanricarde, based in County Galway
- Mac William Íochtar (Lower), based in County Mayo

These branches held their lands against Gaelic and Norman opponents in the following centuries and were typical of the Hiberno-Norman families who intermarried locally and had adopted Gaelic culture by the 1400s (see Gaelic Resurgence).

== Early life ==
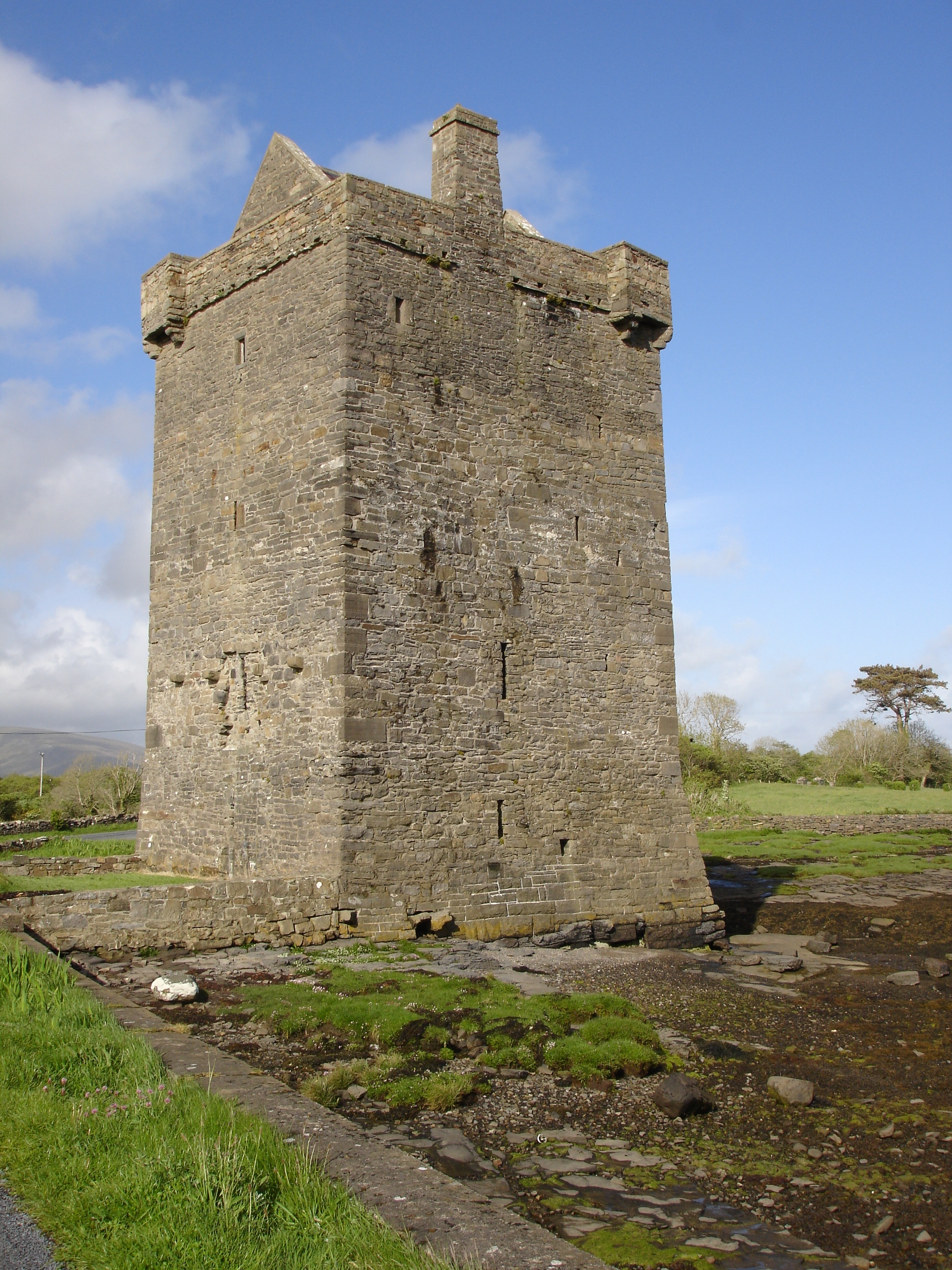
Rockfleet Castle, main base of Risteard an Iarainn

His mother was the pirate queen Gráinne O'Malley (1530–1603) and his father was Richard "the Iron" Bourke, 18th Mac William Íochtar (d.1583), who was her second husband, and a senior member of the Lower MacWilliam Burke clan. Both parents owned lands along the west coast of County Mayo. Tibbot was born at sea, supposedly just before his mother's fleet engaged in a sea battle with Barbary pirates.

Tibbot married Maeve, daughter of Donal/Domnhnall O'Conor Sligo, in 1585, and they had eight children.

== Lower MacWilliam lordship, 1576–1592 ==
From 1541 the new Kingdom of Ireland founded by Henry VIII attempted to involve and include the self-governing chiefdoms by the process of surrender and regrant. After the first Desmond Rebellion (1569–76) the Dublin administration decided to apply the process in Connacht to the autonomous chiefs such as the Lower MacWilliam Bourke, but with considerable difficulty. By this stage the clan owned most of the western half of County Mayo. In contrast, an Upper MacWilliam cousin in County Galway had been created Earl of Clanricarde in 1543.

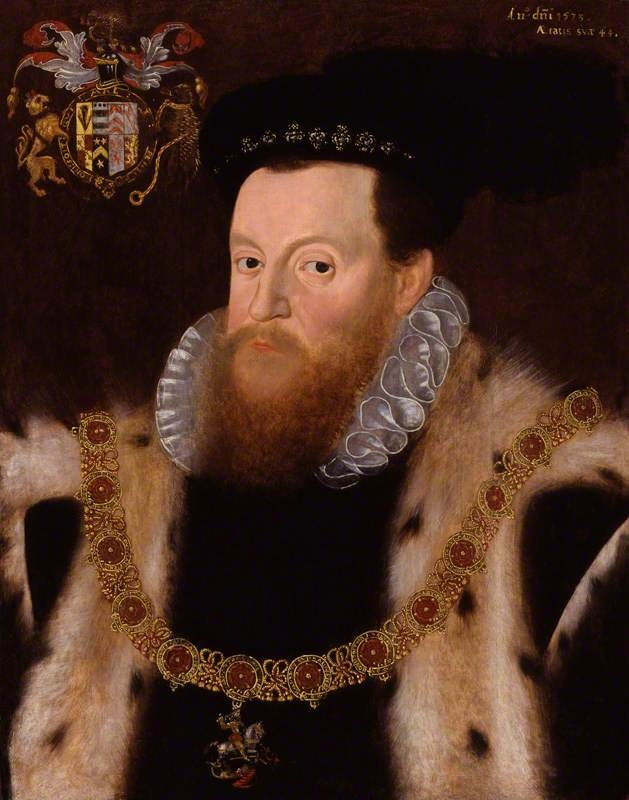
Sir Henry Sidney, 1573

In 1576 Tibbot's mother submitted to Sir Henry Sidney, the Lord Deputy of Ireland, in respect of her own lands. However, in the Lower MacWilliam Burke clan Risteard an Iarainn was the tanist, elected by the clan as the next heir to the current chief, Shane Burke. If the clan adopted surrender and regrant, Richard would lose his expected chieftainship, and Shane's son would inherit under the English-law doctrine of primogeniture. Richard therefore sided with the Earl of Desmond, then Sidney's main opponent, while his wife Grace plundered Desmond's lands with her fleet of ships in 1577 and was taken prisoner by him until 1579.

In November 1580 Richard made a favourable peace with Grey, the next lord deputy, having mustered a show of force. At the time Grey was fully engaged in crushing the Second Desmond Rebellion. Richard was now recognised as an autonomous clan chief by the Crown, uniquely without having to adopt surrender and regrant, in a deed dated 16 April 1581.

By 1585 Grace was ruling the Lower MacWilliam Burke lordship with Tibbot, now aged 19. That year the next lord deputy, Sir John Perrott, decided to secure the province in the "Composition of Connaught" and Tibbot was taken hostage to ensure Grace's compliance with the Composition. While a prisoner Tibbot learnt English and married Maeve, daughter of Donal O'Conor Sligo.

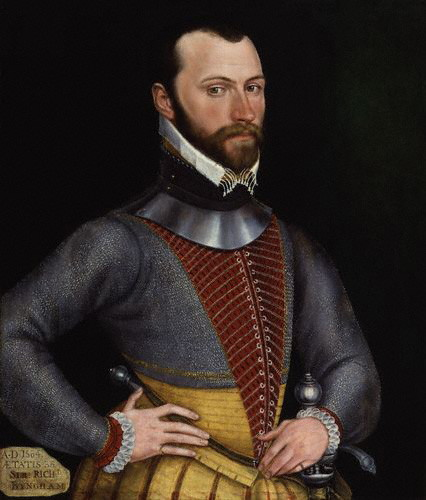
Sir Richard Bingham

In 1586 the Lower MacWilliam clan remained divided over Perrott's opinion on the clan succession. Tibbot was freed by Richard Bingham to help Perrott's policy, but joined in the rebellion. By 1587 he sought a truce, followed by another rebellion in 1589 and a final peace in March 1590. By this point he was the recognised clan chief, and accepted the terms of the composition, paying his arrears of chief rent to the Crown.

However, on the escape of Red Hugh O'Donnell from Dublin Castle in 1592, Tibbot raised Mayo in his support. His attacks on Bingham's force were beaten off, no promised Spanish help arrived and O'Donnell sued for peace. Tibbot "was left high and dry" by O'Donnell, but was granted another pardon.

== Nine Years' War ==
- For a more detailed account of his activities during the war, see the life of his rival: Tibbot MacWalter Kittagh Bourke

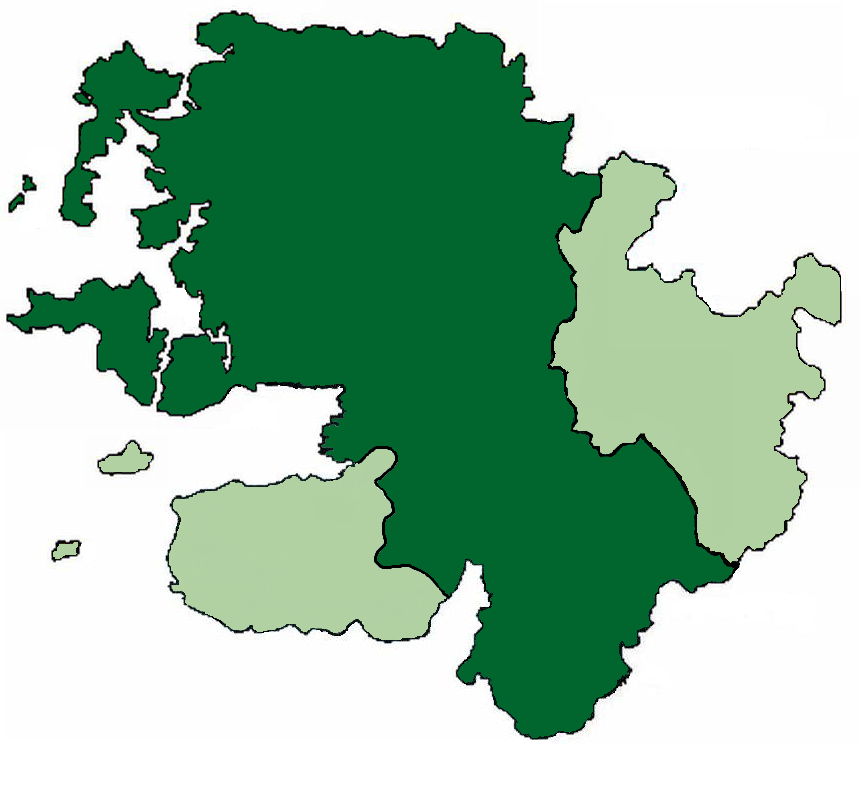
Extent of the Mac William Iochtar Territory within County Mayo, c. 1590

On the approach to the Nine Years' War in early 1593, conflict had broken out between the Presidency of Connaught and Hugh Roe O'Donnell of Tyrconnell and Brian Óg O'Rourke of West Breifne. In a letter to O'Rourke, Tibbot vowed to raise an army in Mayo which could coordinate with the rebellious kings of Ulster, if O'Rourke could keep up his war against Bingham for another month. This led to Tibbot's arrest in May 1593 and he was held at Athlone. His mother Grace visited Queen Elizabeth in London in June 1593 and obtained his release. Tibbot agreed to fight some of his Burke cousins who were rebelling, while his son Miles was held as a hostage by Bingham.

In April 1594 Grace visited Elizabeth again, and finally secured favourable terms of surrender and regrant for Tibbot. The timing of this visit subsequently made a huge difference to him, as the Nine Years' War was starting; as a result The O'Donnell arranged in 1595 for another MacWilliam Burke cousin, Tibbot Kittagh, to replace him as clan chief. Tibbot soon regained his position in Mayo, and unsurprisingly would not join O'Donnell and his main ally Hugh O'Neill in the war. He initially assisted the English government under Clifford, before taking a less active role in the war. Clifford was then totally defeated in 1599 at the Battle of Curlew Pass. While the rebels marched south to their eventual defeat at Kinsale in 1601, he embarked 300 men into three ships, sailed south, and kept both sides guessing who he would help.

== 1600s ==
In 1603 James I succeeded Elizabeth and O'Neill submitted to the terms of the Treaty of Mellifont. The following year he was knighted, styled as "Sir Tibbot ne Longe Bourke". For the first time Ireland was completely under English control. After the Flight of the Earls in 1607, Tibbot was accused of plotting to help them, and was arrested again in 1608; this proved unfounded. In 1610 he was again under suspicion, as the administration intercepted letters from Spain hoping to implicate him in a revolt; yet again he was pardoned.

He also represented the smaller local clans in their property registration dealings with the Dublin administration, but seems to have ended up with most of their lands by his death. His own tenants paid rent in kind under the metayage system, known in Ireland as "cuttings and spendings", delivering him about a quarter or third of each crop. Given the wet Irish climate, this method was probably more realistic than expecting a fixed cash rent. His son Miles received such an annual rent from Murrisk in 1633: £3 in cash, a beef animal, 40 quarts of butter, a basin of meal and a basin of malt.

== 1613–1629 ==
Arms of Bourke, Viscount Mayo

In 1613–15 Tibbot was one of the two MPs from Mayo in the Parliament of Ireland. Being still Catholic, he voted against the creation of new boroughs for Protestant MPs; the new rules gave Protestants a majority of 108–102 in the Commons.

The Anglo-Spanish War (1625–30) started soon after the accession of Charles I, and yet again he and his son Miles were charged with planning a Spanish-supported Catholic revolt, and were cleared. Soon after this he was created the 1st Viscount Mayo in June 1627, with his first name by now given as Theobald. In 1628 he and other Catholic nobles started a petition campaign to persuade King Charles to reform some anti-Catholic laws, known as "The Graces". He died on 18 June 1629 and was buried at Ballintubber Abbey.

While Tibbot remained Catholic, he ensured that for political reasons his son Miles conformed to the Anglican church and was educated at Oxford University, while his other children remained Catholic.

== Family ==
Tibbot married in 1585 to Maeve/Maud, daughter of Charles O'Conor Sligo (died 1636). They had several daughters and four sons:

Miles, 2nd viscount, d.1649; m. 1stly Honora Burke; 2ndly Isabella Freake
David, died childless in 1677; m. 1stly Mary O'Donnell; 2ndly Miss Howard
Theobald Riabach, d. 1654 in Spain; m. Miss Burke of Turlough
Richard, m. Anne McMahon

Miles's descendants ran down to the 8th viscount, who died in 1767. Thereafter three of Richard's descendants were potential claimants until 1814, but never took their seats in parliament.

== An Tighearna Mhaigheo/Lord Mayo ==
David Murphy, a native of County Mayo, is one of two men credited by Captain Francis O'Neill with composing the air, An Tighearna Mhaigheo/Lord Mayo (the other being Thady Ó Cianáin).

O'Neill gives this account of its composition:

"The circumstances which led to its inspiration were as follows: David Murphy undoubtedly a man of genius, who had been taken under the protection of Lord Mayo (Tibbet na Long Bourke, 1st Viscount Mayo, 1567–1629) through benevolent motives, incurred his patron’s displeasure by some misconduct. Anxious to propitiate his Lordship, Murphy consulted a friend, Capt. Finn, of Boyle, Roscommon. The latter suggested that an ode expressive of his patron’s praise, and his own penitence, would be the most likely to bring about the desired reconciliation."

"The result was in the words of the learned Charles O’Conor, "the birth of one of the finest productions for sentiment and harmony, that ever did honor to any country"."

"Apprehensive that the most humble advances would not soften his Lordship’s resentment. Murphy concealed himself after nightfall in Lord Mayo’s hall on Christmas Eve, and at an auspicious moment poured forth his very soul in words and music, conjuring him by the birth of the Prince of Peace, to grant him forgiveness in a strain of the finest and most natural pathos that ever distilled from the pen of man. Two stanzas will show the character of his alternating sentiments.

Mayo whose valor sweeps the field
And swells the trump of Fame;
May Heaven's high power thy champion shield,
And deathless be his name.

O! bid the exiled Bard return,
Too long from safety fled;
No more in absence let him mourn
Till earth shall hide his head.

== Arms ==
Coat of arms of Theobald Bourke, 1st Viscount Mayo
Crest On a Chapeau Gules, turned up Ermine, a Lion sejant Argent, langued Gules, ducally gorged Or. Escutcheon Party per fess Or and Ermine, a cross gules, in the first quarter a lion rampant sable and in the 2nd a dexter Hand affrontée, both Sable. Supporters Dexter: A Harpy guardant wings and lions body Or, human face neck chest and hair proper, armed Gules; Sinister: A Man in Armour to the middle of his thigh, Sword proper, suspended from a Belt Gules, about his head a square White Band, sandles Sable, in the exterior hand a Battle-Axe proper. Motto A CRUCE SALUS (Salvation from the Cross)

== See also ==
- House of Burgh, an Anglo-Norman and Hiberno-Norman dynasty founded in 1193
- Burke Civil War 1333–38
- Earl of Mayo
- Mac William Uachtar (Clanricarde)
- Ireland 1536–1691

Preceded by Risdeárd mac Deamhain an Chorráin Bourke	Mac William Iochtar; 1583–1627	Succeeded by None
Peerage of Ireland
New creation	Viscount Mayo; 1627–1629	Succeeded by Miles Bourke
