= Viscount Mayo =

Title twice created in the Peerage of Ireland

Viscountcy of Mayo Bíocuntacht Mhaigh Eo
- Arms: Per fess Or and Ermine, a Cross Gules, in the 1st quarter a Lion rampant and in the 2nd a dexter Hand affrontée, both Sable. Crest: On a Chapeau Gules, turned up Ermine, a Lion sejant Argent, langued Gules, ducally gorged Or. Supporters: Dexter: A Harpy guardant wings and lions body Or, human face neck chest and hair proper, armed Gules; Sinister: A Man in Armour to the middle of his thigh, Sword proper, suspended from a Belt Gules, about his head a square White Band, sandles Sable, in the exterior hand a Battle-Axe proper.
- Creation date: 21 June 1627
- Creation: First
- Created by: King Charles I
- Peerage: Peerage of Ireland
- First holder: Tiobóid na Long Bourke, 1st Viscount Mayo
- Last holder: John Bourke, 8th Viscount Mayo
- Remainder to: The 1st Earl’s heirs male of the body lawfully begotten
- Subsidiary titles: Baronet ‘of Mayo’ Baronet ‘of Brittas’
- Status: Extinct
- Extinction date: 12 January 1767
- Motto: AUDACES FORTUNA JUVAT (Fortune favours the brave)

Viscount Mayo (Irish: Bíocunta Mhaigh Eo) is a title that has been created twice in the Peerage of Ireland, both times for members of the Bourke family. The first creation came in 1627 in favour of Tiobóid na Long Bourke, also known as Theobald Bourke. He was the son of Sir Richard Bourke, 18th lord of Mac William Iochtar (Lower Mac William), and Gráinne O'Malley. Miles, the 2nd Viscount, was created a baronet in the Baronetage of Nova Scotia in c. 1638.

His son Theobald, the third Viscount, was also created a Baronet in the Baronetage of Nova Scotia in c. 1638 (although there are no records of this creation in the Great Seal). The third Viscount was executed in 1652 after being found guilty of murder by Cromwell's High Court of Justice in Connaught. The murders in 1642 became known as the "Shrule massacre", but it seems that Lord Mayo had done his best to prevent them.

The third Viscount's daughter Maud married Col. John Browne, ancestor of the Marquesses of Sligo.

On the eighth Viscount's death in 1767, the title became dormant or extinct. Historian Anne Chambers considers that a legal right continued, but that the next claimant could not afford the legal costs involved in presenting a petition to the Irish House of Lords.

The title was recreated for a very distant cousin, John Bourke, 1st Baron Naas, in 1781. He was subsequently created Earl of Mayo in 1785. See this title for more information.

== Viscounts Mayo: First creation (1627) ==
- Tiobóid na Long Bourke, 1st Viscount Mayo (died 1629)
- Miles Bourke, 2nd Viscount Mayo (died 1649)
- Theobald Bourke, 3rd Viscount Mayo (died 1652)
- Theobald Bourke, 4th Viscount Mayo (died 1676)
- Miles Bourke, 5th Viscount Mayo (died 1681)
- Theobald Bourke, 6th Viscount Mayo (1681–1741)
- Theobald Bourke, 7th Viscount Mayo (died 1742)
- John Bourke, 8th Viscount Mayo (died 1767)
  - Hon. Aylmer Bourke (1743–1748)

== Viscounts Mayo: Second creation (1781) ==
- see Earl of Mayo

== See also ==
- House of Burgh, an Anglo-Norman and Hiberno-Norman dynasty founded in 1193
- Mac William Íochtar (Lower Mac William)
