= Chief of the Name =

Head of a family or clan

The Chief of the Name, or in older English usage Captain of his Nation, is the recognised head of a family or clan (Irish and Scottish Gaelic: fine) in Ireland and Scotland.

== Ireland ==
There are instances where Norman lords of the time like FitzGerald and Burke took to using the Gaelic style of "The" or "Mór" (great) to indicate that the individual was the primary person of his family in Ireland. Chiefs were elected from their clan's "Derbfine", a group of cousins who were all at least the great-grandsons of former chiefs, a system known as tanistry.

During the Tudor conquest of Ireland the Kingdom of Ireland was established by Henry VIII in 1542, and many of the former autonomous clan chiefs were assimilated under the English legal system via the policy of surrender and regrant. At the same time mentions were made in official records of locally-powerful landlords described as "chief of his nation", i.e. head of a family, whether assimilated or not. Attempts were made by the English to make each "chief" responsible for the good behaviour of the rest of his family and followers. The Gaelic practice was for such a man to sign himself by the family surname only. A new practice arose where the English version of the surname was in many instances prefixed by "The", and so for example the head of the Mac Aonghusa clan in County Down would sign as "Mac Aonghusa" in Irish, and as "The Magennis" in English.

After the 9 Years War Ireland saw a downfall of the Gaelic order which led to a decline of the power of the chiefs. Plantations of Ireland and the wars of Oliver Cromwell and King James meant that by the end of the century many of the Chiefships of the Name were living outside Ireland, reduced to poverty or lost forever.

Thereafter, those former kings or chiefs who had been assimilated under the English legal system passed their titles down by primogeniture, whereas the usual Irish practice in the Middle Ages was to elect a chief from a group of close cousins known as a derbfine. Some chiefs did not assimilate under the English legal system, but relied on the system of succession provided for under Irish Brehon Law. The lineages of assimilated chiefs were usually recorded by the Herald's Office in Dublin Castle, set up in 1552, not least because many clans in the 16th and 17th centuries had been persuaded to enter the English-law system under the policy of surrender and regrant. Other manuscript genealogies were preserved and published in the 18th century by Charles O'Conor and Sylvester O'Halloran. The Irish nationalist and republican movements that developed after 1850 often harked back emotively to the former chiefs' losses.

=== 1922–2003 ===
The Irish Free State, founded in 1922, gave no special recognition to the concept, but in 1938, the then Taoiseach, Éamon de Valera, at the inauguration of Dr. Douglas Hyde as the first President of Ireland, welcomed the incoming President with these words: "In you we greet the successor of our rightful princes and in your accession to office we hail the closing of the breach that has existed since the undoing of our nation at Kinsale". In 1948 the government suggested that there should be a "Council" of chiefs, accredited by the Herald, for emotive reasons. In Irish and English law a title is a possession, classed as an "incorporeal hereditament", but the 1937 Irish Constitution forbids the conferring of titles of nobility by the state, as well as the acceptance of titles of nobility or honour without the prior permission of the government. Therefore, the council was also a means of allowing them to use their titles, but only as honorifics and without any political function. In 1943 the Taoiseach (Irish Prime Minister) agreed with Edward MacLysaght, then Chief Herald of Ireland, that the titles would be known as "designations" made by the Herald's Office to avoid the constitutional ban. McLysaght deplored that anyone could perfectly legally describe themselves as "chief of the name" (such as The O'Rahilly) without having any written proof of descent, if nobody else claimed the very same title. In 1944–45, McLysaght recognised fifteen Chiefs of the Name whose lineages had been researched.

Effectively a dual system ran from 1948 to 2003, where the government recognised the chiefs as such, but not their other titles. In such a case, for example, The McDermot, Prince of Coolavin would only be known as "The McDermot" to the Chief Herald, but would be addressed also as "Prince of Coolavin" by his fellow chiefs.

Until 2003, an Irish "Chief of the Name" was a person recognised by the Chief Herald of Ireland as the most senior known male descendant of the last inaugurated or de facto chief of that name in power in Gaelic Ireland at or before the end of the 16th century. The practice was discontinued in 2003 owing to the "MacCarthy Mór" fraud (below).

=== Abandonment and MacCarthy Mór scandal ===
After genealogical errors in the 1990s saw Terence Francis MacCarthy and other impostors receive recognition, the Irish government decided in July 2003 to abandon this practice. This was partly because of concern that there was no proper legal basis for it. As this concern was backed by an opinion of the Attorney General, in 2003 the Genealogical Office discontinued the practice of recognising Chiefs. This decision was a cause for concern among the recognised chiefs.

Some modern Irish clan organisations have affiliated with Clans of Ireland, a limited company established in 1990 to provide "guidance in establishing and maintaining a successful Clan society".

=== Gaelic titles ===
In 1896, Jorge O'Neill of Portugal submitted his genealogy to the Somerset Herald in London. Five years later, Sir Henry Farnham Burke, KCVO, CB, FSA, Somerset Herald stated in 1900 that "the only Pedigree at present on record in either of the Offices of Arms showing a lineal male descent from the House of O'Neill, Monarchs of Ireland, Kings of Ulster, and Princes of Tyrone and Claneboy, is the one registered in the fifty-ninth year of the Reign of Our Sovereign Lady Victoria, in favor of His Excellency Jorge O'Neill of Lisbon". He then recognised him as the Representative of the House of O'Neill and as the Representative of the Earldom created in 1542 for his kinsman Conn Baccagh O'Neill. All of this was granted under Letters Patent issued by the English College of Heralds. Later, the Ulster and Norroy King of Arms granted him the undifferenced arms as the head of the House of O'Neill. Upon that Letters Patent, Pope Leo XIII, the King of Spain, and the King of Portugal recognised Jorge O'Neill as the Prince of Clanaboy, Tyrone, Ulster, as the Count of Tyrone, and the Head of the Royal House of O'Neill and all of its septs. The grandson of Jorge and present Prince of Clanaboy, Hugo, has not pressed his senior claim to the entire House of O'Neill out of respect for his O'Neill chief cousins and their own histories.

== Scotland ==
In general, the same pattern holds true of the clan chiefs in Scotland as for chiefs in Ireland. Titles may vary, but a chief of a clan is still the recognised leader within a Scottish clan. A difference is that in Scotland clan chiefs can be either male or female whereas in Ireland the clan chiefs are invariably male. In Scotland it is the Standing Council of Scottish Chiefs; in Ireland it is the Standing Council of Irish Chiefs and Chieftains (Irish: Buanchomhairle Thaoisigh Éireann). In Scotland there exists an 'Ad Hoc Derbhfine' approach to the selection of a new chiefly family when it has been determined that no verifiable descent from a former chief exists. Some have advocated that a similar approach be used in Ireland where chiefships have been lost to history.

== See also ==
- Donal II O'Donovan, a notable historical case
- White Rod
- Irish name
