= Marquess of Sligo =

Title in the Peerage of Ireland

Marquessate of Sligo
- Blazon Arms: Sable, three lions, passant, in bend, argent, between four bendlets, of the last. Crest: An eagle, displayed, vert. Supporters: Dexter, a talbot, gorged with a baron’s coronet, proper ; Sinister, a horse, argent.
- Creation date: 29 December 1800
- Created by: George III
- Peerage: Peerage of Ireland
- First holder: John Browne, 3rd Earl of Altamont
- Present holder: Sebastian Browne, 12th Marquess of Sligo
- Heir apparent: Christopher Browne, Earl of Altamont and Clanricarde
- Remainder to: Heirs male of the first Marquess's body lawfully begotten
- Subsidiary titles: Earl of Altamont; Earl of Clanricarde; Viscount Westport; Baron Mount Eagle; Baron Monteagle
- Status: Extant
- Former seat: Westport House
- Motto: SUIVEZ RAISON ("Follow the right")

Marquess of Sligo is a title in the Peerage of Ireland. It was created in 1800 for John Browne, 3rd Earl of Altamont. The Marquess holds the subsidiary titles of Baron Mount Eagle, of Westport in the County of Mayo (created 10 September 1760), Viscount Westport, of Westport in the County of Mayo (created 24 August 1768), Earl of Altamont, in the County of Mayo (created 4 December 1771), Earl of Clanricarde (created 1800) and Baron Monteagle, of Westport in the County of Mayo (created 20 February 1806). All these titles are in the Peerage of Ireland, except the Barony of Monteagle, which is in the Peerage of the United Kingdom. The latter peerage entitled the Marquesses to a seat in the House of Lords prior to the House of Lords Act 1999. The Earldom of Clanricarde was inherited by the sixth Marquess in 1916 according to a special remainder in the letters patent.

== History ==
The Browne family descends from Colonel John Browne, younger son of Sir John Browne, 1st Baronet, of The Neale, County Mayo, whose eldest son, the second Baronet, was the ancestor of the Barons Kilmaine. The baronetcy was created in 1636. Colonel John Browne's grandson John Browne represented Castlebar in the Irish House of Commons. He was created Baron Mount Eagle in 1760, Viscount Westport in 1768 and Earl of Altamont in 1771, the titles of Mount Eagle and Altamont deriving from Croagh Patrick near Westport. Both his son, the second Earl, and grandson, the third Earl, represented County Mayo in the Irish Parliament. In 1800 the latter was elected as one of the 28 original Irish representative peers and later that year he was created Marquess of Sligo.

In 1806, he was made Baron Monteagle in the Peerage of the United Kingdom, which gave the Marquesses an automatic seat in the House of Lords. He was succeeded by his son, the second Marquess. He was Lord Lieutenant of County Mayo from 1842 to 1845. Lord Sligo married Lady Hester Catherine de Burgh, eldest daughter of John Thomas de Burgh, 13th Earl of Clanricarde.

In 1800, Lord Clanricarde was given a new Earldom of Clanricarde, with remainder, failing heirs male of his own, to the heirs male of his two daughters. Lord Sligo's younger son, the fourth Marquess, represented County Mayo in Parliament from 1857 to 1868. His nephew, the sixth Marquess, succeeded to the Earldom of Clanricarde (1800 creation) in 1916 on the death of his cousin Hubert George de Burgh-Canning, 2nd Marquess of Clanricarde. As of 2014, the titles are held by his great-nephew, the twelfth Marquess, who succeeded his first cousin in 2014. He is a property consultant living in the central highlands of regional Victoria, Australia.

The family seat was Westport House, near Westport, County Mayo in Ireland. After the death of the 11th Marquess, it passed to his five daughters, in accordance with a private legislation passed by the Irish Senate in 1993. Westport House was sold by Lord Sligo's daughters in October 2017, breaking the formal link between Westport House and the family which had been ongoing for 380 years. The house was sold to the Hughes family, a local family of entrepreneurs with Portwest clothing manufacturing operations and a hotel in Westport.

== Earls of Altamont (1771) ==
Other titles: Baron Mount Eagle, of Westport, in the County of Mayo (Ireland, 1760); and Viscount Westport, of Westport, in the County of Mayo (Ireland, 1768)

- John Browne, 1st Earl of Altamont (c. 1709–1776)
- Peter Browne, 2nd Earl of Altamont (c. 1731–1780)
- John Denis Browne, 3rd Earl of Altamont (1756–1809) (created Marquess of Sligo In 1800)

== Marquesses of Sligo (1800) ==
Other titles: Baron Monteagle, of Westport in the County of Mayo (UK, 1806)

- John Denis Browne, 1st Marquess of Sligo (1756–1809)
- Howe Peter Browne, 2nd Marquess of Sligo (1788–1845)
- George John Browne, 3rd Marquess of Sligo (1820–1896)
- John Thomas Browne, 4th Marquess of Sligo (1824–1903)
- Henry Ulick Browne, 5th Marquess of Sligo (1831–1913)
- George Ulick Browne, 6th Marquess of Sligo (1856–1935)

Other titles (6th Marquess onwards): Earl of Clanricarde (Ireland, 1800)

- Ulick de Burgh Browne, 7th Marquess of Sligo (1898–1941)
- Arthur Howe Browne, 8th Marquess of Sligo (1867–1951)
- Terence Morris Browne, 9th Marquess of Sligo (1873–1952)
- Denis Edward Browne, 10th Marquess of Sligo (1908–1991)
- Jeremy Ulick Browne, 11th Marquess of Sligo (1939–2014)
- Sebastian Ulick Browne, 12th Marquess of Sligo (b. 1964)

== Present peer ==
Sebastian Ulick Browne, 12th Marquess of Sligo (born 27 May 1964), is the son of Lord Ulick Browne and his wife, Fiona Glenn, and a first cousin of the 11th Marquess. He was educated at Rugby School.

On 13 July 2014, Browne succeeded as Marquess of Sligo (I., 1800), Earl of Altamont (I., 1771), Earl of Clanricarde (I., 1800), Viscount Westport, of Westport (I., 1768), Baron Mount Eagle of Westport (I., 1760), and Baron Monteagle of Westport (U.K., 1806).

Lord Sligo did not inherit Westport House and the Altamont estate in Ireland, as his predecessor, the 11th Marquess, had successfully petitioned to have an Act of the Oireachtas (an Irish Act of Parliament) passed which enabled him to break the family trust and leave the estate to his five daughters. They were forced to sell the property in 2017.

In 1984, the current Lord Sligo married firstly Christina Maria Suaznabar, daughter of Luis Suaznabar; they were divorced in 1992, after having two children:

- Lady Camilla Browne (born 1986)
- Christopher Ulick Browne, Earl of Altamont and Clanricarde (born 1988), heir apparent

On 22 January 2016, at Wollongong, New South Wales, he married secondly Claire Suzanne van Middelkoop.

== Genealogy ==
=== Family tree ===
Clanricarde and Sligo family tree

Clanricarde or Mac William Uachtar
Ulick Burke of Annaghkeen d. 1343 or 1353; 1st Clanricarde
Richard Óg Burke d. 1387; 2nd Clanricarde
Ulick an Fhiona Burke d. 1424; 3rd Clanricarde | William mac Ulick Burke d. 1430; 4th Clanricarde
Ulick Ruadh Burke d. 1485; 5th Clanricarde
Edmund Burke d. 1466 | Ulick Fionn Burke d. 1509; 6th Clanricarde | Richard Óge Burke d. 1519; 7th Clanricarde
Ricard of Roscam d. 1517 | Ulick Óge Burke d. 1520; 8th Clanricarde | Richard Mór Burke d. 1530; 9th Clanricarde | Richard Bacach Burke d. 1538; 11th Clanricarde | Uilleag Burke d. 1551; 13th Clanricarde
Earl of Clanricarde (1st creation) and Baron of Dunkellin, 1543
John mac Richard Mór Burke d. 1536; 10th Clanricarde | Ulick na gCeann Burke d. 1544; 1st Earl of Clanricarde, etc., 12th Clanricarde
Richard Burke d. 1582; 2nd Earl of Clanricarde, etc.
Ulick Burke d. 1601; 3rd Earl of Clanricarde, etc.
Viscount Tunbridge and Baron of Somerhill, 1624; Earl of St Albans (1st creation), Viscount Galway and Baron of Imanney, 1628 | Viscount Bourke of Clanmories, 1629
Richard Burke; 1572–1635; 4th Earl of Clanricarde, etc., 1st Earl of St Albans, etc. | William Burke d. 1625 | John Burke b. before 1601–1633; 1st Viscount Bourke of Clanmories
Marquess of Clanricarde (1st creation), 1646
John Browne d. 1712 | Ulick Burke d. 1657; Marquess of Clanricarde, 5th Earl of Clanricarde, etc., 2nd Earl of St Albans, etc., 3rd Viscount Bourke of Clanmories | Richard Burke d. 1666; 6th Earl of Clanricarde, etc., 4th Viscount Bourke of Clanmories | William Burke d. 1687; 7th Earl of Clanricarde, etc., 5th Viscount Bourke of Clanmories | Thomas Burke d. c. 1650; 2nd Viscount Bourke of Clanmories
Marquessate of Clanricarde (1st creation), Earldom of St Albans (1st creation), Viscountcy Tunbridge, Barony of Somerhill extinct, 1657
Baron Bourke of Boffin, 1689 | Viscount Galway (2nd creation) and Baron Tyaquin, 1687
Peter Browne; 1670–1724 | Richard Burke d. 1709; 8th Earl of Clanricarde, etc., 6th Viscount Bourke of Clanmories | John Burke; 1642–1722; 9th Earl of Clanricarde, etc., 7th Viscount Bourke of Clanmories, 1st Baron Bourke of Boffin | Ulick Burke c. 1670–1691; Viscount Galway, etc.
Viscountcy Galway and Barony Tyaquin extinct, 1657
Baron Mount Eagle, 1760; Viscount Westport, 1768; Earl of Altamont, 1771
John Browne c. 1709–1776; 1st Earl of Altamont, etc. | Michael Burke; 1686–1726; 10th Earl of Clanricarde, etc., 8th Viscount Bourke of Clanmories, 2nd Baron Bourke of Boffin
Peter Browne c. 1731–1780; 2nd Earl of Altamont, etc. | John Smith de Burgh; 1720–1782; 11th Earl of Clanricarde, etc., 9th Viscount Bourke of Clanmories, 3rd Baron Bourke of Boffin
Marquess of Sligo, 1800; Baron Monteagle, 1806 | Marquess of Clanricarde (2nd creation), 1789 | Earl of Clanricarde (2nd creation), 1800
John Browne; 1756–1809; 1st Marquess of Sligo, etc., 3rd Earl of Altamont, etc. | Henry de Burgh; 1742–1797; Marquess of Clanricarde, 12th Earl of Clanricarde, etc., 10th Viscount Bourke of Clanmories, 4th Baron Bourke of Boffin | John Thomas de Burgh; 1744–1808; 13th Earl of Clanricarde (1st creation), etc. 1st Earl of Clanricarde (2nd creation), 11th Viscount Bourke of Clanmories, 5th Baron Bourke of Boffin
Marquessate of Clanricarde (2nd creation) extinct, 1797
Marquess of Clanricarde (3rd creation), 1825; Baron Somerhill, 1826
Howe Browne; 1788–1845; 2nd Marquess of Sligo, etc., 4th Earl of Altamont, etc. | Hester Catherine de Burgh | Ulick John de Burgh; 1802–1874; 1st Marquess of Clanricarde, etc., 14th Earl of Clanricarde (1st creation), etc. 2nd Earl of Clanricarde (2nd creation), 12th Viscount Bourke of Clanmories, 6th Baron Bourke of Boffin
George John Browne; 1820–1896; 3rd Marquess of Sligo, etc., 5th Earl of Altamont, etc. | John Thomas Browne; 1824–1903; 4th Marquess of Sligo, etc., 6th Earl of Altamont, etc. | Henry Ulick Browne; 1831–1913; 5th Marquess of Sligo, etc., 7th Earl of Altamont, etc. | Hubert George de Burgh-Canning, 2nd Marquess of Clanricarde; 1832–1916; 2nd Marquess of Clanricarde, etc., 15th Earl of Clanricarde (1st creation), etc. 3rd Earl of Clanricarde (2nd creation), 13th Viscount Bourke of Clanmories, 7th Baron Bourke of Boffin
Marquessate of Clanricarde (3rd creation) and Earldom of Clanricarde (1st creation) extinct, 1916
George Ulick Browne; 1856–1835; 6th Marquess of Sligo, etc., 8th Earl of Altamont, etc., 4th Earl of Clanricarde | Arthur Howe Browne; 1867–1851; 8th Marquess of Sligo, etc., 10th Earl of Altamont, etc., 6th Earl of Clanricarde | Terence Morris Browne; 1873–1852; 9th Marquess of Sligo, etc., 11th Earl of Altamont, etc., 7th Earl of Clanricarde | Alfred Eden Browne
Ulick de Burgh Browne; 1898–1941; 7th Marquess of Sligo, etc., 9th Earl of Altamont, etc., 5th Earl of Clanricarde | Denis Edward Browne; 1908–1991; 10th Marquess of Sligo, etc., 12th Earl of Altamont, etc., 8th Earl of Clanricarde | Ulick Browne; 1915–1979
Jeremy Ulick Browne; 1939–2014; 11th Marquess of Sligo, etc., 13th Earl of Altamont, etc., 9th Earl of Clanricarde | Sebastian Ulick Browne b. 1964; 12th Marquess of Sligo, etc., 14th Earl of Altamont, etc., 10th Earl of Clanricarde
Christopher Ulick Browne b. 1988 styled Earl of Altamont and Clanricarde
Heir apparent to the Marquessate of Sligo

=== Line of succession ===
Line of succession
- Howe Browne, 2nd Marquess of Sligo (1788–1845)
  - George Browne, 3rd Marquess of Sligo (1820–1896)
  - John Browne, 4th Marquess of Sligo (1824–1903)
  - Henry Browne, 5th Marquess of Sligo (1831–1913)
    - George Browne, 6th Marquess of Sligo (1856–1935)
      - Ulick de Burgh Browne, 7th Marquess of Sligo (1898–1941)
    - Arthur Browne, 8th Marquess of Sligo (1867–1951)
    - Terence Browne, 9th Marquess of Sligo (1873–1952)
    - Lord Alfred Eden Browne (1878–1918)
      - Denis Browne, 10th Marquess of Sligo (1908–1991)
        - Jeremy Browne, 11th Marquess of Sligo (1939–2014)
      - Lord Ulick Browne (1915–1979)
        - Sebastian Browne, 12th Marquess of Sligo (born 1964)
          - (1). Christopher Ulick Browne, Earl of Altamont and Clanricarde (b. 1988)
  - Lord Richard Howe Brown (1834–1912)
    - Percy Howe Browne (1868–1940)
      - Anthony Howe Browne (1905–1940)
        - (2). Patrick Ulick Anthony Howe Browne (b. 1935)
          - (3). Patrick Alexander Howe Browne (b. 1965)
          - (4). Anthony Howe Browne (b. 1967)
            - (5). Theo Howe Higgins Browne
        - (6). Michael John le Roy Browne (b. 1936)
          - (7). Richard Howe Browne (b. 1962)
          - (8). Jeremy Ulick Browne (b. 1963)

There are further male heirs in line to the earldom of Altamont and its subsidiary titles, who are descended from the younger son of the 2nd earl.

== See also ==
- House of Burgh
