= Viscount Galway =

Title created four times in the Peerage of Ireland

Viscount Galway Víosa na Gaillimhe
- Arms: Quarterly, 1st and 4th, Sable, six Swallows, three, two and one, Argent (Arundell); 2nd and 3rd, Sable, on a Chevron, between three Martlets Or, as many Mullets of the field (Monckton). Crests: 1st, On a Chapeau Gules, turned up Ermine, a Swallow Argent (Arundell); 2nd, A Martlet Or (Monckton). Supporters: On either side a Unicorn Ermine crined, armed and unguled Or, each gorged with an Eastern Diadem Or.
- Creation date: 17 July 1727
- Creation: fourth
- Created by: George I
- Peerage: Ireland
- First holder: John Monckton
- Present holder: Philip Monckton-Arundell, 13th Viscount Galway
- Heir presumptive: Piers Alastair Carlos Monckton
- Remainder to: the 1st Viscount's heirs male of the body lawfully begotten
- Subsidiary titles: Baron Killard; Baron Monckton (extinct 1971)
- Status: Extant
- Seat: Stretton Hall
- Former seat: Serlby Hall
- Motto: FAMAM EXTENDERE FACTIS (Extending my fame by deeds)

Viscount Galway (Irish: Víosa na Gaillimhe) is a title that has been created four times in the Peerage of Ireland. The first creation came in 1628 in favour of Richard Burke, 4th Earl of Clanricarde. He was made Earl of St Albans in the Peerage of England at the same time (see the Earl of Clanricarde for more information on this creation).

The second creation came in the Peerage of Ireland in 1687 in favour of Ulick Bourke. He was made Baron Tyaquin at the same time, also in the Peerage of Ireland, deriving from the barony of Tiaquin in County Galway. However, both titles became extinct on his early death in 1691.

The third creation came in the Peerage of Ireland in 1692 in favour of the French soldier and diplomat Henry de Massue, Marquis de Ruvigny, who was created Baron Portarlington, also in the Peerage of Ireland, at the same time. He was made Earl of Galway in 1697. However, all three titles became extinct on his death in 1720.

The fourth creation came in the Peerage of Ireland in 1727 when John Monckton was made Baron Killard, of the County of Clare, and Viscount Galway. He represented Clitheroe and Pontefract in the British House of Commons and served as Surveyor General of Woods and Forests in England and Wales. His son, the second Viscount, sat as a Member of Parliament for Pontefract and Thirsk. In 1769 he assumed by royal licence the additional surname of Arundell. His son, the third Viscount, briefly represented Pontefract in Parliament. He was succeeded by his younger brother, the fourth Baron, who also sat for Pontefract as well as for Yorkshire. His son, the fifth Viscount, discontinued the use of the surname of Arundell by royal licence in 1826 and instead obtained permission for each successive holder of the title and his eldest son to use the surnames Monckton-Arundell while the younger branches of the family should use Monckton only.

His son, the sixth Viscount, sat for many years as the Conservative Member of Parliament for East Retford. His son, the seventh Viscount, represented Nottinghamshire North in the House of Commons as a Conservative and was also an Aide-de-Camp to Queen Victoria, King Edward VII and King George V. In 1887 he was created Baron Monckton, of Serlby in the County of Nottingham, in the Peerage of the United Kingdom, which gave him and his descendants an automatic seat in the House of Lords. His son, the eighth Viscount, was Governor-General of New Zealand from 1935 to 1941.

He was succeeded by his son, the ninth Viscount. On his early death in 1971, he had no direct male heir. His landownings passed to his daughter Charlotte (the Hon. Mrs Charlotte Townsend of Melbury House). The Monckton barony became extinct while he was succeeded in the Irish titles by his second cousin once removed, the tenth Viscount. He was the grandson of the Hon. Edmund Gambier Monckton, fourth son of the fifth Viscount, and as he was a member of a younger branch of the family he was named only Monckton, in accordance with the rules obtained by the fifth Viscount. However, he adopted by royal licence the surname Arundell on his succession for himself and for all successive holders of the title. On the death in 1980 of his younger brother, the eleventh Viscount, this line of the family also failed. He was succeeded by his second cousin once removed, the twelfth Viscount, who was born in Canada. In 2017 he was succeeded by his only son, the thirteenth Viscount who is the great-grandson of Marmaduke John Monckton, third son of the Hon. Edmund Gambier Monckton, fourth son of the fifth Viscount. Lord Galway lives in Canada and represented Canada as a rower in the 1984 Summer Olympics.

Papers of the Viscounts Galway are held at Manuscripts and Special Collections, The University of Nottingham.

The family seat was Serlby Hall, in Bassetlaw, Nottinghamshire.

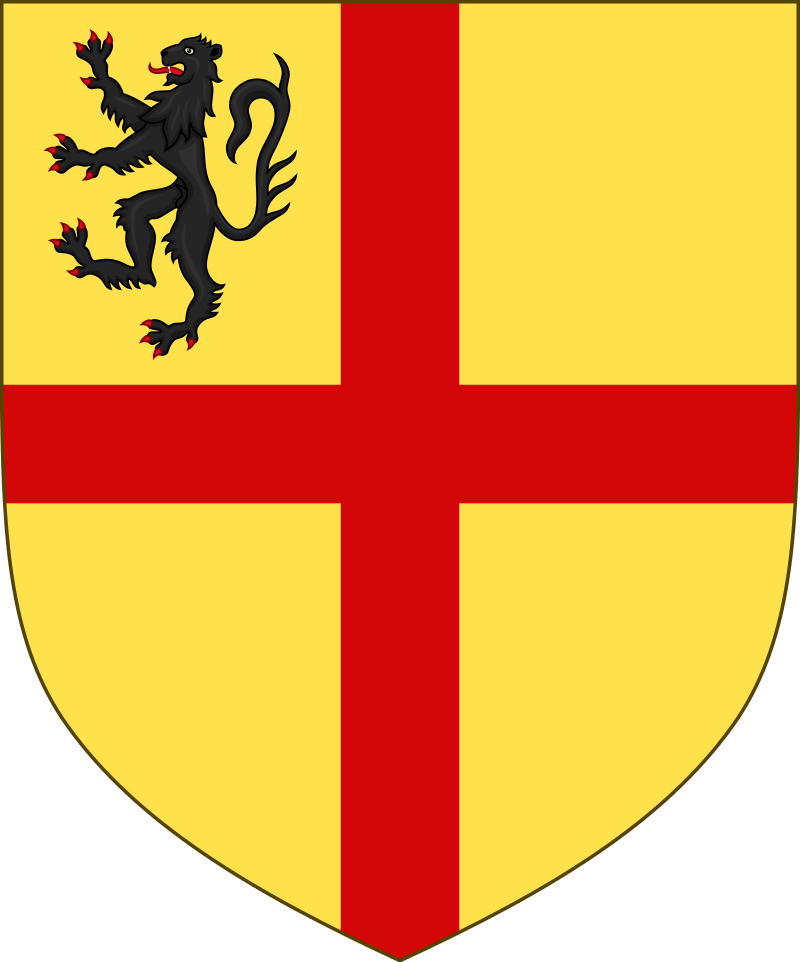
Arms of de Burghs/Burkes of Clanricarde

== Viscounts Galway, first creation (1628) ==
See the Earl of Clanricarde

== Viscounts Galway, second creation (1687) ==
Other titles: Baron Tyaquin (Ireland, 1687)

- Ulick Bourke, 1st Viscount Galway (1670–1691)

Clanricarde and Sligo family tree

Clanricarde or Mac William Uachtar
Ulick Burke of Annaghkeen d. 1343 or 1353; 1st Clanricarde
Richard Óg Burke d. 1387; 2nd Clanricarde
Ulick an Fhiona Burke d. 1424; 3rd Clanricarde	William mac Ulick Burke d. 1430; 4th Clanricarde
Ulick Ruadh Burke d. 1485; 5th Clanricarde
Edmund Burke d. 1466	Ulick Fionn Burke d. 1509; 6th Clanricarde	Richard Óge Burke d. 1519; 7th Clanricarde
Ricard of Roscam d. 1517	Ulick Óge Burke d. 1520; 8th Clanricarde	Richard Mór Burke d. 1530; 9th Clanricarde	Richard Bacach Burke d. 1538; 11th Clanricarde	Uilleag Burke d. 1551; 13th Clanricarde
Earl of Clanricarde (1st creation) and Baron of Dunkellin, 1543
John mac Richard Mór Burke d. 1536; 10th Clanricarde	Ulick na gCeann Burke d. 1544; 1st Earl of Clanricarde, etc., 12th Clanricarde
Richard Burke d. 1582; 2nd Earl of Clanricarde, etc.
Ulick Burke d. 1601; 3rd Earl of Clanricarde, etc.
Viscount Tunbridge and Baron of Somerhill, 1624; Earl of St Albans (1st creation), Viscount Galway and Baron of Imanney, 1628	Viscount Bourke of Clanmories, 1629
Richard Burke; 1572–1635; 4th Earl of Clanricarde, etc., 1st Earl of St Albans, etc.	William Burke d. 1625	John Burke b. before 1601–1633; 1st Viscount Bourke of Clanmories
Marquess of Clanricarde (1st creation), 1646
John Browne d. 1712	Ulick Burke d. 1657; Marquess of Clanricarde, 5th Earl of Clanricarde, etc., 2nd Earl of St Albans, etc., 3rd Viscount Bourke of Clanmories	Richard Burke d. 1666; 6th Earl of Clanricarde, etc., 4th Viscount Bourke of Clanmories	William Burke d. 1687; 7th Earl of Clanricarde, etc., 5th Viscount Bourke of Clanmories	Thomas Burke d. c. 1650; 2nd Viscount Bourke of Clanmories
Marquessate of Clanricarde (1st creation), Earldom of St Albans (1st creation), Viscountcy Tunbridge, Barony of Somerhill extinct, 1657
Baron Bourke of Boffin, 1689	Viscount Galway (2nd creation) and Baron Tyaquin, 1687
Peter Browne; 1670–1724	Richard Burke d. 1709; 8th Earl of Clanricarde, etc., 6th Viscount Bourke of Clanmories	John Burke; 1642–1722; 9th Earl of Clanricarde, etc., 7th Viscount Bourke of Clanmories, 1st Baron Bourke of Boffin	Ulick Burke c. 1670–1691; Viscount Galway, etc.
Viscountcy Galway and Barony Tyaquin extinct, 1657
Baron Mount Eagle, 1760; Viscount Westport, 1768; Earl of Altamont, 1771
John Browne c. 1709–1776; 1st Earl of Altamont, etc.	Michael Burke; 1686–1726; 10th Earl of Clanricarde, etc., 8th Viscount Bourke of Clanmories, 2nd Baron Bourke of Boffin
Peter Browne c. 1731–1780; 2nd Earl of Altamont, etc.	John Smith de Burgh; 1720–1782; 11th Earl of Clanricarde, etc., 9th Viscount Bourke of Clanmories, 3rd Baron Bourke of Boffin
Marquess of Sligo, 1800; Baron Monteagle, 1806	Marquess of Clanricarde (2nd creation), 1789	Earl of Clanricarde (2nd creation), 1800
John Browne; 1756–1809; 1st Marquess of Sligo, etc., 3rd Earl of Altamont, etc.	Henry de Burgh; 1742–1797; Marquess of Clanricarde, 12th Earl of Clanricarde, etc., 10th Viscount Bourke of Clanmories, 4th Baron Bourke of Boffin	John Thomas de Burgh; 1744–1808; 13th Earl of Clanricarde (1st creation), etc. 1st Earl of Clanricarde (2nd creation), 11th Viscount Bourke of Clanmories, 5th Baron Bourke of Boffin
Marquessate of Clanricarde (2nd creation) extinct, 1797
Marquess of Clanricarde (3rd creation), 1825; Baron Somerhill, 1826
Howe Browne; 1788–1845; 2nd Marquess of Sligo, etc., 4th Earl of Altamont, etc.	Hester Catherine de Burgh	Ulick John de Burgh; 1802–1874; 1st Marquess of Clanricarde, etc., 14th Earl of Clanricarde (1st creation), etc. 2nd Earl of Clanricarde (2nd creation), 12th Viscount Bourke of Clanmories, 6th Baron Bourke of Boffin
George John Browne; 1820–1896; 3rd Marquess of Sligo, etc., 5th Earl of Altamont, etc.	John Thomas Browne; 1824–1903; 4th Marquess of Sligo, etc., 6th Earl of Altamont, etc.	Henry Ulick Browne; 1831–1913; 5th Marquess of Sligo, etc., 7th Earl of Altamont, etc.	Hubert George de Burgh-Canning, 2nd Marquess of Clanricarde; 1832–1916; 2nd Marquess of Clanricarde, etc., 15th Earl of Clanricarde (1st creation), etc. 3rd Earl of Clanricarde (2nd creation), 13th Viscount Bourke of Clanmories, 7th Baron Bourke of Boffin
Marquessate of Clanricarde (3rd creation) and Earldom of Clanricarde (1st creation) extinct, 1916
George Ulick Browne; 1856–1835; 6th Marquess of Sligo, etc., 8th Earl of Altamont, etc., 4th Earl of Clanricarde	Arthur Howe Browne; 1867–1851; 8th Marquess of Sligo, etc., 10th Earl of Altamont, etc., 6th Earl of Clanricarde	Terence Morris Browne; 1873–1852; 9th Marquess of Sligo, etc., 11th Earl of Altamont, etc., 7th Earl of Clanricarde	Alfred Eden Browne
Ulick de Burgh Browne; 1898–1941; 7th Marquess of Sligo, etc., 9th Earl of Altamont, etc., 5th Earl of Clanricarde	Denis Edward Browne; 1908–1991; 10th Marquess of Sligo, etc., 12th Earl of Altamont, etc., 8th Earl of Clanricarde	Ulick Browne; 1915–1979
Jeremy Ulick Browne; 1939–2014; 11th Marquess of Sligo, etc., 13th Earl of Altamont, etc., 9th Earl of Clanricarde	Sebastian Ulick Browne b. 1964; 12th Marquess of Sligo, etc., 14th Earl of Altamont, etc., 10th Earl of Clanricarde
Christopher Ulick Browne b. 1988 styled Earl of Altamont and Clanricarde
Heir apparent to the Marquessate of Sligo

== Viscounts Galway, third creation (1692), and Earl of Galway (1697) ==
- Henri de Massue, Marquis de Ruvigny, 1st Viscount Galway (1648–1720)

== Viscounts Galway, fourth creation (1727) ==
Other titles: Baron Killard, of the County of Clare (Ireland, 1727)

- John Monckton, 1st Viscount Galway (1695–1751)
- William Monckton-Arundell, 2nd Viscount Galway (d.1772)
- Henry William Monckton-Arundell, 3rd Viscount Galway (1749–1774)
- Robert Monckton-Arundell, 4th Viscount Galway (1752–1810)
- William George Monckton-Arundell, 5th Viscount Galway (1782–1834)
- George Edward Arundell Monckton-Arundell, 6th Viscount Galway (1805–1876)

Other titles (6th Viscount onwards): Baron Monckton, of Serlby in the County of Nottingham (UK, 1887)

- George Edmund Milnes Monckton-Arundell, 7th Viscount Galway (1844–1931)
- George Vere Arundel Monckton-Arundell, 8th Viscount Galway (1882–1943)
- Simon George Robert Monckton-Arundell, 9th Viscount Galway (1929–1971)
- William Arundell Monckton-Arundell, 10th Viscount Galway (1894–1977)
- Edmund Savile Monckton-Arundell, 11th Viscount Galway (1900–1980)
- George Rupert Monckton-Arundell, 12th Viscount Galway (1922–2017)
- John Philip Monckton-Arundell, 13th Viscount Galway (born 1952)

The heir presumptive is Piers Alastair Carlos Monckton (born 1962), a great-great-great-great grandson of the 1st Viscount.
His heir is his son Oliver George Carlos Monckton (born 1993).
