= Ulick Burke =

Ulick Burke, Bourk or Burgh is the name of:

- Ulick Burke of Umhaill (died 1343), founder of the Bourkes of the Owles
- Uilleag de Burgh or Sir Ulick Burke, 1st Clanricarde or Mac William Uachtar (d.1343 or 1353), Irish chieftain and noble
- Ulick an Fhiona Burke, 3rd Clanricarde or Mac William Uachtar (d. 1424), Irish chieftain and noble
- Ulick Ruadh Burke, 5th Clanricarde or Mac William Uachtar (d. 1485), Irish chieftain and noble
- Ulick Fionn Burke, 6th Clanricarde or Mac William Uachtar (d. 1509), Irish chieftain and noble
- Ulick Óge Burke, 8th Clanricarde or Mac William Uachtar (d. 1520), Irish chieftain and noble
- Ulick na gCeann Burke, 1st Earl of Clanricarde and 12th Clanricarde or Mac William Uachtar (d. 1544), Irish noble
- Ulick Burke, 3rd Earl of Clanricarde, 3rd Earl of Clanricarde (d. 1601), Irish peer
- Ulick Burke, 1st Marquess of Clanricarde or Ulick MacRichard Burke (1604–1657), Anglo-Irish nobleman
- Ulick Burke, 1st Viscount Galway (c. 1670–1691), Irish peer and army officer
- Sir Ulick Burke, 3rd Baronet (died 1708), of Glinsk, MP for Galway County
- Ulick Canning de Burgh, Lord Dunkellin (1827–1867), Anglo-Irish soldier and politician
- Ulick de Burgh, 1st Marquess of Clanricarde (1802–1874), British whig politician
- Ulick Ralph Burke (1845–1895), scholar
- Ulick Burke (politician), Irish Fine Gael politician
- Peter Burke (historian), or Ulick Peter Burke, British historian
- Sir Ulick Burke, 1st Baronet (c. 1594–c. 1660) of the Burke Baronets
- Sir Ulick Burke, 8th Baronet (d. 1759) of the Burke Baronets

== See also ==
- de Burgh
- Burke (surname)
