= Ulick =

- Pronunciation: /ˈjuːlɪk/ YOO-lik
- Gender: Flemish
- Language: English

Origin
- Language: Irish
- Origin: Uilleac, Uilleag

Ulick is a masculine given name in the English language. It is an Anglicised form of the Irish Uilleac and Uilleag. These Irish names are of an uncertain origin, although they are thought most probably to be derived from the Old Norse Hugleikr. This Old Norse name is composed of two elements: the first, hugr, means 'mind, prudence, thought, spirit'; the second element, leikr, means "play", "sport". The other possibility is that the Irish names are diminutive forms of Uilliam, the Irish form of the English William.

== List of people with the name ==
- Sir Ulick Alexander (1889–1973), British Army officer, businessman, and courtier
- Ulick Bourke (1829–1887), Irish scholar and writer who founded the Gaelic Union, which developed into the Gaelic League
- Ulick an Fhiona Burke, Irish chieftain, noble and 3rd Clanricarde or Mac William Uachtar (died 1424)
- Ulick Fionn Burke, Irish chieftain and noble (died 1509)
- Ulick Óge Burke, Irish chieftain and noble (died 1520)
- Ulick Ruadh Burke, Irish chieftain and noble (died 1485)
- Ulick Burke, 1st Marquess of Clanricarde (born 1604), Irish nobleman and figure in English Civil War
- Ulick Burke, 3rd Earl of Clanricarde (died 1601), Irish peer
- Ulick Burke, 1st Viscount Galway (1670–1691), Irish Jacobite and noble (died 1691)
- Sir Ulick Burke, 3rd Baronet (died 1708), Irish County Galway landowner and politician
- Ulick Burke (politician) (born 1943), Irish Fine Gael politician
- (Ulick) Peter Burke (born 1937), British historian
- Ulick Burke of Annaghkeen (died 1353), Irish nobleman, the third son of William Liath Burke
- Ulick Burke of Umhaill (died 1343), the son of Richard an Forbair de Burke, and grandson of William Liath Burke
- Ulick Considine (1901–1950), British cricketer who played as an amateur for Somerset
- Ulick de Burgh, 1st Marquess of Clanricarde (1802–1874), British Whig politician
- Ulick de Burgh, Lord Dunkellin (1827–1867), Anglo-Irish soldier and politician
- Ulick de Burgh Browne, 7th Marquess of Sligo (1898–1941), British and Irish peer and British army officer
- Ulick Richardson Evans (1889–1980), British metallurgist
- Ulick Lupede (born 1984), French footballer
- Ulick McEvaddy (born 1952), Irish aviation executive
- Ulick na gCeann Burke, 1st Earl of Clanricarde (died 1544), 12th Clanricarde and 1st Earl of Clanricarde
- Ulick Nally (fl. 1680–1697), Parish priest
- Ulick O'Connor (1928–2019), Irish writer, historian and critic
- Ulick Varange (1917–1960), pen name of the American far-right political philosopher Francis Parker Yockey
