= Richard Burke =

Richard or Dick Burke may refer to:

- Richard Burke Jr. (1758–1794), member of parliament, son of Edmund Burke
- Richard Burke (Irish politician) (1932–2016), Irish Fine Gael politician and European Commissioner
- Richard Anthony Burke (born 1949), Irish bishop in the Roman Catholic Church
- Richard J. Burke (1915–1999), Irish-American journalist, poet and playwright
- Richard T. Burke, founder of UnitedHealth Group and creator of the HMO
- Richard Burke, 2nd Earl of Clanricarde or Richard (Sassanach) Burke (died 1582), Irish noble
- Richard Burke, 4th Earl of Clanricarde or Richard de Burgh (1572–1635), Irish nobleman and politician
- Richard Burke, 6th Earl of Clanricarde (died 1666), Irish peer
- Richard Burke, 8th Earl of Clanricarde (died 1709), Irish peer
- Richard Óg Burke, 2nd Clanricarde or Mac William Uachtar (died 1387), Irish chieftain and noble
- Richard Óge Burke, 7th Clanricarde or Mac William Uachtar (died 1519), Irish chieftain and noble
- Richard Mór Burke, 9th Clanricarde or Mac William Uachtar (died 1530), Irish chieftain and noble
- Richard Bacach Burke, 11th Clanricarde or Mac William Uachtar (died 1538), Irish chieftain and noble
- Dick Burke (footballer, born 1920) (1920–2004), English football player
- Dick Burke (Australian footballer) (born 1938), Australian rules footballer for South Melbourne
- Richard Burke (Friends), a character on the television sitcom Friends
- Rick Burke, a character on the television series 24
- Richard Burke (businessman) (1934–2008), co-founder of Trek Bicycle Corporation
- Richard Burke (Alabama politician) (1807/08–1870), Baptist preacher and Alabama state representative
- Richard John Charles Burke (1878–1960), British military officer and member of the Indian Political Service
- Ricky Burke (born 1990), Scottish footballer

== See also ==
- Ricard O'Sullivan Burke (1838–1922), Irish nationalist and American soldier, campaigner, and engineer
