= Maire Lynch =

Máire Lynch, Countess of Clanricarde (fl. 1547) was an Irish noblewoman.

Lynch was a member of the Tribes of Galway who married, prior to his death in 1544, Ulick na gCeann Burke, 1st Earl of Clanricarde. The reason for the marriage was to aid Burke's assimilation into Old English society and learn English.

However, Lynch was only one of three wives that Burke was simultaneously married to (see Early Irish Law). Upon his death, she claimed that their son, John Burke, should become 2nd Earl. A commission established that the legitimate heir was Richard Burke, 2nd Earl of Clanricarde, son of Burke's first marriage to Gráinne Ní Chearbaill of Ely O'Carroll. Lynch was in compensation granted £300.00.

Her son, John, would nevertheless challenge his half-brother for the earldom in the 1550s. In 1553, the Annals of the Four Masters state that John Burke was besieged at his castle of Binmore (Beann-mor) by Earl Richard, but the latter had been driven off by Donnell O'Brien. The same annals record, sub anno 1598, that the two sons of William, son of John Burke of Rinn-Mhil (near Oranmore) were killed during an invasion of Galway by Aodh Ruadh Ó Domnaill.

By 1547, Máire Lynch had remarried to Piers Martin of Galway (fl. 1547–60). Adrian Martyn (2005) believed the couple to be grandparents of Walter Martyn, Mayor of Galway for the term 1613–14. He accounts among her descendants Patrick Martyn fitz Walter (Mayor 1622–23), George Martyn fitz Walter (Mayor 1631–32), as well as other sheriffs and merchants of the town. He further states that his research indicates that Máire and Piers are ancestors to a large section of the Martyn family of Galway, whom he terms the Clan Walter. He places the clan in south-west Galway, in an area from Loughrea to Kilcolgan and bounded by Gort in the south.

The year of Lynch's death is unknown. She would have been buried in the town of Galway.

== See also ==
- Burke (name)
- Lynch (surname)
- Peirce Lynch
- The Tribes of Galway
- Earl of Clanricarde
