= Richard Óg de Burgh =

Fictional Irish Noble

Richard Óg de Burgh (English: /dəˈbɜːr/ də-BUR; fl. early-to-mid 13th century) was an Anglo-Irish noble and soldier who was the ancestor of de Burgh/Burkes of Clanricarde.

== Background ==
Richard Óg de Burgh is alleged in some post-medieval sources to have been a younger, illegitimate son, of William de Burgh (the elder), Governor of Limerick, Seneschal of Munster (died 1206). However, recent scholarship has shed light on the true early ancestry of the de Burgh (Burke) family, most notedly that Richard Óg de Burgh, illegitimate son of William de Burgh (d. 1206), never existed and was a complete genealogical invention. Both Oxford Dictionary of National Biography articles published in the 21st century on William de Burgh (died 1206) and his son Richard de Burgh (died 1243) confirm that the elder William (died 1206) had only one son named Richard de Burgh (died 1243). As such, it is widely accepted amongst eminent genealogical historians that William de Burgh (died 1206) had just three sons (Richard Mór de Burgh, 1st Lord of Connacht; Hubert de Burgh, Bishop of Limerick; and William de Burgh, Sheriff of Connacht) with only one being named Richard de Burgh. Therefore, it is Richard Mór de Burgh's (died 1243) youngest son, William Óg de Burgh (died 1270), who is the ancestor of the Clanricarde. Due to this confusion the real Richard de Burgh is often referred to as "Richard Mór Óg de Burgh", combining the two names.

The family tree below represents the best scholarship on the different branches and lines of descent of the early de Burgh (Burke) family.

== Eponym of Clanricarde ==
Richard Mór de Burgh, 1st Lord of Connacht (died 1243) is considered the ancestor of the Burke family of Clanricarde in south Connacht (now County Galway, which became an extremely powerful family in their own right following the Burke Civil War of the 1330s.

According to volume nine of A New History of Ireland, "The origins of the Clanricard line are not absolutely proven, but the descent given" (on page 170, see family tree below) "is that in the best Irish genealogical sources and is not contradicted by contemporary sources."

== Genealogy ==
  Walter de Burgh of Burgh Castle, Norfolk.
 =Alice
  |
  |_____________________________________________________________________________________________________________________
  |                                    |                                                |                              |
  |                                    |                                                |                              |
 William de Burgh, died 1206.    Hubert de Burgh, 1st Earl of Kent, d. 1243.  Geoffrey de Burgh, d. 1228.  Thomas de Burgh
  |                                        (issue; John and Hubert)                          
  |____________________________________________________________________________________________________________________________________________________________
  |                                                         |                                             |                                                    |
  |                                                         |                                             |                                                    |    
 Richard Mór de Burgh, 1st Baron of Connaught  Hubert de Burgh, Bishop of Limerick, d. 1250.    William de Burgh, Sheriff of Connacht    Richard Óge de Burgh (*Did not exist*)
  |                                      |                                                                      
  |                                      |         
 de Burgh Earl of Ulster,            William Óg de Burgh, d. 1270                
 Burke of Castleconnell, County Limerick      |                
 Mac William Iochtar Bourke of County Mayo.   |                                
                                              |______________________________________________________
                                                                               |                   
                                                                             Sir William liath, d. 1324              
                                                                               |                   
                       ________________________________________________________|_________________________________________________                                  
                       |                         |                             |                         |                       |
                      Walter, d. 1332   Sir Edmund Albanach, d. 1375     Richard an Fhorbhair         Raymund              Ulick of Umhall
                                                                               |                                   
                _______________________________________________________________|                  
                |                                           |         |                            
                |                                           |         |                             
                Ulick Burke of Annaghkeen, d. 1343.     Raymond  Walter Óge
                |
                |
                Richard Óg Burke, d. 1387.
                |
                |
                Ulick an Fhiona Burke of Clanricarde

== See also ==
- House of Burgh, an Anglo-Norman and Hiberno-Norman dynasty founded in 1193
- William de Burgh
- Richard Mór de Burgh, the real Richard
- Clanricarde
