= Dick Burke (Australian footballer) =

Australian rules footballer

Personal information
- Full name: Dick Burke
- Born: 23 December 1938
- Height: 193 cm (6 ft 4 in)
- Weight: 92 kg (203 lb)
- Position: Ruck / Forward

Playing career^{1}
| Years | Club | Games (Goals) |
| 1959–63 | South Melbourne | 55 (33) |
- ^{1} Playing statistics correct to the end of 1963.

Dick Burke (born 23 December 1938) is a former Australian rules footballer who played with South Melbourne in the Victorian Football League (VFL).
