= Ulick Burke of Umhaill =

Irish noble (d.1343)

Ulick Burke (de Burgh) of Umhaill
- Uilleag de Búrca
- Died: 1343
- Parent: Richard an Forbair de Burke
- Relatives: William Liath de Burgh (grandfather); Ulick Burke of Annaghkeen (uncle)

Ulick Burke (or de Burgh) of Umhaill (English: /ˈjuːlɪk dəˈbɜːr/ YOO-lik də-BUR; died 1343) was the son of Richard an Forbair de Burke, and grandson of William Liath de Burgh (Burke).

== Family ==
He is the ancestor of the Bourkes of the Owles, in County Mayo, as well as being the person after whom the MacUlick Burkes (anglicized Gillick) were named. He is sometimes confused with his uncle, Ulick Burke of Annaghkeen.

== See also ==
- House of Burgh, an Anglo-Norman and Hiberno-Norman dynasty founded in 1193
- Lord of Connaught
- Earl of Ulster
- Clanricarde
