= John mac Richard Mór Burke =

Irish chieftain and noble (died 1536)

John mac Richard Mór Burke 10th Clanricarde
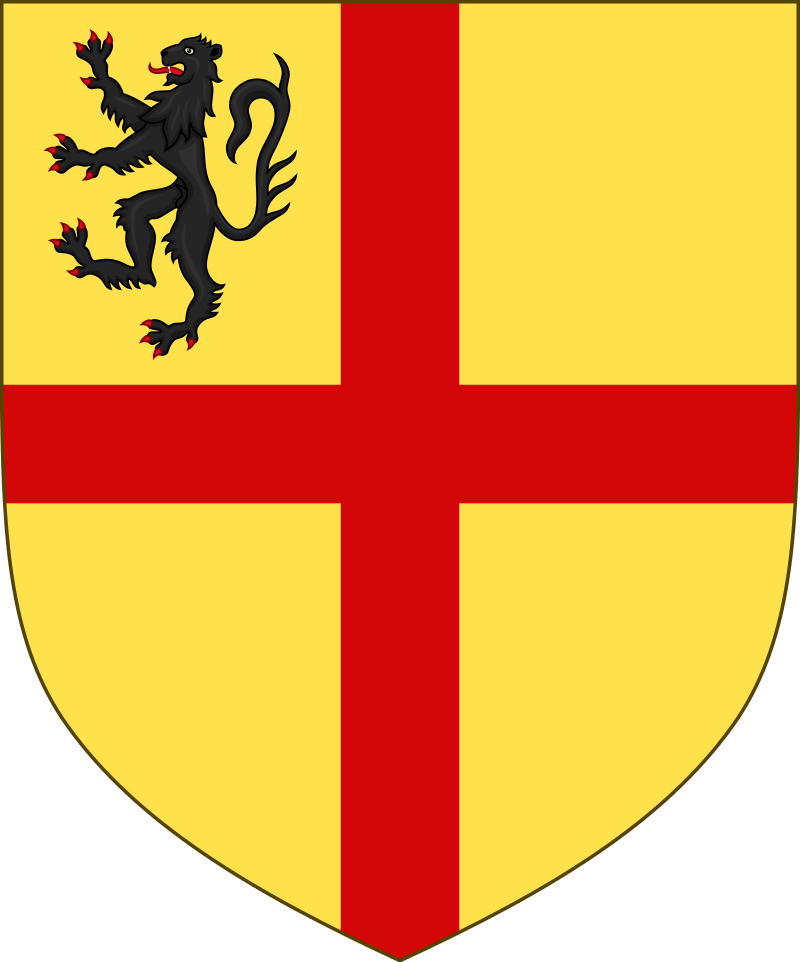
- Arms of de Burgh/Burke of Clanricarde.
- Native name: Sean mac Richard Mór de Búrca
- Born: Galway, Ireland
- Died: 1536
- Noble family: House of Burgh
- Father: Ricard mac Edmund Burke

John mac Richard Mór Burke, 10th Clanricarde or Mac William Uachtar (English: /klænˈrɪkɑːrd/ klan-RIK-ard; died 1536), was an Irish chieftain and noble.

== Background ==
Burke was a son of Ricard mac Edmund Burke of Roscam, County Galway (died c.1517), a grandson of Edmund Burke (d.1466), and great-grandson of Ulick Ruadh Burke, 5th Clanricarde (d.1485).

John mac Ricard succeeded his father's cousin, Richard Mór Burke, 9th Clanricarde (d.1530) as chieftain in 1530. Six years later, John was succeeded by the latter's younger brother, Richard Bacach Burke, 11th Clanricarde (d.1538).

== Annals of the Four Masters ==
From the Annals of the Four Masters,

M1536.18. The sons of Mac William of Clanrickard, John Duv and Redmond Roe, the two sons of Rickard, son of Ulick, were slain by the sons of the other Mac William, namely, the sons of Rickard Oge, they being overtaken in a pursuit, after they had gathered the preys of the country.

== Genealogy ==
  Ulick Ruadh Burke, d. 1485
   |
   |____________________________________________________________________________________________
   |                      |                        |                        |                 |
   |                      |                        |                        |                 |
   Edmund, d. 1486.       Ulick Fionn          Meiler, Abbot of Tuam      John, d. 1508.   Ricard Og, d. 1519.
   |                      |                                                                   |
   |                      |_______________________________________________________            |_________________
   Ricard, d. c. 1517.    |                          |              |            |            |                |
   |                      |                          |              |            |            |                |
   |                      Ulick Óge, d. 1519.    Richard Mór   Redmond    Richard Bacach    Ulick, d. 1551.  Thomas
   John, fl. 1536.                                   |                           |            |                |
                                                     |                           |            |                |
                                                Ulick na gCeann         Roland, Bp. Clonfert. Thomas Balbh  John of Derrymaclaghtna
                                                     |                         died 1580                       |
                          ___________________________|_____________________________                            |
                          |                    |     |               |             |                       Ricard, d. 1593.
                          |                    |     |               |             |                           |
                         Richard Sassanach   John  Thomas Feranta  Edmond   Redmond na Scuab         (Burke of Derrymaclaghtna)
                          | d. 1582.                 d. 1546.                  d. 1596.
                          |
                      Earls of Clanricarde

Clanricarde (Mac William Uachtar) Genealogy
- Richard an Fhorbhair de Burgh (d.1343)
  - Sir William (Ulick) de Burgh (d. 1343/53), 1st Mac William Uachtar (Upper Mac William) or Clanricarde (Galway)
    - Richard Óg Burke (d. 1387), 2nd Clanricarde
      - Ulick an Fhiona Burke (d. 1424), 3rd Clanricarde
        - Ulick Ruadh Burke (d. 1485), 5th Clanricarde
          - Edmund Burke (d. 1466)
            - Ricard of Roscam (d. 1517)
              - John mac Richard Mór Burke (d. 1536), 10th Clanricarde
          - Ulick Fionn Burke (d.1509), 6th Clanricarde
            - Ulick Óge Burke (d. 1520), 8th Clanricarde
            - Richard Mór Burke (d. 1530), 9th Clanricarde
              - Ulick na gCeann Burke (d. 1544), 12th Clanricarde, 1st Earl of Clanricarde (1543)
            - Richard Bacach Burke (d. 1538), 11th Clanricarde
          - Richard Óge Burke (d. 1519), 7th Clanricarde
            - Sir Uilleag Burke (d. 1551), 13th Clanricarde
      - William mac Ulick Burke (d. 1430), 4th Clanricarde
    - Edmund de Burgh (d. 1410)

== See also ==
- House of Burgh, an Anglo-Norman and Hiberno-Norman dynasty founded in 1193

Preceded by Richard Mór Burke	Clanricarde; 1530–1536	Succeeded by Richard Bacach Burke
