= William mac Ulick Burke =

Irish chieftain, noble and 4th Clanricarde or Mac William Uachtar (died 1430)

William mac Ulick Burke 4th Clanricarde
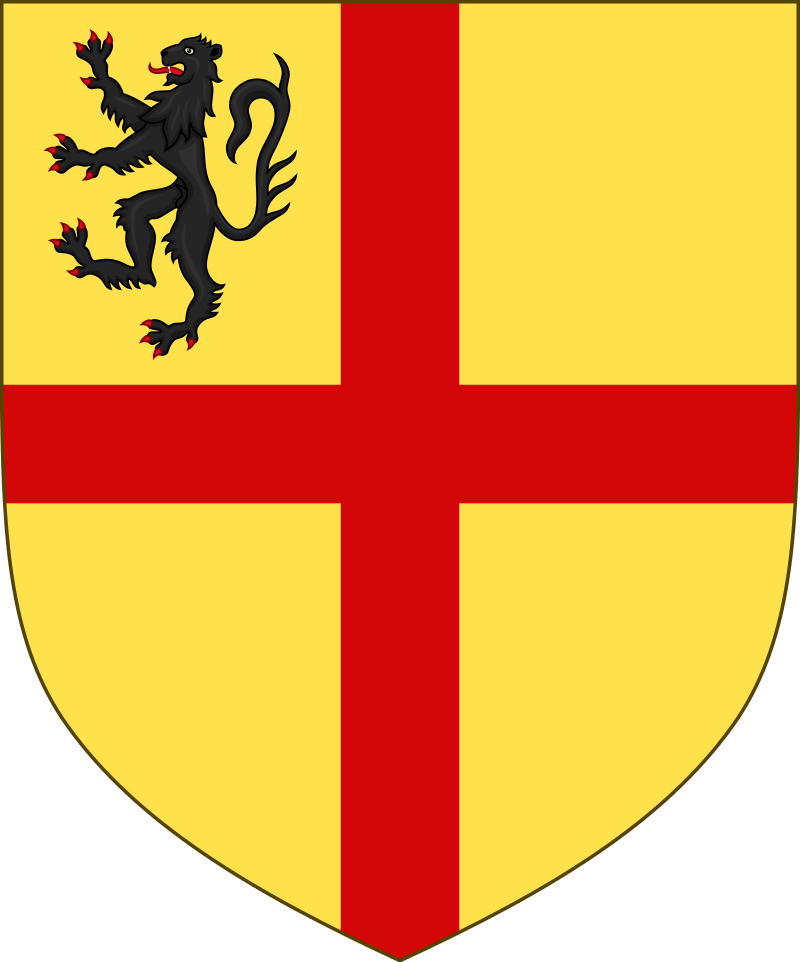
- Arms of de Burgh/Burke of Clanricarde.
- Native name: Uilleag mac Uilleag de Búrca
- Born: Galway, Ireland
- Died: 1430
- Noble family: House of Burgh

William mac Ulick Burke, 4th Clanricarde or Mac William Uachtar (Upper Mac William) (English: /klænˈrɪkɑːrd/ klan-RIK-ard; died 1430) was an Irish chieftain and noble.

== Annals of the Four Masters ==
William succeeded his elder brother, Ulick an Fhiona Burke, as chieftain. William's era is one of the more obscure reigns of a Clanricarde. The Annals of the Four Masters have only two references to his term:

1424. Mac William of Clannrickard (Ulick Burke) died in his own house, after having vanquished the Devil and the world.

1430. An army was led by Mac William of Clanrickard, Mac Donough of Tirerrill, and Brian, the son of Donnell, son of Murtough O'Conor of Sligo, into Conmaicne Cuile, where they caused great conflagrations, and slew Hugh, son of O'Conor Roe, and Carbry, the son of Brian O'Beirne; and then they returned home in triumph.

Only in A New History of Ireland IX does it give his year of death as 1430. He was later succeeded by his nephew, Ulick's son, Ulick Ruadh Burke, 5th Clanricarde who would reign until 1485.

== Genealogy ==
Clanricarde (Mac William Uachtar) Genealogy
- Richard an Fhorbhair de Burgh (d.1343)
  - Sir William (Ulick) de Burgh (d. 1343/53), 1st Mac William Uachtar (Upper Mac William) or Clanricarde (Galway)
    - Richard Óg Burke (d. 1387), 2nd Clanricarde
      - Ulick an Fhiona Burke (d. 1424), 3rd Clanricarde
        - Ulick Ruadh Burke (d. 1485), 5th Clanricarde
          - Edmund Burke (d. 1466)
            - Ricard of Roscam (d. 1517)
              - John mac Richard Mór Burke (d. 1536), 10th Clanricarde
          - Ulick Fionn Burke (d.1509), 6th Clanricarde
            - Ulick Óge Burke (d. 1520), 8th Clanricarde
            - Richard Mór Burke (d. 1530), 9th Clanricarde
              - Ulick na gCeann Burke (d. 1544), 12th Clanricarde, 1st Earl of Clanricarde (1543)
            - Richard Bacach Burke (d. 1538), 11th Clanricarde
          - Richard Óge Burke (d. 1519), 7th Clanricarde
            - Sir Uilleag Burke (d. 1551), 13th Clanricarde
      - William mac Ulick Burke (d. 1430), 4th Clanricarde
    - Edmund de Burgh (d. 1410)

== See also ==
- House of Burgh, an Anglo-Norman and Hiberno-Norman dynasty founded in 1193

| Preceded by Ulick an Fhiona Burke | Clanricarde; 1424–1430 | Succeeded by Ulick Ruadh Burke |
