= Richard Mór Burke =

Irish chieftain and noble (died 1530)

Richard Burke 9th Clanricarde
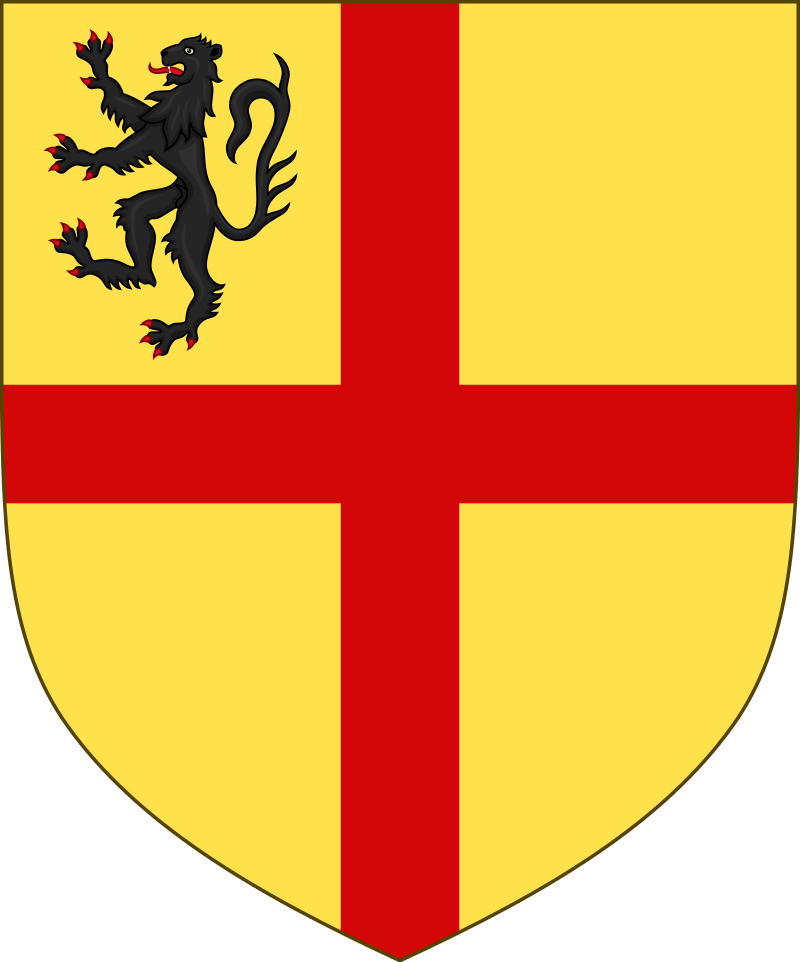
- Arms of de Burgh/Burke of Clanricarde.
- Native name: Ricard Mór de Búrca
- Born: Galway, Ireland
- Died: 1530
- Noble family: House of Burgh
- Spouse: Margaret Butler
- Father: Ulick Fionn Burke
- Mother: Slaine Ni Con Mara (Slany MacNamara)

Ricarde Mór Burke, 9th Clanricarde or Mac William Uachtar (English: /klænˈrɪkɑːrd/ klan-RIK-ard; died 1530) was an Irish chieftain and noble.

== Background ==
Burke was the second son of Ulick Fionn Burke, 6th Clanricarde (d.1509) and Slaine Ni Con Mara (Slany MacNamara), succeeding as chieftain in 1520 upon the death of his brother, Ulick Óge Burke, 8th Clanricarde (d.1520).

== Career ==
In 1522 he was part of a confederation of Connacht forces that marched to Sligo to give battle to the O'Donnells, who were conquering north Connacht. However, the expedition fell apart without a fight after the failure of Conn Bacach O'Neill to defeat O'Donnell.

== Family ==
Burke married Margaret Butler, daughter to Piers Butler, 8th Earl of Ormond (Ireland). He was succeeded by the grandson of his uncle Edmund (d.1466), John mac Richard Mór Burke, 10th Clanricarde (d.1536), who ruled till 1536.

== Genealogy ==
  Ulick Ruadh Burke, d. 1485
   |
   |____________________________________________________________________________________________
   |                      |                        |                        |                 |
   |                      |                        |                        |                 |
   Edmund, d. 1486.       Ulick Fionn          Meiler, Abbot of Tuam      John, d. 1508.   Ricard Og, d. 1519.
   |                      |                                                                   |
   |                      |_______________________________________________________            |_________________
   Ricard, d. c. 1517.    |                          |              |            |            |                |
   |                      |                          |              |            |            |                |
   |                      Ulick Óge, d. 1519.   Richard Mór   Redmond   Richard Bacach    Ulick, d. 1551.  Thomas
   John, fl. 1536.                                   |                           |            |                |
                                                     |                           |            |                |
                                                Ulick na gCeann         Roland, Bp. Clonfert. Thomas Balbh  John of Derrymaclaghtna
                                                     |                         died 1580                       |
                          ___________________________|_____________________________                            |
                          |                    |     |               |             |                       Ricard, d. 1593.
                          |                    |     |               |             |                           |
                         Richard Sassanach   John  Thomas Feranta  Edmond   Redmond na Scuab         (Burke of Derrymaclaghtna)
                          | d. 1582.                 d. 1546.                  d. 1596.
                          |
                      Earls of Clanricarde

Clanricarde (Mac William Uachtar) Genealogy
- Richard an Fhorbhair de Burgh (d.1343)
  - Sir William (Ulick) de Burgh (d. 1343/53), 1st Mac William Uachtar (Upper Mac William) or Clanricarde (Galway)
    - Richard Óg Burke (d. 1387), 2nd Clanricarde
      - Ulick an Fhiona Burke (d. 1424), 3rd Clanricarde
        - Ulick Ruadh Burke (d. 1485), 5th Clanricarde
          - Edmund Burke (d. 1466)
            - Ricard of Roscam (d. 1517)
              - John mac Richard Mór Burke (d. 1536), 10th Clanricarde
          - Ulick Fionn Burke (d.1509), 6th Clanricarde
            - Ulick Óge Burke (d. 1520), 8th Clanricarde
            - Richard Mór Burke (d. 1530), 9th Clanricarde
              - Ulick na gCeann Burke (d. 1544), 12th Clanricarde, 1st Earl of Clanricarde (1543)
            - Richard Bacach Burke (d. 1538), 11th Clanricarde
          - Richard Óge Burke (d. 1519), 7th Clanricarde
            - Sir Uilleag Burke (d. 1551), 13th Clanricarde
      - William mac Ulick Burke (d. 1430), 4th Clanricarde
    - Edmund de Burgh (d. 1410)

== See also ==
- House of Burgh, an Anglo-Norman and Hiberno-Norman dynasty founded in 1193

Preceded by Ulick Óge Burke	Clanricarde; 1520–1530	Succeeded by John mac Richard Mór Burke
