= Clanricarde =

Irish family of chieftains and nobles

Upper Mac William Mac William Uachtar
- 1333–1544
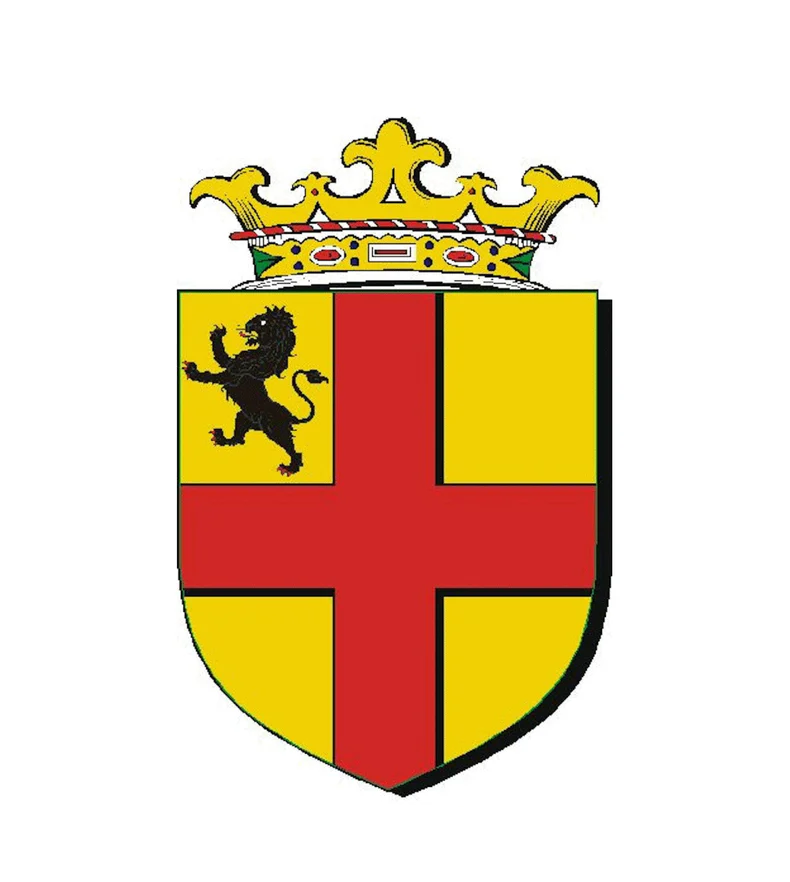
- Common languages: Irish
- Religion: Roman Catholicism
- Government: Tanistry
- Chief
  - 1333-1353: Ulick Burke of Annaghkeen
  - 1538-1544: Ulick na gCeann Burke
  - 1544-1551: Sir Uilleag Burke (disputed)
- History
  - Established: 1333
  - Disestablished: 1544
Preceded by	Succeeded by
House of Burke	Galway; Kingdom of Ireland

Clanricarde (English: /klænˈrɪkɑːrd/ klan-RIK-ard), also known as Mac William Uachtar (Upper Mac William) or the Galway Burkes, were a fully Gaelicised branch of the Hiberno-Norman House of Burgh who were important landowners in Ireland from the 13th to the 20th centuries.

== Territory ==
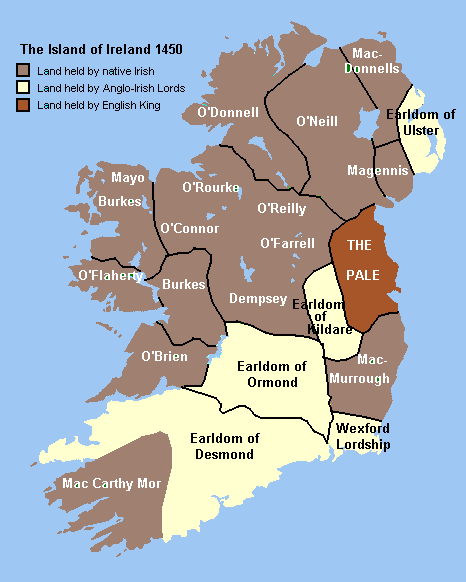
Clanricarde c. 1450, entitled Burkes

The territory, in what is now County Galway, Ireland, stretched from the barony of Clare in the north-west along the borders of County Mayo, to the River Shannon in the east. Territories Clannricarde claimed dominion over included Uí Maine, Kinela, de Bermingham's Country, Síol Anmchadha and southern Sil Muirdeagh were at times at war. Those clans accepted the family’s claims on varying occasions as well, and many family members were ceremonially brought into the Irish heritage.

== Title ==
The Clanricarde, was a Gaelic title meaning "Richard's family", or "(head of) Richard's family". The Richard in question was Richard Mór de Burgh, 1st Lord of Connacht (died 1243), son of William de Burgh, whose great-great-grandson became the first Clanricarde in the 1330s. The title was first recorded in 1335, and had probably been being used informally for a few generations. However, with the advent of the Burke Civil War (1333–1338) it came to denote the head of the Burkes of Upper or south Connacht based largely in what is now east and central County Galway. Simultaneously it was used to describe the lands held by the family.

The title Mac William Uachtar was also used as a synonym. It was a Gaelic title meaning "son of the upper William (de Burgh)". It was used to differentiate the Burkes of upper or south Connacht from their cousins, the Burkes of lower or north Connacht, who were known was the Mac William Lower.

However, it was never used as popularly as the term Clanricarde and was in any case abandoned by the end of the 16th century.

In 1543 the then Clanricarde was created Earl of Clanricarde by Henry VIII.

== The Clanricardes or Mac William Uachtar 1333–1544 ==
- Ulick Burke of Annaghkeen or Sir Uilleag de Burgh, 1st Clanricarde or Mac William Uachtar (1333–1353)
- Richard Óg Burke, 2nd Clanricarde or Mac William Uachtar (1353–1387)
- Ulick an Fhiona Burke, 3rd Clanricarde or Mac William Uachtar (1387–1424)
- William mac Ulick Burke, 4th Clanricarde or Mac William Uachtar (1424–1430)
- Ulick Ruadh Burke, 5th Clanricarde or Mac William Uachtar (1430–1485)
- Ulick Fionn Burke, 6th Clanricarde or Mac William Uachtar (1485–1509)
- Richard Óge Burke, 7th Clanricarde or Mac William Uachtar (1509–1519)
- Ulick Óge Burke, 8th Clanricarde or Mac William Uachtar (1519–1520)
- Richard Mór Burke, 9th Clanricarde or Mac William Uachtar (1520–1530)
- John mac Richard Mór Burke, 10th Clanricarde or Mac William Uachtar (1530–1536)
- Richard Bacach Burke, 11th Clanricarde or Mac William Uachtar (1536–1538)
- Ulick na gCeann Burke, 12th Clanricarde or Mac William Uachtar and 1st Earl of Clanricarde (1538–1544)
- Sir Uilleag Burke, (disputed) 13th Clanricarde or Mac William Uachtar (1544–51)

== Genealogy ==
de Burgh genealogy
- Walter de Burgh of Burgh Castle, Norfolk m. Alice
  - William de Burgh (d. 1206) m. Daughter of Domnall Mór Ó Briain, King of Thomond
    - Richard Mór / Óge de Burgh, 1st Lord of Connaught m. Egidia de Lacy, Lady of Connacht
      - Sir Richard de Burgh (d.1248), 2nd Lord of Connaught
      - Walter de Burgh, 1st Earl of Ulster (d. 1271)
        - Richard Óg de Burgh, 2nd Earl of Ulster (1259–1326)
          - John de Burgh m. Elizabeth de Clare
            - William Donn de Burgh, 3rd Earl of Ulster (1312–33) m. Maud of Lancaster
              - Elizabeth de Burgh, 4th Countess of Ulster (1332–63) m. Lionel of Antwerp, 1st Duke of Clarence
                - Philippa Plantagenet, 5th Countess of Ulster (1355–82) m. Edmund Mortimer, 3rd Earl of March
                - Roger Mortimer, 4th Earl of March, 6th Earl of Ulster (1374–98)
                  - Edmund Mortimer, 5th Earl of March, 7th Earl of Ulster (1391–1425)
                  - Anne Mortimer (1388–1411) m. Richard of Conisburgh, 3rd Earl of Cambridge
                    - Richard of York, 3rd Duke of York, 8th Earl of Ulster (1411–60)
                      - Edward IV (Edward, 4th Duke of York, 9th Earl of Ulster)
                        - House of York (Kings and Queens of England and Ireland)
          - Edmond de Burgh
            - Sir Richard Burke
              - Walter Burke (d. 1432)
                - Burkes of Castleconnell and Brittas (Clanwilliam)
              - Uileag Carragh Burke
                - Burkes of Cois tSiúire (Clanwilliam)
            - Sir David Burke,
              - Burkes of Muskerryquirk (Clanwilliam)
          - Elizabeth, Queen of Scotland m. Robert I of Scotland
        - Theobald de Burgh
        - William de Burgh
        - Thomas de Burgh
        - Egidia de Burgh
      - William Óg de Burgh (d. 1270)
        - William Liath de Burgh (d. 1324)
          - Sir Walter Liath de Burgh, d. 1332
          - Sir Edmond Albanach de Burgh (d. 1375), 1st Mac William Íochtar (Lower Mac William), (Mayo)
            - Mac William Íochtars, Viscounts Mayo and Earls of Mayo
          - John de Burgh (1350–98), Chancellor of the University of Cambridge
          - Richard an Fhorbhair de Burgh
            - Sir Ulick de Burgh (d. 1343/53), 1st Mac William Uachtar (Upper Mac William) or Clanricarde (Galway)
              - Richard Óg Burke (d. 1387)
                - Ulick an Fhiona Burke
                  - Clanricardes, Earls of Marquesses of Clanricarde
            - Raymond de Burgh
            - Walter Óge de Burgh
          - Raymund de Burgh
          - Ulick de Burgh of Umhall
      - Alice de Burgh
      - Margery de Burgh
      - Matilda de Burgh
      - Daughter de Burgh
    - Hubert de Burgh, Bishop of Limerick (d. 1250)
    - William de Burgh, Sheriff of Connacht
  - Hubert de Burgh, 1st Earl of Kent (d. 1243) m.
    - John de Burgh
    - Hubert de Burgh
    - Hubert de Burgh
      - Barons Burgh
  - Geoffrey de Burgh, Bishop of Ely (d. 1228)
  - Thomas de Burgh
Clanricarde (Mac William Uachtar) genealogy
- Richard an Fhorbhair de Burgh (d.1343)
  - Sir William (Ulick) de Burgh (d. 1343/53), 1st Mac William Uachtar (Upper Mac William) or Clanricarde (Galway)
    - Richard Óg Burke (d. 1387), 2nd Clanricarde
      - Ulick an Fhiona Burke (d. 1424), 3rd Clanricarde
        - Ulick Ruadh Burke (d. 1485), 5th Clanricarde
          - Edmund Burke (d. 1466)
            - Ricard of Roscam (d. 1517)
              - John mac Richard Mór Burke (d. 1536), 10th Clanricarde
          - Ulick Fionn Burke (d.1509), 6th Clanricarde
            - Ulick Óge Burke (d. 1520), 8th Clanricarde
            - Richard Mór Burke (d. 1530), 9th Clanricarde
              - Ulick na gCeann Burke (d. 1544), 12th Clanricarde, 1st Earl of Clanricarde (1543)
            - Richard Bacach Burke (d. 1538), 11th Clanricarde
          - Richard Óge Burke (d. 1519), 7th Clanricarde
            - Sir Uilleag Burke (d. 1551), 13th Clanricarde
      - William mac Ulick Burke (d. 1430), 4th Clanricarde
    - Edmund de Burgh (d. 1410)

== See also ==
- House of Burgh, an Anglo-Norman and Hiberno-Norman dynasty founded in 1193
- Mac William Íochtar, Bourkes of Mayo (Lower Connaught)
- Burke Civil War
- Earl of Clanricarde
