= Richard Óge Burke =

Irish chieftain and noble (died 1519)

Richard Óge Burke 7th Clanricarde
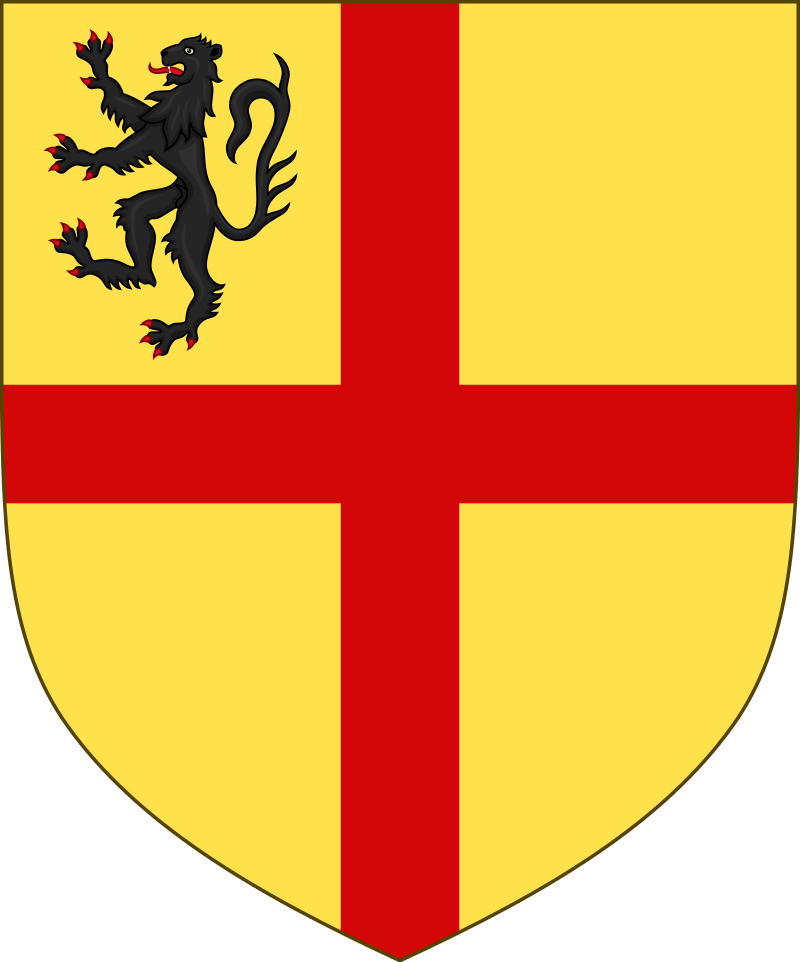
- Arms of de Burgh/Burke of Clanricarde.
- Native name: Ricard Óge de Búrca
- Born: Galway, Ireland
- Died: 1519
- Noble family: House of Burgh
- Issue: Sir Uilleag Burke
- Father: Ulick Ruadh Burke

Richard Óge Burke, 7th Clanricarde or Mac William Uachtar (English: /klænˈrɪkɑːrd/ klan-RIK-ard; died 1519) was an Irish chieftain and noble who was the ancestor of the Burkes of Derrymaclachtna.

== Life ==
Richard Óge was a son of a previous chieftain, Ulick Ruadh Burke, 5th Clanricarde (d.1485), and a brother of Ulick Fionn Burke, 6th Clanricarde (d.1509) whom he succeeded as chieftain in 1509. Richard's son, Sir Uilleag Burke, became 13th Clanricarde in disputed circumstances in 1544.

No other Burke of his line would again rise to overall leadership of the Burkes, but he was ancestor to the Burke family of Derrymaclachtna Castle, Lackagh, County Galway, who were an important branch of the family.

== Genealogy ==
  Ulick Ruadh Burke, d. 1485
   |
   |____________________________________________________________________________________________
   |                      |                        |                        |                 |
   |                      |                        |                        |                 |
   Edmund, d. 1486.       Ulick Fionn          Meiler, Abbot of Tuam      John, d. 1508.  Richard Óge, d. 1519.
   |                      |                                                                   |
   |                      |_______________________________________________________            |_________________
   Ricard, d. c. 1517.    |                          |              |            |            |                |
   |                      |                          |              |            |            |                |
   |                   Ulick Óge, d. 1519.  Richard Mór   Redmond   Richard Bacach    Ulick, d. 1551.        Thomas
   John, fl. 1536.                                   |                           |            |                |
                                                     |                           |            |                |
                                                Ulick na gCeann         Roland, Bp. Clonfert. Thomas Balbh  John of Derrymaclaghtna
                                                     |                         died 1580                       |
                          ___________________________|_____________________________                            |
                          |                    |     |               |             |                       Ricard, d. 1593.
                          |                    |     |               |             |                           |
                         Richard Sassanach   John  Thomas Feranta  Edmond   Redmond na Scuab         (Burke of Derrymaclaghtna)
                          | d. 1582.                 d. 1546.                  d. 1596.
                          |
                      Earl of Clanricarde

Clanricarde (Mac William Uachtar) Genealogy
- Richard an Fhorbhair de Burgh (d.1343)
  - Sir William (Ulick) de Burgh (d. 1343/53), 1st Mac William Uachtar (Upper Mac William) or Clanricarde (Galway)
    - Richard Óg Burke (d. 1387), 2nd Clanricarde
      - Ulick an Fhiona Burke (d. 1424), 3rd Clanricarde
        - Ulick Ruadh Burke (d. 1485), 5th Clanricarde
          - Edmund Burke (d. 1466)
            - Ricard of Roscam (d. 1517)
              - John mac Richard Mór Burke (d. 1536), 10th Clanricarde
          - Ulick Fionn Burke (d.1509), 6th Clanricarde
            - Ulick Óge Burke (d. 1520), 8th Clanricarde
            - Richard Mór Burke (d. 1530), 9th Clanricarde
              - Ulick na gCeann Burke (d. 1544), 12th Clanricarde, 1st Earl of Clanricarde (1543)
            - Richard Bacach Burke (d. 1538), 11th Clanricarde
          - Richard Óge Burke (d. 1519), 7th Clanricarde
            - Sir Uilleag Burke (d. 1551), 13th Clanricarde
      - William mac Ulick Burke (d. 1430), 4th Clanricarde
    - Edmund de Burgh (d. 1410)

== See also ==
- House of Burgh, an Anglo-Norman and Hiberno-Norman dynasty founded in 1193

Preceded by Ulick Fionn Burke	Clanricarde; 1509–1519	Succeeded by Ulick Óge Burke
