= Richard Óg Burke =

Irish chieftain, noble and 2nd Clanricarde or Mac William Uachtar (died 1387)

Richard Óg Burke 2nd Clanricarde
- Ricard Óg de Búrca
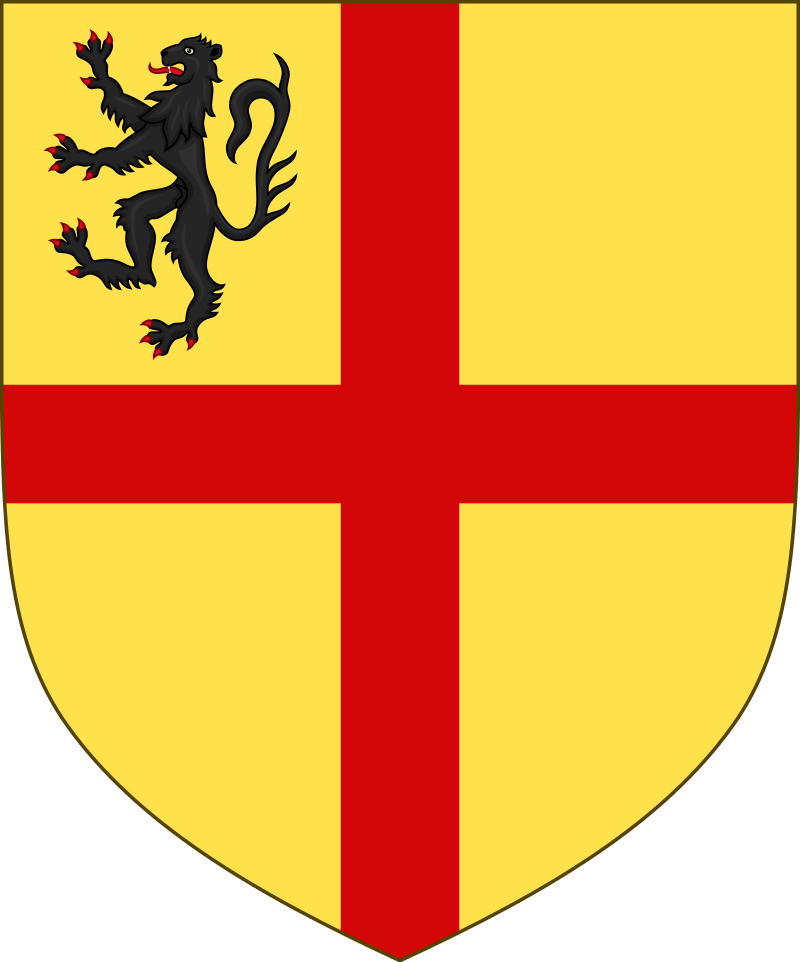
- Arms of de Burgh/Burke of Clanricarde.
- Died: 1387
- Children: Ulick an Fhiona Burke
- Parent: Sir Ulick Burke

Richard Óg Burke, 2nd Clanricarde or Mac William Uachtar (English: /klænˈrɪkɑːrd/ klan-RIK-ard; died 1387) was an Irish chieftain and nobleman who was the son of Sir Ulick Burke or Uilleag de Burgh, 1st Clanricarde (d.1343/1353).

== Biography ==
Richard died in 1387, and was succeeded by his son, Ulick an Fhiona Burke, 3rd Clanricarde (d.1424).

== Annals of the Four Masters ==
From the Annals of the Four Masters:

M1366.10. A great war broke out between the English of Connaught. Mac Maurice was banished from his territory by Mac William; and Mac Maurice fled for protection to the Clann-Rickard. Mac William, Hugh O'Conor, King of Connaught, and William O'Kelly, Lord of Hy-Many, marched with an army to Upper Connaught against the Clann-Rickard, and remained there nearly three months engaged in mutual hostilities, until at last Mac William subdued the Clann-Rickard; whereupon the hostages of these latter were delivered up to him, and he returned to his country in triumph.

== Family ==
Richard married a daughter of O'Madden of Síol Anmchadha. They had two children:

- Ulick an Fhiona Burke, 3rd Clanricarde (d.1424)
- William mac Ulick Burke, 4th Clanricarde (d.1430)

== Genealogy ==
Clanricarde (Mac William Uachtar) Genealogy
- Richard an Fhorbhair de Burgh (d.1343)
  - Sir William (Ulick) de Burgh (d. 1343/53), 1st Mac William Uachtar (Upper Mac William) or Clanricarde (Galway)
    - Richard Óg Burke (d. 1387), 2nd Clanricarde
      - Ulick an Fhiona Burke (d. 1424), 3rd Clanricarde
        - Ulick Ruadh Burke (d. 1485), 5th Clanricarde
          - Edmund Burke (d. 1466)
            - Ricard of Roscam (d. 1517)
              - John mac Richard Mór Burke (d. 1536), 10th Clanricarde
          - Ulick Fionn Burke (d.1509), 6th Clanricarde
            - Ulick Óge Burke (d. 1520), 8th Clanricarde
            - Richard Mór Burke (d. 1530), 9th Clanricarde
              - Ulick na gCeann Burke (d. 1544), 12th Clanricarde, 1st Earl of Clanricarde (1543)
            - Richard Bacach Burke (d. 1538), 11th Clanricarde
          - Richard Óge Burke (d. 1519), 7th Clanricarde
            - Sir Uilleag Burke (d. 1551), 13th Clanricarde
      - William mac Ulick Burke (d. 1430), 4th Clanricarde
    - Edmund de Burgh (d. 1410)

== See also ==
- House of Burgh, an Anglo-Norman and Hiberno-Norman dynasty founded in 1193

Preceded by Ulick Burke of Annaghkeen	Clanricarde; 1353–1387	Succeeded by Ulick an Fhiona Burke
