= Uilleag de Burgh =

Irish chieftain, noble and 1st Clanricarde or Mac William Uachtar (died 1343/53)

Sir Ulick de Burgh Uilleag de Búrca 1st Clanricarde
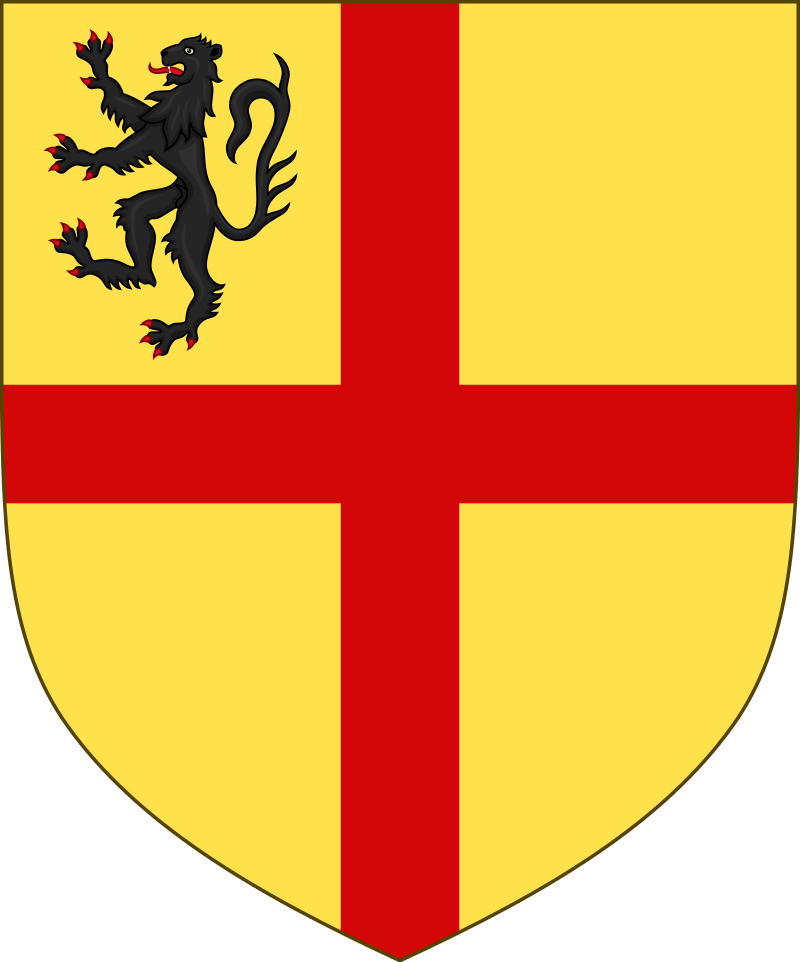
- Arms of de Burgh/Burke of Clanricarde.
- Native name: Uilleag de Búrca
- Born: Galway, Ireland
- Died: 1343/1353
- Noble family: House of Burgh
- Issue: Richard Óg Burke
- Father: William Liath de Burgh
- Mother: Princess Finola Ni Briain

Sir Uilleag (Ulick) de Burgh (Burke), 1st Clanricarde or Mac William Uachtar (English: /ˈjuːlɪk dəˈbɜːr ... klænˈrɪkɑːrd/ YOO-lik də-BUR ... klan-RIK-ard; died 1343 or 1353) was an Irish chieftain and noble who was leader of one of the three factions who fought the Burke Civil War in the 1330s. By the end of the conflict he had established himself and his descendants as Clanricarde, also known as Mac William Uachtar (Upper Mac William), independent lords of Galway. He was succeeded by his son, Richard Óg Burke, 2nd Clanricarde (d.1387).

== Family background ==
There are differing views as to Burke's ancestry.

According to the Book of the Burkes (Historia et Genealogia Familiae de Burgo), a genealogical manuscript made in the 1570s for Seaán mac Oliver Bourke, 17th Mac William Íochtar (d.1580) of the Burkes of County Mayo, Burke was a son of Richard an Fhorbhair mac William de Burgh, a natural son of William Laith de Burgh (d.1324), who was a son of Richard Óg de Burgh, illegitimate son of William de Burgh (d.1206) original founder of the de Burgh/Burke dynasty in Ireland. The same descent is given by Duald MacFirbis in his Leabhar na nGenealach (Book of the Genealogies), mostly compiled in 1649-50, and its revised abridgement the Cuimre na nGenealach (Binding of the Genealogies) of 1666. This is the ancestry presented by John O'Hart in his Irish pedigrees; or, The origin and stem of the Irish nation (1876), and in the Oxford A New History of Ireland (1984), where the authors write "The origins of the Clanricard line are not absolutely proven, but the descent given is that in the best Irish genealogical sources and is not contradicted by contemporary sources."

On this view, Burke would have been the leader of an illegitimate branch of the de Burgh family that were already strong in south Connaught, and were able to use the conflict of the 1330s to establish themselves as an independent lordship. The name "Clanricarde", first recorded in 1335, would reflect their ancestry from Richard Óg de Burgh, and might have already been in informal use for a number of generations.

However, as noted by Martin J. Blake in 1911, the pedigree above is not without its problems. In particular, William Liath de Burgh, the founder of the Franciscan Abbey in Galway, is known to have died in 1324. As Blake writes "it is obvious, having regard to these dates, that he could hardly have been a grandson (as these writers represent him to be) of the first William de Burgh in Ireland, who died early in A.D. 1206 as the English State Records prove." The MacFirbis pedigree also omits Burke's successor, Richard Óg Burke, 2nd Clanricarde (d.1387) whose existence is well attested. Blake concludes that MacFirbis and the earlier manuscript "are accurate as regards the genealogy they give of the Mac William Bourkes of Mayo (Mac William Eighter) but that they had no accurate information regarding the early part of the pedigree of the Mac William Burkes of Clan-Ricard (Mac William Oughter) and could only make a guess at it–with the not surprising result, that they made a mess of it."

A different ancestry for Burke was given by John Lodge in his Peerage of Ireland (2nd ed, 1789), and followed by Edmund Lodge in his Genealogy of the Existing British Peerage (1832).

According to this version William Liath de Burgh was identical with the William de Burgh who was the son of William Óg de Burgh (d.1270), that died at the Battle of Áth an gCeap in 1270, and father of Walter Liath de Burgh (d.1332), whose starving to death in 1332 triggered the Burke civil war. On this view William Liath de Burgh was the dominant Anglo-Norman noble in all Connaught, second in authority only to his cousin Richard Óg de Burgh, 2nd Earl of Ulster among the de Burghs. Ulick de Burgh is presented as the son of William Liath de Burgh, and so brother to Edmond Albanach de Burgh, 1st Mac William Íochtar (d.1375) and Walter de Burgh, with Ulick and Edmond ultimately partitioning Connaught between themselves at the end of the conflict as brothers. Blake asserts that the Burke who was a son of Richard an Fhorbhair should be identified with Ulick Burke of Umhaill (d.1343) ancestor of the Bourkes of the Owles, in County Mayo.

Moreover, recent scholarship has shed light on the true early ancestry of the de Burgh (Burke) family, most notedly that Richard Óg de Burgh, illegitimate son of William de Burgh (d. 1206), never existed and was a complete genealogical invention. Both Oxford Dictionary of National Biography articles published in the 21st century on William de Burgh (died 1206) and his son Richard de Burgh (died 1243) confirm that the elder William (died 1206) had only one son named Richard de Burgh (died 1243). As such, it is widely accepted amongst eminent genealogical historians that William de Burgh (died 1206) had just three sons (Richard Mór de Burgh, 1st Lord of Connacht; Hubert de Burgh, Bishop of Limerick; and William de Burgh, Sheriff of Connacht) with only one being named Richard de Burgh. Therefore, it is Richard Mór de Burgh's (died 1243) youngest son, William Óg de Burgh (died 1270), who is the ancestor of the Clanricarde. The family tree below represents the best scholarship on the different branches and lines of descent of the early de Burgh (Burke) family.

== The First Clanricarde ==
On the death of Richard Óg de Burgh, 2nd Earl of Ulster in 1326, the earldom passed to his grandson William Donn de Burgh, 3rd Earl of Ulster, then 14 years old. William became increasingly estranged and suspicious of his two principal lieutenants, Henry de Mandeville in Ulster and Walter de Burgh in Connaught. In 1331 he had Henry de Mandeville arrested, and the following year he had Walter de Burgh with two of his brothers captured and imprisoned. He then ordered that Walter should be starved to death. Gylle de Burgh, the sister of Walter and wife of Robert de Mandeville, Henry's brother, plotted revenge and in June 1333 the young Earl was cut down as he passed through Carrickfergus by members of his own retinue, members and associates of the de Mandeville family.

This action triggered open civil war between the different branches of the de Burgh family. The Earl's heir-general, his infant daughter, Elizabeth de Burgh, 4th Countess of Ulster, was taken to England on her father's death and lost control over her lands. Warfare broke out among the Gaelic-Irish tenants of the late Earl – many of whom expelled the Anglo-Irish – and among the three principal members of the de Burgh family:

- Edmond de Burgh of Castleconnell (now in County Limerick), surviving brother of the second Earl, senior member of the Earl's direct family.
- Edmond Albanach de Burgh of north Connacht (mainly County Mayo)
- Ulick Burke of Annaghkeen in south Connacht (mainly east County Galway)

A series of raids and counter-raids ensued, with Edmond de Burgh reportedly laying waste much of Connaught in 1335. But in 1338 Edmond de Burgh was cornered and caught at Ballinrobe by his cousin Edmond Albanach, who according to the Annals of the Four Masters "fastened a stone to his neck and drowned him in Lough Mask".

In the aftermath by 1340 the much-weakened family had divided into three separate, independent lordships:

- Clanwilliam Burke of County Limerick
- Mac William Íochtar of County Mayo
- Clanricarde of County Galway

Ulick remained Clanricarde until his death in 1343 (or 1353 ?), to be succeeded by his son, Richard Óg Burke.

He is said to have possessed an unusual nickname — Bod-an-Balcuigh, which translated to "Penis of Power".

== Family ==
Ulick de Burgh married and had three children:

- Richard Óg Burke, 2nd Clanricarde (d.1387)
- Redmond Burke (the ancestor of the Burkes of Castle Hackett, Ower Cloghan and Athkip)
- Edmond Burke (the ancestor of the Burkes of Pallice, Lisnard and Derry)

== Genealogy ==
de Burgh Genealogy
- Walter de Burgh of Burgh Castle, Norfolk m. Alice
  - William de Burgh (d. 1206) m. Daughter of Domnall Mór Ó Briain, King of Thomond
    - Richard Mór / Óge de Burgh, 1st Lord of Connaught m. Egidia de Lacy, Lady of Connacht
      - Sir Richard de Burgh (d.1248), 2nd Lord of Connaught
      - Walter de Burgh, 1st Earl of Ulster (d. 1271)
        - Richard Óg de Burgh, 2nd Earl of Ulster (1259–1326)
          - John de Burgh m. Elizabeth de Clare
            - William Donn de Burgh, 3rd Earl of Ulster (1312–33) m. Maud of Lancaster
              - Elizabeth de Burgh, 4th Countess of Ulster (1332–63) m. Lionel of Antwerp, 1st Duke of Clarence
                - Philippa Plantagenet, 5th Countess of Ulster (1355–82) m. Edmund Mortimer, 3rd Earl of March
                - Roger Mortimer, 4th Earl of March, 6th Earl of Ulster (1374–98)
                  - Edmund Mortimer, 5th Earl of March, 7th Earl of Ulster (1391–1425)
                  - Anne Mortimer (1388–1411) m. Richard of Conisburgh, 3rd Earl of Cambridge
                    - Richard of York, 3rd Duke of York, 8th Earl of Ulster (1411–60)
                      - Edward IV (Edward, 4th Duke of York, 9th Earl of Ulster)
                        - House of York (Kings and Queens of England and Ireland)
          - Edmond de Burgh
            - Sir Richard Burke
              - Walter Burke (d. 1432)
                - Burkes of Castleconnell and Brittas (Clanwilliam)
              - Uileag Carragh Burke
                - Burkes of Cois tSiúire (Clanwilliam)
            - Sir David Burke,
              - Burkes of Muskerryquirk (Clanwilliam)
          - Elizabeth, Queen of Scotland m. Robert I of Scotland
        - Theobald de Burgh
        - William de Burgh
        - Thomas de Burgh
        - Egidia de Burgh
      - William Óg de Burgh (d. 1270)
        - William Liath de Burgh (d. 1324)
          - Sir Walter Liath de Burgh, d. 1332
          - Sir Edmond Albanach de Burgh (d. 1375), 1st Mac William Íochtar (Lower Mac William), (Mayo)
            - Mac William Íochtars, Viscounts Mayo and Earls of Mayo
          - John de Burgh (1350–98), Chancellor of the University of Cambridge
          - Richard an Fhorbhair de Burgh
            - Sir Ulick de Burgh (d. 1343/53), 1st Mac William Uachtar (Upper Mac William) or Clanricarde (Galway)
              - Richard Óg Burke (d. 1387)
                - Ulick an Fhiona Burke
                  - Clanricardes, Earls of Marquesses of Clanricarde
            - Raymond de Burgh
            - Walter Óge de Burgh
          - Raymund de Burgh
          - Ulick de Burgh of Umhall
      - Alice de Burgh
      - Margery de Burgh
      - Matilda de Burgh
      - Daughter de Burgh
    - Hubert de Burgh, Bishop of Limerick (d. 1250)
    - William de Burgh, Sheriff of Connacht
  - Hubert de Burgh, 1st Earl of Kent (d. 1243) m.
    - John de Burgh
    - Hubert de Burgh
    - Hubert de Burgh
      - Barons Burgh
  - Geoffrey de Burgh, Bishop of Ely (d. 1228)
  - Thomas de Burgh
Clanricarde (Mac William Uachtar) Genealogy
- Richard an Fhorbhair de Burgh (d.1343)
  - Sir William (Ulick) de Burgh (d. 1343/53), 1st Mac William Uachtar (Upper Mac William) or Clanricarde (Galway)
    - Richard Óg Burke (d. 1387), 2nd Clanricarde
      - Ulick an Fhiona Burke (d. 1424), 3rd Clanricarde
        - Ulick Ruadh Burke (d. 1485), 5th Clanricarde
          - Edmund Burke (d. 1466)
            - Ricard of Roscam (d. 1517)
              - John mac Richard Mór Burke (d. 1536), 10th Clanricarde
          - Ulick Fionn Burke (d.1509), 6th Clanricarde
            - Ulick Óge Burke (d. 1520), 8th Clanricarde
            - Richard Mór Burke (d. 1530), 9th Clanricarde
              - Ulick na gCeann Burke (d. 1544), 12th Clanricarde, 1st Earl of Clanricarde (1543)
            - Richard Bacach Burke (d. 1538), 11th Clanricarde
          - Richard Óge Burke (d. 1519), 7th Clanricarde
            - Sir Uilleag Burke (d. 1551), 13th Clanricarde
      - William mac Ulick Burke (d. 1430), 4th Clanricarde
    - Edmund de Burgh (d. 1410)

== See also ==
- House of Burgh, an Anglo-Norman and Hiberno-Norman dynasty founded in 1193

Preceded by New creation	Clanricarde; 1333–1353	Succeeded by Richard Óg Burke
