= Richard Bacach Burke =

Irish chieftain, noble, and 11th Clanricarde or Mac William Uachtar (died 1538)

Richard Bacach Burke 11th Clanricarde
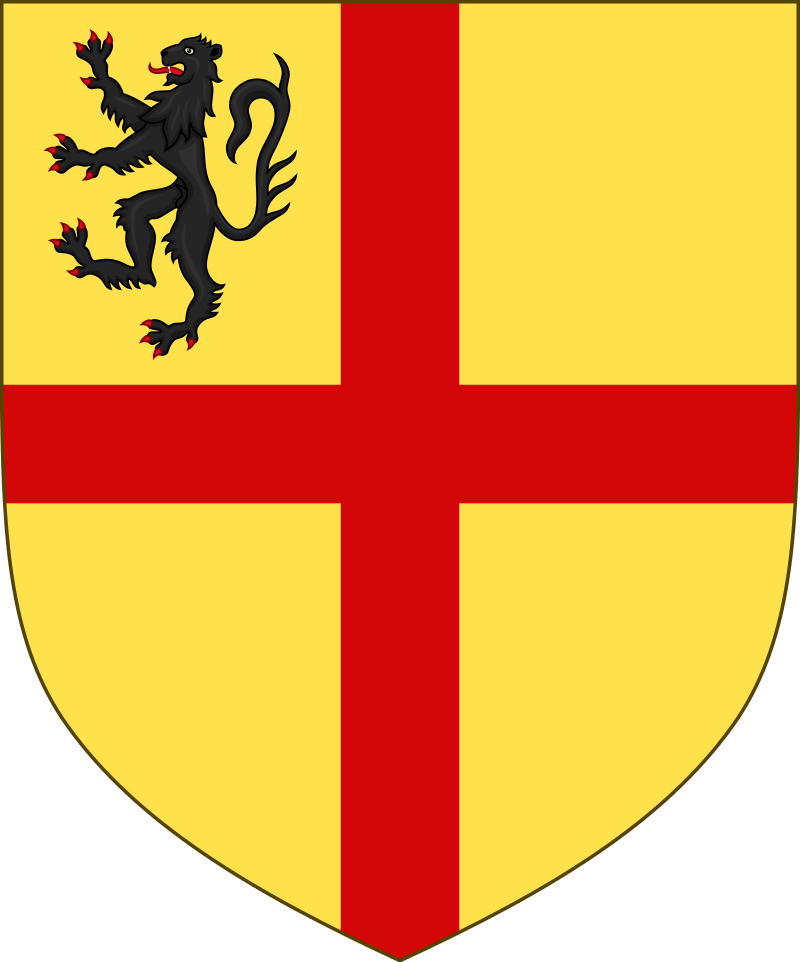
- Arms of de Burgh/Burke of Clanricarde.
- Native name: Ricard Bacach de Búrca
- Born: Galway, Ireland
- Died: 1538
- Noble family: House of Burgh
- Father: Ulick Fionn Burke

Richard Bacach Burke, 11th Clanricarde or Mac William Uachtar (English: /klænˈrɪkɑːrd/ klan-RIK-ard; died 1538) was an Irish chieftain and noble who was the ancestor of the Burkes of County Galway.

== Background ==
Burke was a son of Ulick Fionn Burke, 6th Clanricarde (d.1509). He succeeded his cousin's son, John mac Richard Mór Burke, 10th Clanricarde, as chieftain in 1538. Richard was deposed in 1538 by his nephew, Ulick na gCeann Burke, 12th Clanricarde (d.1544).

All subsequent chiefs of the Galway Burkes and Earls of Clanricarde would descend from Ulick, while Richard Bachach's descendants disappeared into obscurity.

== Genealogy ==
  Ulick Ruadh Burke, d. 1485
   |
   |____________________________________________________________________________________________
   |                      |                        |                        |                 |
   |                      |                        |                        |                 |
   Edmund, d. 1486.       Ulick Fionn          Meiler, Abbot of Tuam      John, d. 1508.   Ricard Og, d. 1519.
   |                      |                                                                   |
   |                      |_______________________________________________________            |_________________
   Ricard, d. c. 1517.    |                          |              |            |            |                |
   |                      |                          |              |            |            |                |
   |                      Ulick Óge, d. 1519.    Richard Mór   Redmond   Richard Bacach    Ulick, d. 1551.  Thomas
   John, fl. 1536.                                   |                           |            |                |
                                                     |                           |            |                |
                                                Ulick na gCeann         Roland, Bp. Clonfert. Thomas Balbh  John of Derrymaclaghtna
                                                     |                         died 1580                       |
                          ___________________________|_____________________________                            |
                          |                    |     |               |             |                       Ricard, d. 1593.
                          |                    |     |               |             |                           |
                         Richard Sassanach   John  Thomas Feranta  Edmond   Redmond na Scuab         (Burke of Derrymaclaghtna)
                          | d. 1582.                 d. 1546.                  d. 1596.
                          |
                      Earls of Clanricarde

Clanricarde (Mac William Uachtar) Genealogy
- Richard an Fhorbhair de Burgh (d.1343)
  - Sir William (Ulick) de Burgh (d. 1343/53), 1st Mac William Uachtar (Upper Mac William) or Clanricarde (Galway)
    - Richard Óg Burke (d. 1387), 2nd Clanricarde
      - Ulick an Fhiona Burke (d. 1424), 3rd Clanricarde
        - Ulick Ruadh Burke (d. 1485), 5th Clanricarde
          - Edmund Burke (d. 1466)
            - Ricard of Roscam (d. 1517)
              - John mac Richard Mór Burke (d. 1536), 10th Clanricarde
          - Ulick Fionn Burke (d.1509), 6th Clanricarde
            - Ulick Óge Burke (d. 1520), 8th Clanricarde
            - Richard Mór Burke (d. 1530), 9th Clanricarde
              - Ulick na gCeann Burke (d. 1544), 12th Clanricarde, 1st Earl of Clanricarde (1543)
            - Richard Bacach Burke (d. 1538), 11th Clanricarde
          - Richard Óge Burke (d. 1519), 7th Clanricarde
            - Sir Uilleag Burke (d. 1551), 13th Clanricarde
      - William mac Ulick Burke (d. 1430), 4th Clanricarde
    - Edmund de Burgh (d. 1410)

== See also ==
- House of Burgh, an Anglo-Norman and Hiberno-Norman dynasty founded in 1193

Preceded by John mac Richard Mór Burke	Clanricarde; 1536–1538	Succeeded by Ulick na gCeann Burke
