= Ulick Fionn Burke =

Irish chieftain and noble (died 1509)

Ulick Fionn Burke 6th Clanricarde
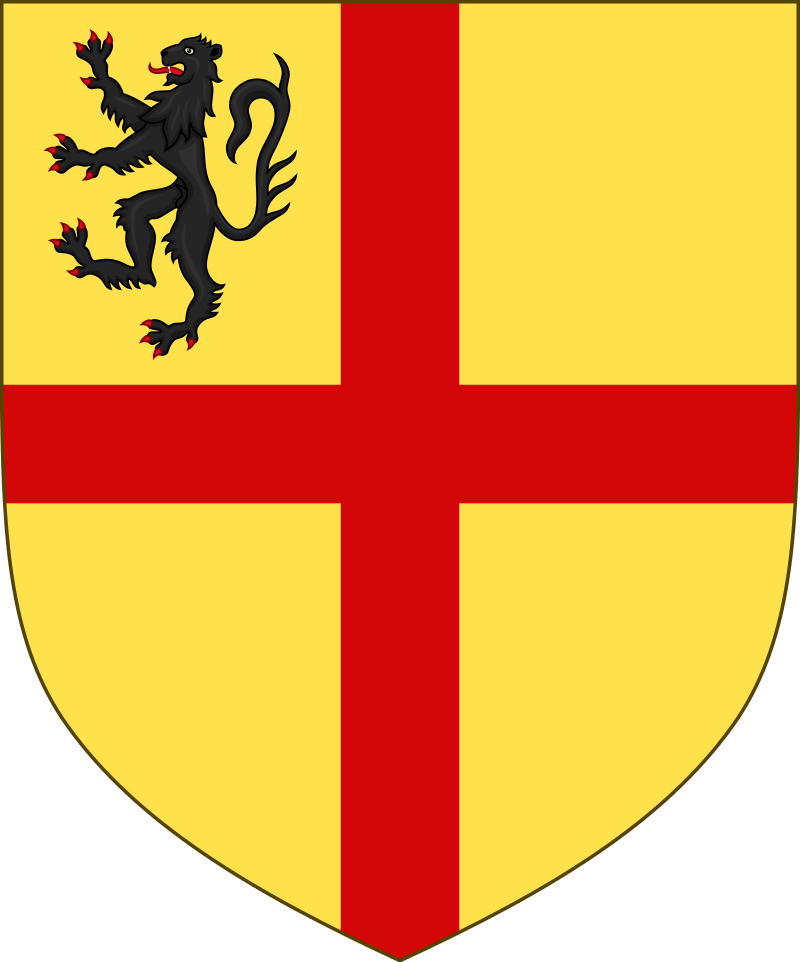
- Arms of de Burgh/Burke of Clanricarde.
- Native name: Uilleag Fionn de Búrca
- Born: Galway, Ireland
- Died: 1509
- Noble family: House of Burgh

Ulick Fionn Burke, 6th Clanricarde or Mac William Uachtar (English: /ˈjuːlɪk ... klænˈrɪkɑːrd/ YOO-lik ... klan-RIK-ard; died 1509) was an Irish chieftain and noble.

== Family background ==
Ulick succeeded his father, Ulick Ruadh Burke, 5th Clanricarde (d.1485), as chieftain. The Annals of the Four Masters record Ulick's accession in 1485:

Ulick Burke, Lord of Clanrickard, heir of the Earl of Ulster, a general patron of the learned of Ireland, died; and his son, another Ulick, took his place. An army was led by this son into Machaire-Chonnacht, and into Hy-Many, and burned and destroyed corn and towns; and, among other things, he burned and demolished the castle of Tulsk, and the prison.

Burke was an especially aggressive warlord, and sought to impose his authority over not only his fellow Bourkes in north Connacht, but over the Ui Maine, the Síol Muireadaigh and the independent towns of Athenry and Galway. In 1486,

A numerous army was led by O'Donnell into Connaught, and another by Mac William of Clanrickard, to oppose him. On coming together, however, they agreed to conditions of peace and amity. Felim Finn O'Conor repaired to these armies, and gave himself up into the hands of O'Donnell, in behalf of his territories and chieftains. The peace of Sil-Murray was concluded on this occasion; and the son of Felim Finn was taken as a hostage, instead of Felim Finn himself, by O'Donnell, who took him with him into Tirconnell, by the advice of Mac William of Clanrickard.

The following year,

An army was led by Mac William of Clanrickard (Ulick, the son of Ulick of the Wine) into Hy-Many, by which he destroyed the bawn of Athliag Maenagan, and destroyed much corn and many towns throughout Hy-Many and Machaire-Chonnacht. Rossa, the son of Felim Finn, was slain by one shot of a dart by a man of this army. The sons of Felim Finn O'Conor (i.e. Hugh, Turlough, and Conor) passed by them to Baile-tobair-Bhrighde, which they burned and plundered. Dermot, the son of Donnell, son of Turlough Dall O'Conor, while pursuing them, was slain at Roscommon; but his people followed them into Clann-Conway, and took some horses from them. It was at the instance, of O'Conor Don (i.e. Hugh, the son of Hugh, son of Turlough Don) that this incursion was made. The Sil-Murray concluded a peace among themselves, after having refused to do so, by the advice of their friends.

== Marriage to Lady FitzGerald ==
Gearoid Mór Fitzgerald, 8th Earl of Kildare, in an attempt to restrain Burke's power, married him off to his daughter, Lady Estacia FitzGerald. However, there was only so much he could do against Burke on a local level. Neither could he prevent Burke from taking additional wives, including Slaine Ni Con Mara.

== Activities ==
From the Annals of the Four Masters:

- 1495 – Mac William of Clanrickard, i.e. Rickard Oge, came to Lower Connaught, and whatever O'Donnell had not destroyed was destroyed by him.
- 1498 – Slaine, the daughter of Mac Namara (Sida Cam), and wife of Mac William of Clanrickard (Ulick, the son of Ulick), died.
- 1500 – Mac William Burke was drawn to their assistance by O'Conor and the sons of William O'Kelly. The castle of Athleague was taken by him, and given up to the sons of William O'Kelly; and Conor O'Kelly, the second lord that was over Hy-Many, was taken prisoner in it, and delivered, together with the hostages of the subchiefs of Hy-Many, up to Melaghlin, the son of Teige, son of Donough, who assumed the full lordship of Hy-Many on that occasion. The castle of Tulsk was taken by Mac William and O'Conor; and the son of Carbry, son of Brian, was killed in it by a bullet-shot; and the hostages of the descendants of Felim, and their castles, were given to O'Conor. Mac William made peace between O'Conor and Mac Dermot; and each gave up hostages into the keeping of the other, namely, Owen, son of O'Conor, and Carbry, son of O'Conor.
- 1501 – Edmond, the son of Rickard Burke, was taken by Mac William of Clanrickard, on his return from the pilgrimage of St. James in Spain. A great ransom was exacted for him, and good hostages of his people, besides his son.

== Knockdoe ==
By the early 1500s, Burke's power had grown to the point where he was the pre-eminent lord in Connacht, viewed as a threat both by FitzGerald and Hugh Dubh O'Donnell, King of Tír Chonaill, who viewed north Connacht as one of his domains. To make matters worse, Burke entered into a successful alliance with Toirdhealbhach Donn Ó Brien, King of Thomond.

Early in 1503,

Mac William of Clanrickard gave a very great overthrow to O'Kelly and a party of the people of Conmaicne-Cuile, where the greater part of the gallowglasses of both the Clann-Donnell and Clann-Sweeny were slain around their constables, and where Walter, the son of John Burke, a distinguished captain, was also slain.

This was followed up with a successful encounter against the king of Ui Maine, at Bel Atha na nGarbhan:

The defeat of Bel-atha-na-ngarbhan was given by John Burke, the son of Ulick, son of Ulick, grandson of Rickard, Tanist of Clanrickard, to O'Kelly, in which fell Walter, the son of John, son of Thomas Burke, heir to the lordship of Conmaicne, and many others of the Clann-Donnell and Clann-Dowell, were slain.

Burke followed this by attacking, seizing and demolishing three of O Cellaigh's castles:

Three castles belonging to O'Kelly, viz. Garbh-dhoire, Muine-an-mheadha, and Gallach, were demolished by Mac William Burke (i.e. Ulick the Third). O'Kelly, i.e. Melaghlin, went to the Lord Justice to complain of the injury done him, the result of which was, defeat of Cnoc-Tuagh.

O Ceallaigh had a personal motive, in that his wife was in open adultery with Burke. FitzGerald had a similar motive, in that his daughter was being slighted by the affair, but, with Burke's capture of the independent towns of Athenry and Galway, the matter had become national and could no longer be ignored. FitzGerald assembled an alliance of Gaelic-Irish and Anglo-Irish lords, led by himself, to confront Burke. They included Ó Donnell of Tír Conaill, Ó Neill of Tír Eoghain, Ó Connor Roe, MacDermot of Moylurg, Bourke of north Connacht and many lords of The Pale.

Supporting Burke were Ó Brian and MacNamara of Thomond, Ó Carroll of Ely, Ó Kennedy of Ormond, Mac I Briens of Aran, plus several Gallowglass units. At the Battle of Knockdoe in August 1504, Burke was defeated.

== Later life ==
The Annals of the Four Masters record little of Burke's activities till recording his death in 1509. He was succeeded by his younger brother, Richard Óge Burke, 7th Clanricarde (d.1519). All but three of the subsequent Clanricardes and Earls of Clanricarde would be his descendants.

== Genealogy ==
  Ulick Ruadh Burke, d. 1485
   |
   |____________________________________________________________________________________________
   |                      |                        |                        |                 |
   |                      |                        |                        |                 |
   Edmund, d. 1486.   Ulick Fionn       Meiler, Abbot of Tuam John, d. 1508.  Richard Óge, d. 1519.
   |                      |                                                                   |
   |                      |_______________________________________________________            |_________________
   Ricard, d. c. 1517.    |                          |              |            |            |                |
   |                      |                          |              |            |            |                |
   |                   Ulick Óge, d. 1519.  Richard Mór Redmond Richard Bacach Ulick, d. 1551.        Thomas
   John, fl. 1536.                                   |                           |            |                |
                                                     |                           |            |                |
                                                Ulick na gCeann Roland, Bp. Clonfert. Thomas Balbh John of Derrymaclaghtna
                                                     |                         died 1580                       |
                          ___________________________|_____________________________                            |
                          |                    |     |               |             |                       Ricard, d. 1593.
                          |                    |     |               |             |                           |
                         Richard Sassanach John Thomas Feranta Edmond Redmond na Scuab (Burke of Derrymaclaghtna)
                          | d. 1582.                 d. 1546.                  d. 1596.
                          |
                      Earl of Clanricarde

Clanricarde (Mac William Uachtar) Genealogy
- Richard an Fhorbhair de Burgh (d.1343)
  - Sir William (Ulick) de Burgh (d. 1343/53), 1st Mac William Uachtar (Upper Mac William) or Clanricarde (Galway)
    - Richard Óg Burke (d. 1387), 2nd Clanricarde
      - Ulick an Fhiona Burke (d. 1424), 3rd Clanricarde
        - Ulick Ruadh Burke (d. 1485), 5th Clanricarde
          - Edmund Burke (d. 1466)
            - Ricard of Roscam (d. 1517)
              - John mac Richard Mór Burke (d. 1536), 10th Clanricarde
          - Ulick Fionn Burke (d.1509), 6th Clanricarde
            - Ulick Óge Burke (d. 1520), 8th Clanricarde
            - Richard Mór Burke (d. 1530), 9th Clanricarde
              - Ulick na gCeann Burke (d. 1544), 12th Clanricarde, 1st Earl of Clanricarde (1543)
            - Richard Bacach Burke (d. 1538), 11th Clanricarde
          - Richard Óge Burke (d. 1519), 7th Clanricarde
            - Sir Uilleag Burke (d. 1551), 13th Clanricarde
      - William mac Ulick Burke (d. 1430), 4th Clanricarde
    - Edmund de Burgh (d. 1410)

== Family ==
Ulick had several children:

- Ulick Óge Burke, 8th Clanricarde (d.1520)
- Richard Mór Burke, (d. 1530), 9th Clanricarde
- Richard Bacach Burke, 11th Clanricarde (d.1538)
- Thomas Bourke (d.1517)
- Catherine Bourke who married Daniel O'Ceallagh

== See also ==
- House of Burgh, an Anglo-Norman and Hiberno-Norman dynasty founded in 1193
- Earl of Clanricarde

Preceded by Ulick Ruadh Burke	Clanricarde; 1485–1509	Succeeded by Richard Óge Burke
