= Ulick Ruadh Burke =

Irish chieftain and noble (died 1485)

Ulick Ruadh Burke 5th Clanricarde
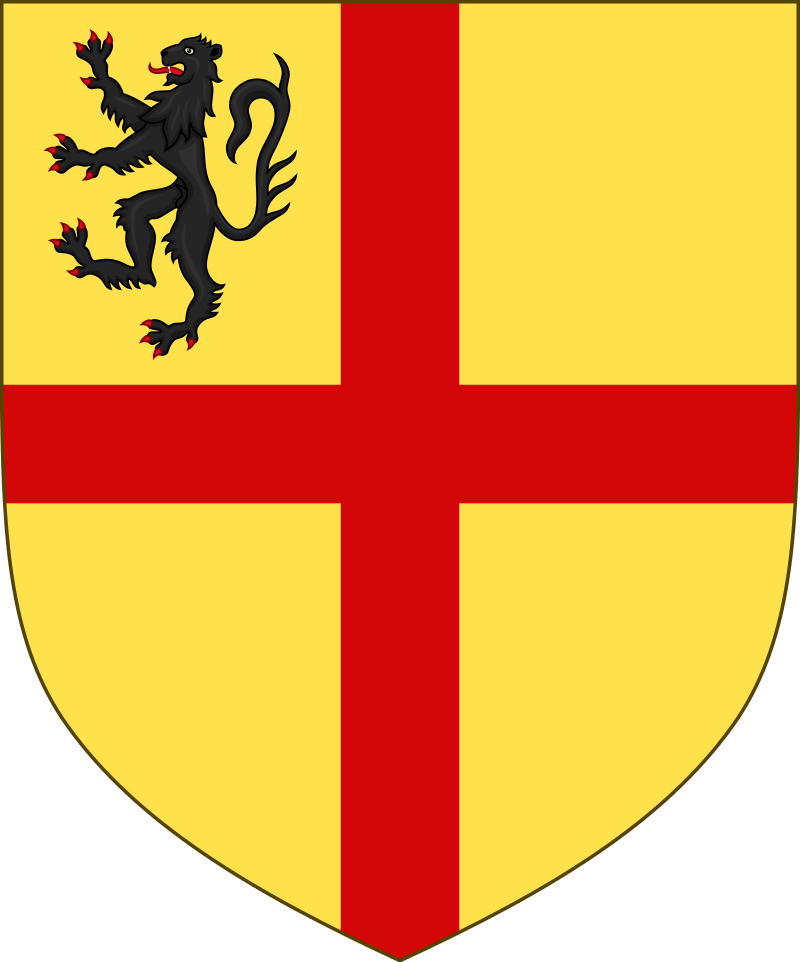
- Arms of de Burgh/Burke of Clanricarde.
- Native name: Uilleag Ruadh de Búrca
- Born: Galway, Ireland
- Died: 1485
- Noble family: House of Burgh
- Father: Ulick an Fhiona Burke

Ulick Ruadh Burke, 5th Clanricarde or Mac William Uachtar (English: /ˈjuːlɪk ... klænˈrɪkɑːrd/ YOO-lik ... klan-RIK-ard; died 1485) was an Irish chieftain and noble who was the son of Ulick an Fhiona Burke, 3rd Clanricarde (d.1424).

== Biography ==
Ulick succeeded his uncle, William mac Ulick Burke, 4th Clanricarde (d.1430), as chieftain in 1430. Ulick was succeeded by his son, Ulick Fionn Burke, 6th Clanricarde (d.1509).

== Family ==
Ulick married and had three children:

- Ulick Fionn Burke, 6th Clanricarde (d.1509)
- Richard Óge Burke, 7th Clanricarde (d.1519)
- Catherine Burke who became Queen of Thomond through her marriage to King Toirdhealbhach Bóg Ó Briain

According to the Annals of the Four Masters:

M1567.7. John Burke, son of John, who was son of John-na-bhfiacal, son of Ulick Roe, was killed by some peasants and spiteful labourers belonging to the Earl of Clanrickard.

1572.5. John; the son of Thomas, son of Richard Oge, son of Ulick Roe, son of Ulick of the Wine, was drowned in the River Suck.

== Annals of the Four Masters ==
From the Annals of the Four Masters

1452. More, daughter of O'Conor Faly, and wife of Mac William of Clanrickard. died of a fall.

1462. An army was led by Mac William of Clanrickard into Hy-Cairin, where O'Meagher, i.e. Teige, and his confederates, rose up to oppose him. The son of O'Meagher slew William Burke, the son of Mac William, by one cast of a javelin; and it was this cast that saved O'Meagher and his army. This O'Meagher, Chief of Hy-Cairin, died a short time afterwards, and his son assumed his place.

M1466.15. Rickard, the son of Mac William Burke, i.e. the son of Richard Oge, Tanist of Clanrickard, died.

M1467.19. O'Kelly and the sons of William Burke were defeated at CrosMoighe-Croin, by Mac William of Clanrickard, and by the O'Briens. William Caech Burke, the son of Mac William, two sons of O'Kelly, Hugh Boy, son of Turlough Mac Donnell, Constable of their Gallowglasses, and ten of the gentlemen of the Clann-Donnell who were along with him, were slain in the conflict. One hundred and sixty gallowglasses, and numbers of others, were also slain. O'Donnell i.e. Hugh Roe, son of Niall Garv, went to Connaught, to take revenge for this defeat, for Mac William and O'Kelly were his friends and confederates. He forced the Clanrickards to make peace, and then returned home in safety.

M1468.3. O'Rourke, Tiernan Oge, the son of Teige, worthy Lord of the Hy-Briuin, and of all the race of Aedhe-Finn, died, after having overcome the world and the Devil; and Donnell, the son of Teige O'Rourke, was elected in his place by O'Donnell and his other friends. But the descendants of Tiernan, the son of Tiernan More, son of Ualgarg, unjustly rose up against him Donnell, the son of Tiernan More; and they themselves, and the people of Carbury, and the Clann-Donough, inaugurated Donough Losc, the son of Tiernan More. O'Donnell, when he had heard of this, crossed the Erne with a numerous army, and destroyed Lower Connaught. He seized on great spoils in the east of Tir-Fiachrach of Cuil-Cnamha and Coillte-Luighne, which spoils he afterwards carried home. Mac William Oughter, i.e. Ulick, son of Ulick-an-Fhiona, and O'Conor Don, with the English and Irish forces of both, marched to the relief of Lower Connaught; and they burned the town of O'Rourke. But this was all the good they did; and they returned home without battle or booty.

M1469.19. A great army was mustered by O'Donnell (Hugh Roe), with the chiefs of Tirconnell, joined by the rising out of Lower Connaught, and marched, without halting, until he reached Mac William Burke i.e. Richard, the son of Edmond, who came with submission to O'Donnell. These chieftains afterwards held a consultation, and resolved on marching against Mac William of Clanrickard (Ulick, son of Ulick-an-Fhiona), to wreak their vengeance on him for the defeat of Cros-Moighe-Croinn, which Mac William of Clanrickard had some time before given to Mac William Burke; and being unanimous on this resolution, they proceeded into Clanrickard. Machaire-Riabhach was the first place burned and destroyed by them. They were for a night encamped at Baile-an-Chlair, the town of Mac William, which they afterwards burned; and they continued for some time destroying and laying waste the country on every side. Mac William (i.e. Ulick), however, drew and gathered to his assistance the sons of O'Brien, i.e. Gilla-Duv, the son of Teige, and Murtough Garv, the son of Teige, and a body of the Dalcassian chieftains along with them. Mac William, with his own troops and muster, came up with O'Donnell as he was leaving the country; and Mac William's cavalry and the O'Briens made the first charge on the rear of O'Donnell's army, at Baile-an-Duibh. This was vigorously responded to by O'Donnell's cavalry, and in particular by Egneghan, the son of Naghtan O'Donnell, who was in the rear of O'Donnell's army, so that the cavalry of Mac William and of the O'Briens were finally defeated; and Donnell, the son of O'Conor of Corcomroe, and many others not enumerated, were slain on the occasion. Mac William and the O'Briens, however, rallied their forces, and, placing themselves in array and order, they pursued with one accord the army of O'Donnell. This, however, was of no profit to them, for O'Donnell's army wheeled round on Mac William's and the O'Briens' cavalry at the river which is called Glanog, and there routed them again; and the defeated left many men, horses, and things of value, behind them, and fled in an inglorious retreat This was called The Defeat of Glanog.

M1475.16. The castle of Caladh was taken by Mac William of Clanrickard, and delivered up to the son of Melaghlin O'Kelly, who was the son of his Mac William's own daughter.

M1485.4. Ulick Burke, 5th Lord of Clanrickard, heir of the Earl of Ulster, a general patron of the learned of Ireland, died; and his son, another Ulick, took his place. An army was led by this son into Machaire-Chonnacht, and into Hy-Many, and burned and destroyed corn and towns; and, among other things, he burned and demolished the castle of Tulsk, and the prison.

== Genealogy ==
  Ulick Ruadh Burke, d. 1485
   |
   |____________________________________________________________________________________________
   |                      |                        |                        |                 |
   |                      |                        |                        |                 |
   Edmund, d. 1486.   Ulick Fionn Meiler, Abbot of Tuam John, d. 1508.  Richard Óge, d. 1519.
   |                      |                                                                   |
   |                      |_______________________________________________________            |_________________
   Ricard, d. c. 1517.    |                          |              |            |            |                |
   |                      |                          |              |            |            |                |
   |                   Ulick Óge, d. 1519.  Richard Mór Redmond Richard Bacach Ulick, d. 1551.        Thomas
   John, fl. 1536.                                   |                           |            |                |
                                                     |                           |            |                |
                                                Ulick na gCeann Roland, Bp. Clonfert. Thomas Balbh John of Derrymaclaghtna
                                                     |                         died 1580                       |
                          ___________________________|_____________________________                            |
                          |                    |     |               |             |                       Ricard, d. 1593.
                          |                    |     |               |             |                           |
                         Richard Sassanach John Thomas Feranta Edmond Redmond na Scuab (Burke of Derrymaclaghtna)
                          | d. 1582.                 d. 1546.                  d. 1596.
                          |
                      Earl of Clanricarde

Clanricarde (Mac William Uachtar) Genealogy
- Richard an Fhorbhair de Burgh (d.1343)
  - Sir William (Ulick) de Burgh (d. 1343/53), 1st Mac William Uachtar (Upper Mac William) or Clanricarde (Galway)
    - Richard Óg Burke (d. 1387), 2nd Clanricarde
      - Ulick an Fhiona Burke (d. 1424), 3rd Clanricarde
        - Ulick Ruadh Burke (d. 1485), 5th Clanricarde
          - Edmund Burke (d. 1466)
            - Ricard of Roscam (d. 1517)
              - John mac Richard Mór Burke (d. 1536), 10th Clanricarde
          - Ulick Fionn Burke (d.1509), 6th Clanricarde
            - Ulick Óge Burke (d. 1520), 8th Clanricarde
            - Richard Mór Burke (d. 1530), 9th Clanricarde
              - Ulick na gCeann Burke (d. 1544), 12th Clanricarde, 1st Earl of Clanricarde (1543)
            - Richard Bacach Burke (d. 1538), 11th Clanricarde
          - Richard Óge Burke (d. 1519), 7th Clanricarde
            - Sir Uilleag Burke (d. 1551), 13th Clanricarde
      - William mac Ulick Burke (d. 1430), 4th Clanricarde
    - Edmund de Burgh (d. 1410)

== See also ==
- House of Burgh, an Anglo-Norman and Hiberno-Norman dynasty founded in 1193

Preceded by William mac Ulick Burke	Clanricarde; 1430–1485	Succeeded by Ulick Fionn Burke
