= Ulick an Fhiona Burke =

Irish chieftain, noble and 3rd Clanricarde or Mac William Uachtar (died 1424)

Ulick an Fhiona Burke 3rd Clanricarde
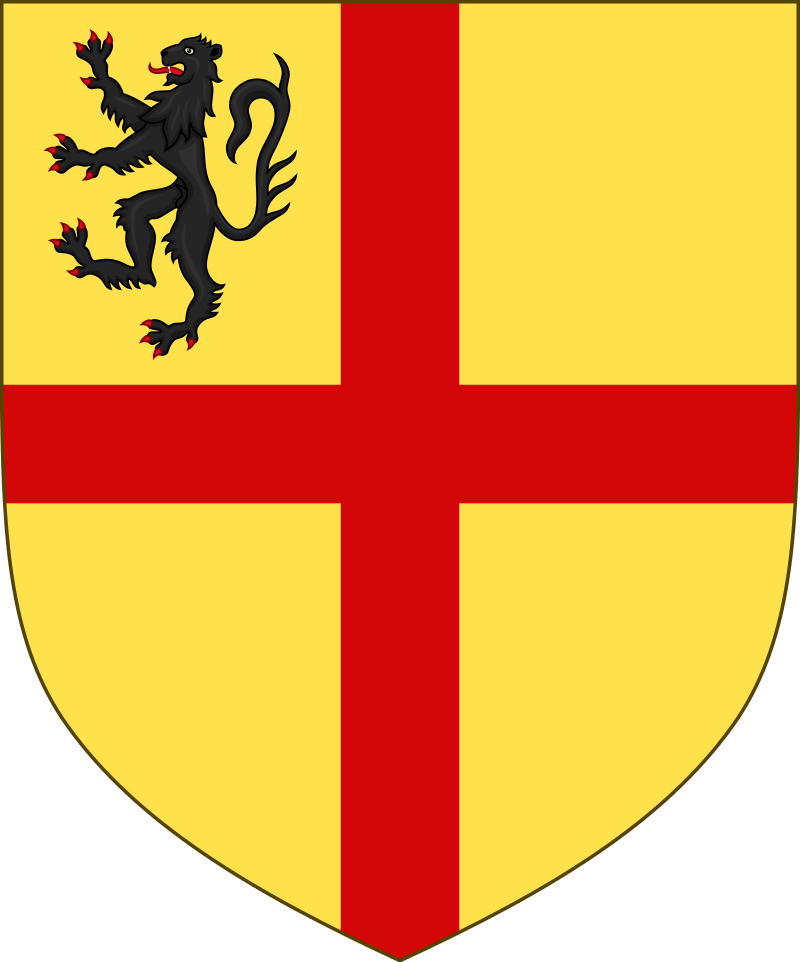
- Arms of de Burgh/Burke of Clanricarde.
- Native name: Uilleag an Fhiona de Búrca
- Born: Galway, Ireland
- Died: 1424
- Noble family: House of Burgh

Ulick an Fhiona Burke, 3rd Clanricarde or Mac William Uachtar (English: /ˈjuːlɪk ... klænˈrɪkɑːrd/ YOO-lik ... klan-RIK-ard; died 1424) was an Irish chieftain and noble who was nicknamed an Fhiona (meaning of the wine).

== Biography ==
Ulick became chieftain on the death of this father, Richard Óg Burke, 2nd Clanricarde (d.1387). Ulick died in 1424, and was succeeded by his brother, William mac Ulick Burke, 4th Clanricarde (d.1430). On the latter's death, Ulick's son, Ulick Ruadh Burke (d.1485), became the 5th Clanricarde.

== Annals of the Four Masters ==
From the Annals of the Four Masters:

1387. Richard Oge, i.e. the Mac William of Clanrickard, died.

1401. Melaghlin O' Kelly, Lord of Hy-Many, a truly hospitable and humane man, and Thomas, the son of Sir Edmond Albanagh Burke, i.e. Mac William, Lord of the English of Connaught, died, after the victory of penance. After the death of this Thomas Burke, two Mac Williams were made, namely, Ulick, the son of Richard Oge, who was elected the Mac William; and Walter, the son of Thomas, who was made another Mac William, but yielded submission to Mac William of Clanrickard for his seniority.

1403. An army was led by O'Conor Don and Murtough Bacagh, the son of Donnell (Lord of Sligo), into Upper Connaught, by which they acquired dominion over Sil-Anmchadha. They afterwards proceeded to Clanrickard, to assist Ulick, the son of Richard Burke, against the Hy-Many; No peace was made here.

1404. Cormac Mac Dermot was slain upon an incursion into Clanrickard, in a conflict with the cavalry of Clanrickard and Thomond.

1407. The battle of Cill achaidh was gained by O'Conor Roe, the sons of Melaghlin O'Kelly, and Mac Dermot, against Mac William of Clanrickard, and Cathal, the son of Rory O'Conor (who, after the killing of O'Conor Don, received the name of King of Connaught). Cathal O'Conor, William Burke, Redmond Mac Hubert, and O'Heyne, were taken prisoners, after the loss of many persons on both sides. Among the slain were Randal, the son of Donnell Oge Mac Donnell, and John Ballagh, son of Mac Henry. Many horses and coats of mail were left behind them after this defeat.

1409. The leg of Richard Burke was broken by a greyhound that rushed against him, while running at full speed; and he died in consequence.

1424. Mac William of Clannrickard (Ulick Burke) died in his own house, after having vanquished the Devil and the world.

== Family ==
Ulick married and had a son:

- Ulick Ruadh Burke, 5th Clanricarde (d. 1485)

== Genealogy ==
Clanricarde (Mac William Uachtar) Genealogy
- Richard an Fhorbhair de Burgh (d.1343)
  - Sir William (Ulick) de Burgh (d. 1343/53), 1st Mac William Uachtar (Upper Mac William) or Clanricarde (Galway)
    - Richard Óg Burke (d. 1387), 2nd Clanricarde
      - Ulick an Fhiona Burke (d. 1424), 3rd Clanricarde
        - Ulick Ruadh Burke (d. 1485), 5th Clanricarde
          - Edmund Burke (d. 1466)
            - Ricard of Roscam (d. 1517)
              - John mac Richard Mór Burke (d. 1536), 10th Clanricarde
          - Ulick Fionn Burke (d.1509), 6th Clanricarde
            - Ulick Óge Burke (d. 1520), 8th Clanricarde
            - Richard Mór Burke (d. 1530), 9th Clanricarde
              - Ulick na gCeann Burke (d. 1544), 12th Clanricarde, 1st Earl of Clanricarde (1543)
            - Richard Bacach Burke (d. 1538), 11th Clanricarde
          - Richard Óge Burke (d. 1519), 7th Clanricarde
            - Sir Uilleag Burke (d. 1551), 13th Clanricarde
      - William mac Ulick Burke (d. 1430), 4th Clanricarde
    - Edmund de Burgh (d. 1410)

== See also ==
- House of Burgh, an Anglo-Norman and Hiberno-Norman dynasty founded in 1193

Preceded by Richard Óg Burke	Clanricarde; 1387–1424	Succeeded by William mac Ulick Burke
