= Ulick na gCeann Burke, 1st Earl of Clanricarde =

Irish chieftain, noble and 12th Clanricarde or Mac William Uachtar (died 1544)

The Earl of Clanricarde
- Uilleag de Búrca

Member of the Irish House of Lords
- Hereditary Peerage; 1 July 1543 – March 1544
- Preceded by: New Creation (Clanricarde)
- Succeeded by: Richard Sassanach Burke

Personal details
- Born: Ulick Burke
- Died: 1544
- Spouses: Grany / Grace O'Carroll (divorced); Honora de Burgh (divorced); Maire Lynch (before 1544)
- Children: 4, including Richard Sassanach Burke
- Parent: Richard Mór Burke

Ulick na gCeann Burke, 12th Clanricarde or Mac William Uachtar, 1st Earl of Clanricarde (English: /ˈjuːlɪk ... klænˈrɪkɑːrd/ YOO-lik ... klan-RIK-ard; died 1544; styled MacWilliam, and na-gCeann, meaning "of the Heads", "having made a mount of the heads of men slain in battle which he covered up with earth") was an Irish noble and son of Richard Mór Burke, 9th Clanricarde (d. 1530) by a daughter of Madden of Portumna.

== Biography ==
Ulick succeeded his father to the headship of his clan, and held estates in County Galway. In March 1541 he wrote to Henry VIII, lamenting the degeneracy of his family, which had rebelled against England in the mid-14th century, and "which have been brought to Irish and disobedient rule by reason of marriage and nurseing [sic] with those Irish, sometime rebels, near adjoining to me", and placing himself and his estates in the king's hands. The same year he was present at Dublin, when an act was passed making Henry VIII King of Ireland.

In 1543, in company with other Irish chiefs, he visited the King at Greenwich and made full submission in accordance with the King's policy of "surrender and regrant". He was confirmed in the captainship and rule of Clanricarde, and on 1 July 1543, he was created Earl of Clanricarde and Baron of Dunkellin in the peerage of Ireland. He was regranted the greater part of his former estates, with the addition of other lands. The grant of the English titles was conditional upon the abandonment of native titles, the adoption of English customs and laws, the pledging of allegiance to the English crown, apostasy from the Roman Catholic Church, and conversion to the Anglican Church. In his review of the state of Ireland in 1553, Lord Chancellor Cusake stated "[t]he making of McWilliam earl of Clanricarde made all the country during his time quiet and obedient."

He did not live long to enjoy his new English dignities, but died shortly after returning to Ireland in about March 1544. He is called by the annalist of Loch Cé "a haughty and proud lord," who reduced many under his yoke, and by the Four Masters "the most illustrious of the English in Connaught".

== Marriages and family ==
Burke married three times. Firstly, he was married to Grany or Grace, daughter of Mulrone O'Carroll. This marriage was the only one declared valid and he eventually divorced her. They had a son:

- Richard, who eventually succeeded him as Second Earl of Clanricarde.

Secondly, he married Honora de Burgh, sister of Ulick de Burgh. He later divorced her as well.

Thirdly, he married Maire Lynch. They had a son:

- John Burke, who claimed the earldom in 1568.

According to Burke's Peerage, he had several other sons, Thomas "the Athlete" Burke (shot in 1545), Redmond "of the Broom" Burke (died 1595), and Edmund Burke (died 1597).

== Legacy ==
As a result of his marriages and relationships, there were a number of candidates contending for the titles of Clanricarde and Earl. The eventual successor was Ulick's eldest legitimate son, Richard Sassanach Burke, 2nd Earl of Clanricarde.

== Genealogy ==
Clanricarde (Mac William Uachtar) Genealogy
- Richard an Fhorbhair de Burgh (d.1343)
  - Sir William (Ulick) de Burgh (d. 1343/53), 1st Mac William Uachtar (Upper Mac William) or Clanricarde (Galway)
    - Richard Óg Burke (d. 1387), 2nd Clanricarde
      - Ulick an Fhiona Burke (d. 1424), 3rd Clanricarde
        - Ulick Ruadh Burke (d. 1485), 5th Clanricarde
          - Edmund Burke (d. 1466)
            - Ricard of Roscam (d. 1517)
              - John mac Richard Mór Burke (d. 1536), 10th Clanricarde
          - Ulick Fionn Burke (d.1509), 6th Clanricarde
            - Ulick Óge Burke (d. 1520), 8th Clanricarde
            - Richard Mór Burke (d. 1530), 9th Clanricarde
              - Ulick na gCeann Burke (d. 1544), 12th Clanricarde, 1st Earl of Clanricarde (1543)
            - Richard Bacach Burke (d. 1538), 11th Clanricarde
          - Richard Óge Burke (d. 1519), 7th Clanricarde
            - Sir Uilleag Burke (d. 1551), 13th Clanricarde
      - William mac Ulick Burke (d. 1430), 4th Clanricarde
    - Edmund de Burgh (d. 1410)

== Arms ==
Coat of arms of Ulick na gCeann Burke, 1st Earl of Clanricarde
Crest A Cat-a-Mountain sejant guardant proper, collared and chained Or. Escutcheon Or, a cross gules in the first quarter a lion rampant sable. Supporters Two Cats-a-Mountain sejant guardant proper, collared and chained Or. Motto UNG ROY, UNG FOY, UNG LOY (One king, one faith, one law)

== Ancestry ==
Ancestors of Ulick na gCeann Burke, 1st Earl of Clanricarde

8. Ulick Ruadh Burke, 5th Clanricarde
4. Ulick Fionn Burke, 6th Clanricarde
9.
2. Richard Mór Burke, 9th Clanricarde
10.
5. Slaine Ni Con Mara (Slany MacNamara)
11.
1. Ulick na gCeann Burke, 1st Earl of Clanricarde
12.
6.
13.
3. Margaret Butler
14.
7.
15.

== See also ==
- House of Burgh, an Anglo-Norman and Hiberno-Norman dynasty founded in 1193
- Ireland 1536–1691
- Surrender and regrant

Preceded by Richard Bacach Burke	Clanricarde; 1538–1543	Succeeded by Richard Sassanach Burke
Peerage of Ireland
New creation	Earl of Clanricarde; 1543–1544	Succeeded by Richard Sassanach Burke
