= Thomas Burgh, 3rd Baron Burgh =

English noble (c.1558–1597)

Sir Thomas Burgh
- Baron Borough of Gainsborough; Baron Strabolgi; Baron Cobham of Sterborough
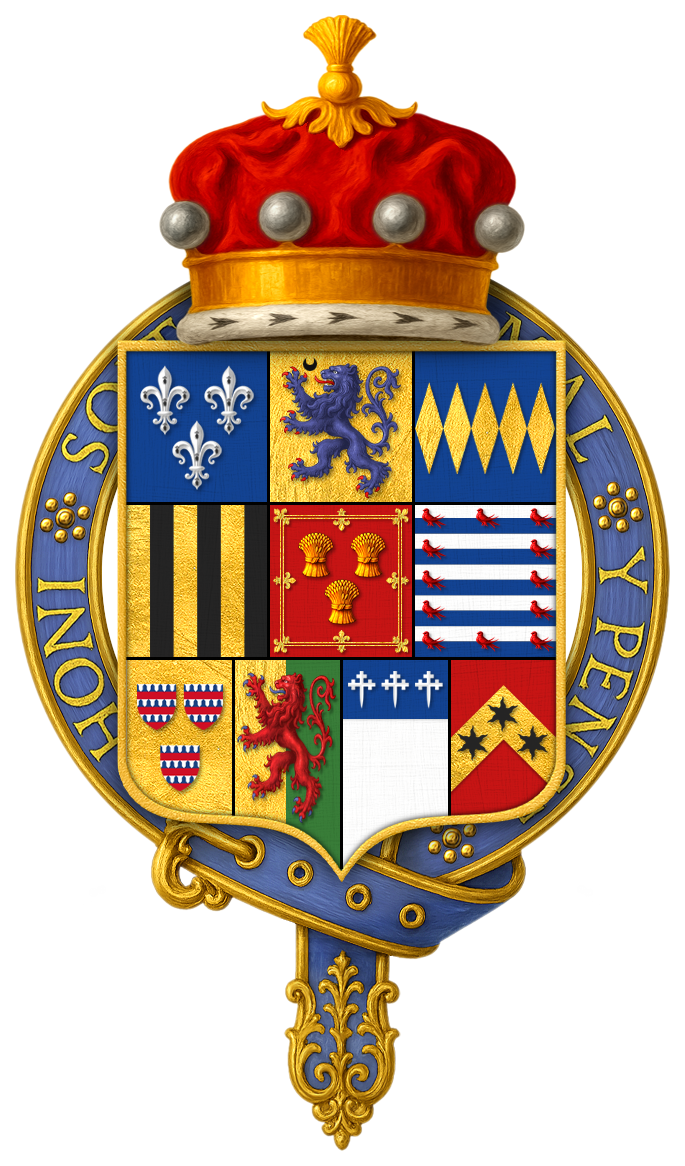
- Quartered arms of Sir Thomas Burgh, 3rd Baron Burgh, KG
- Born: c. 1558
- Died: 14 October 1597 (aged 38–39); Newry, County Down, Ireland
- Spouse: Frances Vaughan
- Issue: Robert Burgh, 4th Baron Burgh; Elizabeth Burgh; Anne Burgh; Frances Burgh; Katherine Burgh
- Father: William Burgh, 2nd Baron Burgh
- Mother: Lady Katherine Clinton

Thomas Burgh, 3rd Baron Burgh of Gainsborough, KG (/ˈbʌrə/ BURR-ə; c. 1558 – 14 October 1597), de jure 7th Baron Strabolgi and 9th Baron Cobham of Sterborough, was the son of William Burgh, 2nd Baron Burgh and Lady Katherine Clinton, daughter of Edward Clinton, 1st Earl of Lincoln and Elizabeth Blount, former mistress of King Henry VIII. He was one of the peers who conducted the trial of the Duke of Norfolk in 1572. (aged 14?)

Sir Thomas Burgh succeeded to the title of 3rd Lord Burgh [E., 1529] on 10 September 1584, by writ. He was invested as a Knight of the Garter on 23 April 1593.

In February 1593, he was appointed as English Ambassador to Scotland. Burgh was met by Lord Seton and banqueted at Seton Palace. James VI of Scotland was in the north and Burgh had to wait in Edinburgh until 14 March when he saw the king and discussed the risks of a Spanish invasion. On 18 March he had an audience with Anne of Denmark and received "ill grace both of words and looks". Burgh and the resident diplomat Robert Bowes borrowed £300 sterling from three Edinburgh merchants, Robert Jousie, Thomas Foulis, and John Porterfield in order to reward potential supporters of English policy.

On 18 April 1597, he was appointed Lord Deputy of Ireland but held the office only briefly, dying the same year.

Burgh married Frances Vaughan, the only daughter of John Vaughan of Sutton-on-Derwent, Yorkshire, by Anne Pickering (daughter and heiress of Sir Christopher Pickering by his wife Jane Lewknor, and widow of Sir Francis Weston and Sir Henry Knyvett), by whom he had a son and four daughters:

- Robert Burgh, 4th Baron Burgh (c.1594 – 26 February 1602), buried at Winchester Cathedral 19 March 1602.
- Elizabeth Burgh, married George Brooke, a younger son of William Brooke, 10th Baron Cobham, and had issue. She married secondly John Byrd of Broxton and had issue. She married thirdly Francis Reade, 2nd son of Sir William Reade, of Osterley, Middlesex. There were no issue of her third marriage.
- Anne Burgh (died after 1 June 1641), who married Sir Drew Drury on 11 October 1604.
- Frances Burgh (died before 24 Nov 1618), who married Francis Coppinger.
- Katherine Burgh (died April 1646), who married, on 28 February 1620, Thomas Knyvett, 5th Baron Berners, son of Sir Thomas Knyvett and Elizabeth Bacon (daughter and co-heiress of Nathaniel Bacon of Stiffkey) and had issue.

Burgh died at Newry, County Down, Ireland, on 14 October 1597.

In November 1613 his widow Frances, Lady Burgh, was given an allowance of £500 and went to join the household of Elizabeth Stuart, Queen of Bohemia at Heidelberg.

On the death of Burgh's son, Robert, his baronies of Burgh, Strabolgi, and Cobham of Sterborough fell into abeyance between his sisters. 314 years later, on 5 May 1916, the abeyance was terminated in favour of Alexander Henry Leith, 5th Baron Burgh (1866–1926).

== Ancestry ==
Ancestors of Thomas Burgh, 3rd Baron Burgh

16. Sir Thomas Burgh, 1st Baron Burgh
8. Edward Burgh, 2nd Baron Burgh
17. Margaret Ros
4. Thomas Burgh, 1st Baron Burgh
18. Thomas Cobham, 5th Baron Cobham
9. Anne Cobham
19. Lady Anne Stafford
2. William Burgh, 2nd Baron Burgh
20. Sir Robert Tyrwhit
10. Sir William Tyrwhit
21. Elizabeth Waterton
5. Agnes Tyrwhit
22. Sir Robert Constable of Flamborough
11. Anne Constable
23. Agnes Wentworth
1. Sir Thomas Burgh, 3rd Baron Burgh
24. John Clinton, 7th Baron Clinton
12. Thomas Clinton, 8th Baron Clinton
25. Elizabeth Morgan
6. Edward Clinton, 1st Earl of Lincoln
26. Sir Edward Poynings
13. Mary Poynings
3. Lady Katherine Clinton
28. Sir Thomas Blount of Kinlet
14. Sir John Blount
29. Anne Croft
7. Elizabeth Blount
30. Sir Hugh Pershall
15. Catherine Pershall
31. Isabel Stanley

== See also ==
- House of Burgh, an Anglo-Norman and Hiberno-Norman dynasty founded in 1193
- Hubert de Burgh, 1st Earl of Kent (c.1170–1243) English nobleman and ancestor of the Burghs of Gainsborough

Political offices
Preceded by William Russell	Lord Deputy of Ireland; 1597	Succeeded by Earl of Essex
Unknown	Ambassador to Scotland; 1594	Unknown
Unknown	Governor of Brill, Flanders; 1587–1597	Unknown
Peerage of England
Preceded by William Burgh	Baron Burgh; 1584–1597	Succeeded by Robert Burgh
Preceded by William Burgh	Baron Strabolgi; 1584–1597	Succeeded by Robert Burgh
Preceded by William Burgh	Baron Cobham of Sterborough; 1584–1597	Succeeded by Robert Burgh
