= Edward Burgh =

Edward Burgh or Borough may refer to:

- Edward Burgh (baron) (died 1528), English peer
- Edward Burgh (knight) (died 1533), 1st husband of Queen Catherine Parr
- Edward Borough of the Borough baronets

== See also ==
- Burgh (disambiguation)
