= Thomas Burgh, 1st Baron Burgh =

English peer, of Gainsborough, Lincolnshire (c.1488–1550)

Sir Thomas Burgh
- Baron Burgh of Gainsborough; Baron Strabolgi; Baron Cobham of Sterborough
- Born: c. 1488; Gainsborough, Lincolnshire, England
- Died: 28 February 1550 (aged 61–62)
- Buried: Gainsborough, Lincolnshire, England
- Spouses: Agnes Tyrwhitt; Alice London
- Issue: Sir Edward Burgh; Sir Thomas Burgh; William Burgh, 2nd Baron Burgh; Anne Burgh; Margaret Burgh; Agnes Burgh; Henry Burgh; Eleanor Burgh; Dorothy Burgh; Elizabeth Burgh; John Burgh; Richard Burgh
- Father: Edward Burgh, 2nd Baron Burgh
- Mother: Anne Cobham

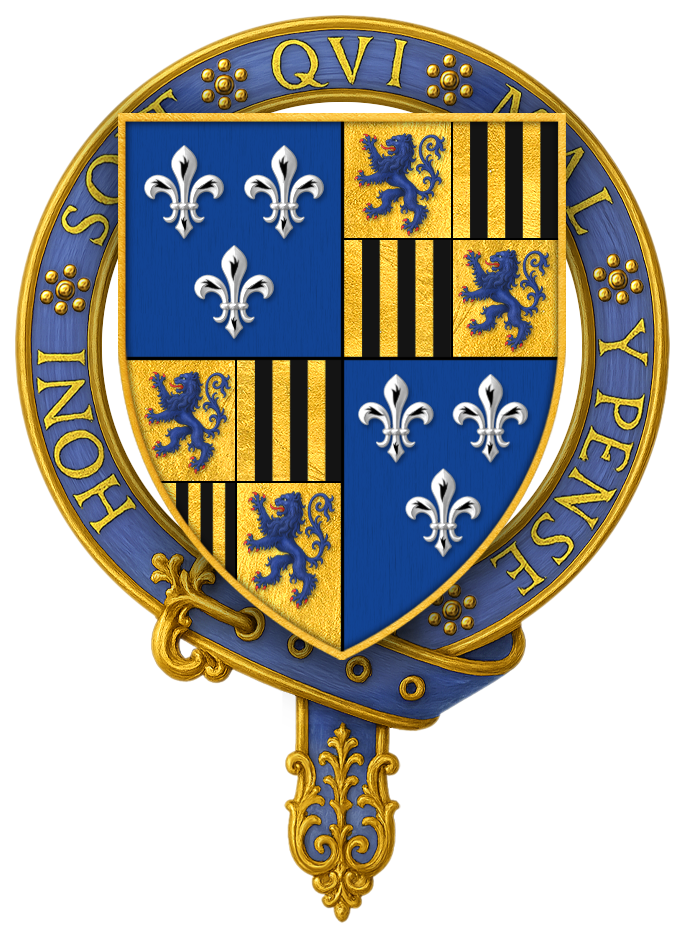
Arms of Sir Thomas Burgh, at the time of his installation as a knight of the Most Noble Order of the Garter

Thomas Burgh, 1st Baron Burgh of Gainsborough, KG (/ˈbʌrə/ BURR-ə; also spelt Borough; c. 1488 – 28 February 1550), de jure 5th Baron Strabolgi and 7th Baron Cobham of Sterborough, was an English peer. In 1513 he was knighted on Flodden Field, where he was one of the King's Spears, a bodyguard of King Henry VIII. He later became Lord Chamberlain to Anne Boleyn. He was also one of the twenty-six Peers summoned to the trial of Anne Boleyn in May 1536.

== Life ==
Thomas Burgh, also spelt "Borough", was born about 1488 at Gainsborough, Lincolnshire, the eldest son of Edward Burgh, 2nd Baron Burgh (c. 1463 – 1528) and Anne Cobham, suo jure 6th Baroness Cobham, daughter of Sir Thomas Cobham, de jure 5th Baron Cobham of Sterborough and Lady Anne Stafford, a daughter of the 1st Duke of Buckingham.

His father, Edward, succeeded as 2nd Baron of Gainsborough on 18 March 1495/96, but was never summoned to Parliament and the barony created for his grandfather in 1487 is considered to have become extinct on his death in 1496. However, after his father was found a lunatic in December 1529, Sir Thomas Burgh, was summoned to the House of Lords as Lord Burgh, of Gainsborough in the County of Lincoln. He had already succeeded his father as de jure fifth Baron Strabolgi and seventh Baron Cobham, an honour he inherited from his mother, although he was never summoned to Parliament in this title or confirmed in it. He was knighted in 1513 and served as High Sheriff of Lincolnshire in 1518 and 1524.

Sir Thomas's country seat was at Gainsborough Old Hall. He was an overbearing father, given to violent rages, who ruled with an iron hand, requiring absolute obedience. Some time after 1529, he had his daughter-in-law, Elizabeth Owen, thrown out of the household and her children with his younger son Thomas Burgh were declared bastards. Sir Thomas's own children lived in fear of their father.

Sir Thomas was opinionated on matters of religion and was a passionate supporter of the new reformed religion which was being introduced to England. Burgh had an ambitious reform-minded chaplain with whom he discussed his opinions on the matter of religion. When his chaplain went to London to find a new patron in Thomas Cromwell, Burgh wrote asking that he be returned immediately.

In May 1533, at the celebrations for the coronation of Anne Boleyn, Borough was severely rebuked for "ripping Queen Catherine of Aragon's [coat of] arms off her barge and for seizing the barge". Having been appointed as Boleyn's lord chamberlain, Borough maintained a high profile and rode in her barge as she was received at the Tower on her coronation day. Appearing in the procession he wore a surcoat and mantle of white cloth of tissue and ermine as he held the middle of Anne Boleyn's coronation train.

It was thought until recently that Thomas's father Edward Burgh, 2nd Baron Burgh, had married Catherine Parr in 1529, but the 2nd Baron died in August 1528. Through the recent research of contemporaneous documents, including the will of Catherine's mother, by the biographers Susan E. James, Linda Porter, David Starkey, and Alison Weir, it has been established that she married the 2nd Baron's grandson, who shared his grandfather's first name. Sir Edward Borough was the eldest son of Sir Thomas Borough. In the will of Maud Parr dated May 1529, she mentioned Sir Thomas, father of Edward, saying I am indebted to Sir Thomas Borough, knight, for the marriage of my daughter. At the time of his son's marriage, Thomas was thirty-five, which would have made Edward around Catherine's age. Sir Edward was in his twenties and may have been in poor health. He served as a feoffee for Thomas Kiddell and as a justice of the peace. According to Susan James and Linda Porter, Sir Edward Borough died in the spring of 1533, never holding the title of Lord Borough. Other sources state before April 1533.

== Marriage and issue ==
Burgh married twice; firstly in 1496, Agnes Tyrwhitt, a daughter of Sir William Tyrwhitt, with whom he had at least twelve children. He married secondly Alice London but had no further issue.

Burgh died in February 1550 and was succeeded in the barony by his third son, William. His second wife, Alice, died in 1559.

Issue by Agnes Tyrwhitt:

- Sir Edward Burgh (c. 1508 – before April 1533), eldest son and heir to Lord Borough, married Catherine Parr, without issue.
- Sir Thomas Burgh (d. 1542), who married Elizabeth Owen, and had issue. Elizabeth was thrown out by her father-in-law and their children were declared bastards by his father, Lord Borough. The barony was thus inherited by his younger brother, Sir William Burgh.
- William Burgh, 2nd Baron Burgh, de jure 6th Baron Strabolgi, (c. 1521 – 10 September 1584), married Lady Katherine Clinton, daughter of Edward Clinton, 1st Earl of Lincoln and Elizabeth Blount, a former mistress of King Henry VIII. They were the parents of Thomas Burgh, 3rd Baron Burgh.
- Henry Burgh (c. 1522 – 22 April 1557), from which the Burghs of Stow are descended.
- Anne Burgh (c. 1500–1582), married John Bussy of Hougham, Esq. who died in 1541. She married secondly, before 1550, Sir Anthony Neville.
- Margaret Burgh (d. 1552), married Robert Topcliffe of Somerby, Esq. (d. 1544).
- Agnes Burgh, married John Bassett of Fledborough, Esq.
- Eleanor Burgh, married firstly Sir William Musgrave, and secondly, as his second wife, Edmund Croftes (d. 14 February 1558) of Westow Hall in Little Saxham, Suffolk, son and heir of Sir John Croftes (d. 28 January 1558), by whom she had a son, John, and two daughters, Margaret and Alice.
- Dorothy Burgh, became a nun.
- Elizabeth Burgh, became a nun.
- John Burgh (living in 1550).
- Richard Burgh (living in 1550).

== Ancestry ==
Ancestors of Thomas Burgh, 1st Baron Burgh

16. Sir Hugh Burgh
8. Sir Thomas Burgh of Gainsborough
17. Elizabeth Bruce
4. Thomas Burgh of Gainsborough
18. Sir Thomas Percy of Northumberland
9. Elizabeth Percy
19. Elizabeth of Atholl Strathbogie
2. Edward Burgh, 2nd Baron Burgh
20. William de Ros, 6th Baron de Ros
10. Thomas de Ros, 8th Baron de Ros
21. Margaret Fitzalan
5. Margaret Ros
22. Richard de Beauchamp, 13th Earl of Warwick
11. Lady Eleanor Beauchamp
23. Elizabeth de Berkeley, Countess of Warwick
1. Sir Thomas Burgh, 1st Baron Burgh
24. Reginald Cobham, 2nd Baron Cobham
12. Reginald de Cobham, 3rd Baron Cobham
25. Eleanor Maltravers, 2nd Baroness Maltravers
6. Thomas Cobham, 5th Baron Cobham
26. Sir Thomas Culpepper of Bayhall
13. Eleanor Culpepper
27. Alianore Greene
3. Anne Cobham
28. Edmund Stafford, 5th Earl of Stafford
14. Humphrey Stafford, 1st Duke of Buckingham
29. Anne of Gloucester
7. Lady Anne Stafford
30. Ralph de Neville, 1st Earl of Westmorland
15. Anne Neville, Duchess of Buckingham
31. Lady Joan Beaufort, Countess of Westmorland

== See also ==
- House of Burgh, an Anglo-Norman and Hiberno-Norman dynasty founded in 1193
- Hubert de Burgh, 1st Earl of Kent (c.1170–1243) English nobleman and ancestor of the Burghs of Gainsborough

Peerage of England
Preceded by Edward Burgh	Baron Burgh; 1529–1550	Succeeded by William Burgh
Preceded by Edward Burgh	Baron Strabolgi; 1529–1550	Succeeded by William Burgh
Preceded by Anne Cobham	Baron Cobham of Sterborough; 1526–1550	Succeeded by William Burgh
