= Alford Windmill =

Windmill in Alford, Lincolnshire, England

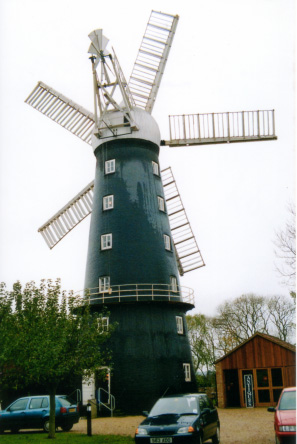
- Alford Windmill, October 2002
- Interactive map of Alford Windmill

Origin
- Mill location: Alford, Lincolnshire
- Coordinates: 53°15′56″N 0°11′02″E
- Operator: Lincolnshire County Council
- Year built: 1837

Information
- Purpose: Flour mill
- Type: Tower mill
- Storeys: Six storeys
- No. of sails: Five
- Type of sails: Patent sails
- Windshaft: Cast iron
- Winding: Fantail
- Fantail blades: Eight
- Auxiliary power: Gas engine
- No. of pairs of millstones: Four
- Other information

Listed Building – Grade I
- Designated: 20 May 1953
- Reference no.: 1146936
- Current Status: Privately owned

Alford Windmill, or Hoyles Mill is a five-sailed tower mill in Alford, Lincolnshire that was built in 1837 and worked commercially until 1955. It is the only surviving windmill out of four that once stood in the town. The mill is a Grade I listed building.

== History ==
Replacing a post mill, Hoyles Mill was built in 1837 by John Oxley, millwright of Alford. The ironwork was by the millwright William Tuxford of Boston. Part of the trestle of the post mill was incorporated into the new mill. In 1872, the charges for grinding at the mill were 90.00 per strike for wheat, with a toll of 8 pounds (3.6 kg) per strike or 30 pounds (14 kg) per 4 strikes. Barley, beans and oats were ground for 4 1/2d per strike, with a toll of 7 pounds (3.2 kg) per strike. Having been owned by a number of people through the years, the mill was rented in the late 19th century by Harry Hoyles. At some point, a gas engine was installed as auxiliary power. Hoyles was later to buy the mill. He ran the mill until his death in 1949. Hoyle's sons Arthur, Walter and Winton then ran the mill until 1955, when they closed the mill as they were unable to compete with large bakery firms and local farmers were grinding their own feed. The mill was listed on 20 May 1953.

The mill was bought in November 1957 by Charles Frederick L. Banks, a miller who owned Mount Pleasant Mill, Kirton in Lindsey. He planned to remove the sails and fit them to Mount Pleasant Mill, which was then being worked by engine. An appeal from the Society for the Protection of Ancient Buildings (SPAB) persuaded him to keep the sails, and put the mill back into working order. The work was carried out by R. Thompson & Son, millwrights of Alford. It was completed in spring 1958. Banks offered the mill for sale in December 1970, asking offers in excess of £6,000, but the mill did not sell. In 1973, Banks announced that the cap and sails needed replacing at a cost of £13,860. the Department of the Environment gave a 50% grant towards the cost. The mill later came into the ownership of Lincolnshire County Council. A new cap and sails were fitted to the mill by R. Thompson & Son in 1978. The mill's listing was upgraded to Grade I on 30 June 1986. The mill is the last survivor of four tower mills that stood in Alford. Until 1932, there was a four, five, and six-sailed windmill in Alford.

In July 2024, it was announced that the mill would be restored, with a planned re-opening in 2026. A new visitor's centre would be built. Ownership of the mill is due to be transferred from Lincolnshire County Council to Alford Town Council when the restoration is complete. In December, East Lindsey District Council pulled the funding, claiming that Lincolnshire County Council had no commitment to restore the mill. The Alford Windmill Trust described the news as "devastating". In March 2025, Lincolnshire County Council stated that they were still committed to the restoration of the mill. The Alford Windmill Trust disbanded in August 2025. As of April 2026, the mill was under restoration and closed to the public.

== Descriptiontion ==
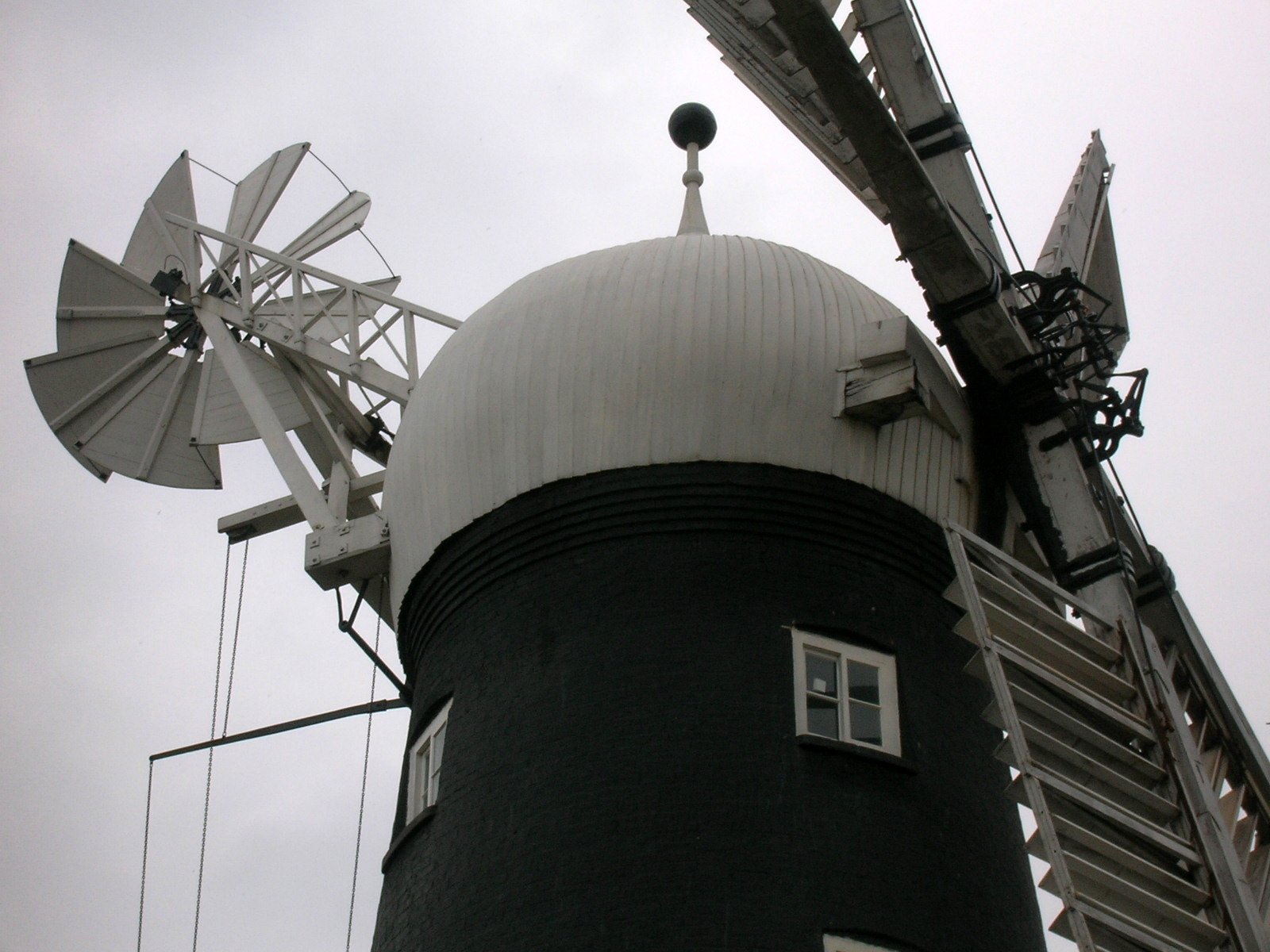
Close up of sails

Alford Windmill is a six-storey tower mill with a stage at second floor level. It has an ogee cap. Five single Patent sails are carried on a cast iron windshaft. The mill is winded by an eight-bladed fantail. The windshaft carries a wooden brake wheel of clasp arm construction. The brake wheel drives a cast iron wallower at the top of the cast iron upright shaft. The sack hoist is driven from the underside of the wallower. At the bottom of the upright shaft, a cast iron great spur wheel drives four pairs of millstones overdrift. Two pairs of stones are Peak stones and two are French Burr stones. The mill also drives a flour dresser. The mill could grind 4 to 5 tonnes of grain per day.
