= Edward Burgh (knight) =

English knight

Sir Edward Burgh
- Justice of the Peace
- Born: c. 1508
- Died: before April 1533 (aged 24-25); Gainsborough, Lincolnshire, England
- Buried: Gainsborough, Lincolnshire
- Noble family: Burke
- Spouse: Catherine Parr (m. 1529)
- Father: Thomas Burgh, 1st Baron Burgh
- Mother: Agnes Tyrwhitt

Sir Edward Burgh (pronounced "Borough"; died before April 1533) was the eldest son and heir to Sir Thomas Burgh, 1st Baron Burgh, and Agnes Tyrwhit. He is known for being the first husband of Catherine Parr, later queen of England. 18th-century historians have mistaken him for his grandfather, the elderly Edward Burgh, 2nd Baron Burgh.

== Background ==
The Boroughs of Gainsborough in Lincolnshire were an old and well-established gentry family. Sir Edward's great-grandfather, the 1st Baron had been an outstanding Yorkist in the reign of King Edward IV in the neighbourhood of fanatical Lancastrians. He was a tough-minded and hard-handed individual, who was awarded the Order of the Garter in 1496 by King Henry VII, proving his ability to change and adapt with the constant royal change. Sir Thomas' son, Sir Edward Borough, who, in 1496, became baron in name only, was not so fortunate. In 1510, only a few years after succeeding to the barony, Borough was declared a lunatic and was kept under restraint in his own home, Gainsborough Old Hall. After his incarceration, Sir Thomas, his eldest son, took over as head of the family. By August 1528, the 2nd Baron was dead.

For centuries, historians, such as Agnes Strickland, and antiquarians alike have confused the grandfather, Lord Borough, with the grandson, Sir Edward, throwing the Scrope-Parr marriage negotiations into the mix for good measure. The idea of twelve-year-old Catherine Parr being sent away to marry an aged lunatic was a wonderful story filled with drama – but nonetheless was a myth. Through recent research of documents and the will of Catherine Parr's mother, biographers Linda Porter, David Starkey, and Antonia Fraser all confirm that Catherine married the 2nd Baron's grandson, who coincidentally shared his first name.

As the dowry had not been fully paid, Maud Parr in her will, dated May 1529, mentioned Sir Thomas, father of Edward, saying "I am indebted to Sir Thomas Borough, knight, for the marriage of my daughter". At the time of his son's marriage, Sir Thomas, was thirty-five which would have made Edward around Catherine's age. When Edward and Catherine married in 1529, Sir Edward was in his early twenties and, although almost nothing is known about his character, it appears that his health kept him in a frail condition. Whatever the case, Edward was competent enough for his father to allow him the duties and responsibilities of part of his inheritance – he served as both a feoffee and a justice of peace.

Life at Gainsborough, was under an overbearing father given to violent rages, and the memories of the recently deceased lunatic were prevalent. Sir Edward's father ruled his family with an iron hand, requiring absolute obedience. Some time after his marriage to Catherine, his father had another daughter-in-law, Elizabeth Owen, thrown out of the household and her children with his younger brother, Thomas, declared bastards. Sir Edward lived in constant fear of his own father.

The duty of Sir Edward's wife, Catherine, was to bear sons, which did not happen. Failure to do so, however, may not have been all her fault. Having been raised in a liberal and enlightened household maintained by her mother, Edward Borough's new bride was unused to the paternal tyranny of the household at Gainsborough. If Sir Thomas attempted to intimidate his daughter-in-law, he did not succeed. In fact, Sir Thomas came to find that Catherine was made of sterner stuff than his own sons. The historical record on whether or not Catherine was ever pregnant by Edward is silent. If she was, certainly no child lived to full term or survived infancy. Although her immediate family would have known, they, along with Catherine, never spoke of it and there is no record of children by Sir Edward.

For a time, Edward and Catherine lived with Edward's family at Gainsborough Old Hall. If his wife was homesick or unhappy, she had reason to be and wrote frequently to her mother for advice. Maud Parr travelled north in 1530 to see Catherine, and it is most likely at her urging that the couple moved out of the Old Hall after two years of marriage. Sir Thomas was a steward to the manor of the soke of Kirton-in-Lindsey, a small town about ten miles above Gainsborough. Thomas was persuaded to secure a joint patent in survivorship with his son. In October 1530, Edward and Catherine moved to Kirton-in-Lindsey. It was a modest residence, but mainly it was away from Edward's family and was a household in which the couple could manage their own affairs. Instead of becoming the passive lady of the household, Edward's wife, Catherine, took control of the household immediately. It brought both Edward and Catherine great joy to be away from the Old Hall.

In 1532, Edward was named to the various commissions of peace that held session in the area, but by April 1533, Edward and Catherine's marriage came to an end when Edward Borough died. His widow, Catherine, unable to remain at Kirton-in Lindsey which belonged to her father-in-law, had limited options. Her in-laws showed no desire to have her move back into Gainsborough Old Hall. Lord Burgh turned over the income of two of his manors in Surrey and one in Kent as her dowry and that was the end of it. With no children from their marriage, she no longer had ties to the Boroughs.

Biographer Linda Porter has determined that the younger Sir Edward Burgh died in the spring of 1533. Others state before April 1533. Burgh had no issue. On 28 February 1550, Edward's father was succeeded by Edward's younger brother, William, 2nd Baron Burgh.
