= Linda Porter =

Linda Porter may refer to:

- Linda Porter (actress) (1933–2019), American character actress
- Linda Porter (historian) (born 1947), English historian and biographer
- Linda Lee Thomas (1883–1954), married name Linda Porter, wife of Cole Porter
