= Gainsborough Old Hall =

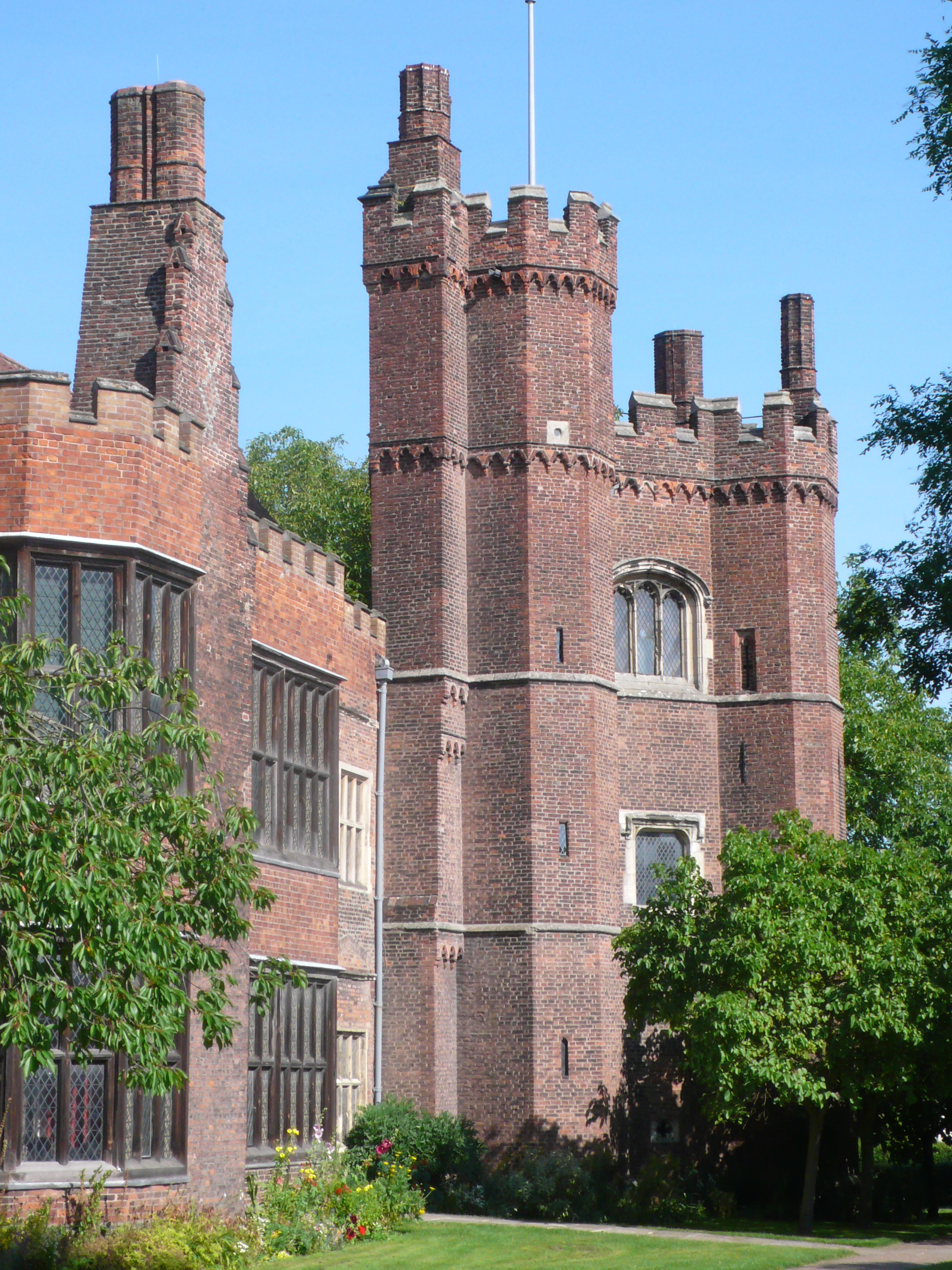
- Old Hall Tower

- Location within Lincolnshire
- 53.400657°N 0.777578°W
- OS grid reference: SK 81320 90012

History
- Built: 1471–1484

Site notes
- Architectural style: Tudor

Listed Building – Grade I
- Designated: 4 April 1964
- Reference no.: 1359773

Gainsborough Old Hall in Gainsborough, Lincolnshire is a five-hundred year old manor house and one of the best preserved medieval manor houses in England.

== History ==
=== Construction and royal visit by Richard III ===
The hall was built by Sir Thomas Burgh in 1460. The Burghs were rich, flamboyant and powerful. Gainsborough Old Hall was not only their home, but also a demonstration of their wealth and importance. Burgh was a benefactor to Newark Church and also the founder of the Chantry and Alms House at Gainsborough. In 1470, the manor was attacked by Sir Robert Welles over a clash about lands, status, and honour, but it was not severely damaged. In 1484 Thomas entertained King Richard III in his hall. Henry VII intended to raise Thomas to the pre-eminence of a Barony, but no second writ was issued, nor was a patent.

=== Incarceration of Edward Burgh ===
In 1510, Thomas Burgh's son, Edward Burgh, 2nd Baron Burgh, was incarcerated at the Old Hall after being declared a lunatic, never having attended the House of Lords. He died in 1528, leaving his eldest son Sir Thomas as head of the family. He was regarded as 1st Baron Burgh, de jure 3rd.

=== Royal visits by Henry VIII and role in Catherine Howard's execution ===
Henry VIII visited Gainsborough twice: once in 1509, and again in 1541 with his fifth wife, Queen Katherine Howard. The Queen was accused of indiscretions both at Gainsborough and Lincoln, and she was later executed. Katherine Parr, by this time widowed twice (Edward Burgh having died in 1533), became Henry's sixth wife.

=== Location of English Dissenters ===
When Thomas, the fifth Lord Burgh, died without an heir, the Hall was sold in 1596 to William Hickman, a merchant from London, who made many improvements, especially to the east wing. William and his mother Rose supported the Puritan Dissenters, and allowed John Smyth, Thomas Helwys and other excommunicated Puritans to worship and conduct services in the hall in early 17th century, until they sailed to the Netherlands in exile due to persecution and founded the Baptist tradition. The Hickman family continued to play a prominent role in the development of Gainsborough, and many became local members of Parliament. Sir Neville Hickman invited John Wesley to preach in the Great Hall several times in 1759, and in 1761 and 1764.

=== Unoccupied building ===
In 1720 a new house was built at Thonock on the edge of the town and the Old Hall became unoccupied. It remained in the family and was used for a variety of purposes.

== Architectural elements ==
Architecturally, the Old Hall has changed very little over the years. It is principally a timber framed building, giving a characteristic 'striped' or 'black and white' appearance. On the north-east corner is a brick tower. A splendid view of the town is available after a fifty-nine-step climb to the top.

Today, the Hall with its elaborate timber roof survives, with a kitchen which is possibly the most complete medieval kitchen in England. The kitchen still contains many original features, including two open fireplaces, each large enough to roast an ox, and two bread ovens served by a third chimney.

=== Witches' marks ===
The Hall contains a great number of "witches' marks", thought to prevent against evil, and curses carved into its walls. These include an unusual 'curse' in the form of an inverted carving of William Hickman's name. There are also many burn marks, to protect against fire.

== Reputed haunting by the Grey Lady ==
The tower of the Old Hall is supposedly haunted by the Grey Lady, thought to be the daughter of the Lord of the Manor, who fell in love with a poor soldier and planned to elope with him. Her father discovered the plan and locked her away in the tower, where she died from a broken heart. According to local legend, the girl's spirit still wanders the tower, endlessly waiting for her lover to arrive.

== Ownership by the state and status as a listed building ==
The house was looked after from 1949 by a volunteer group, The Friends of the Old Hall (FOHA), who saved the building and first opened it to the public. Sir Edmund Bacon gave it to the nation in 1970. The house is now owned by English Heritage and is open to the public as a museum. It is listed as Grade I for Heritage Protection. The Friends organisation still exists, and provides volunteer guides and other expertise.

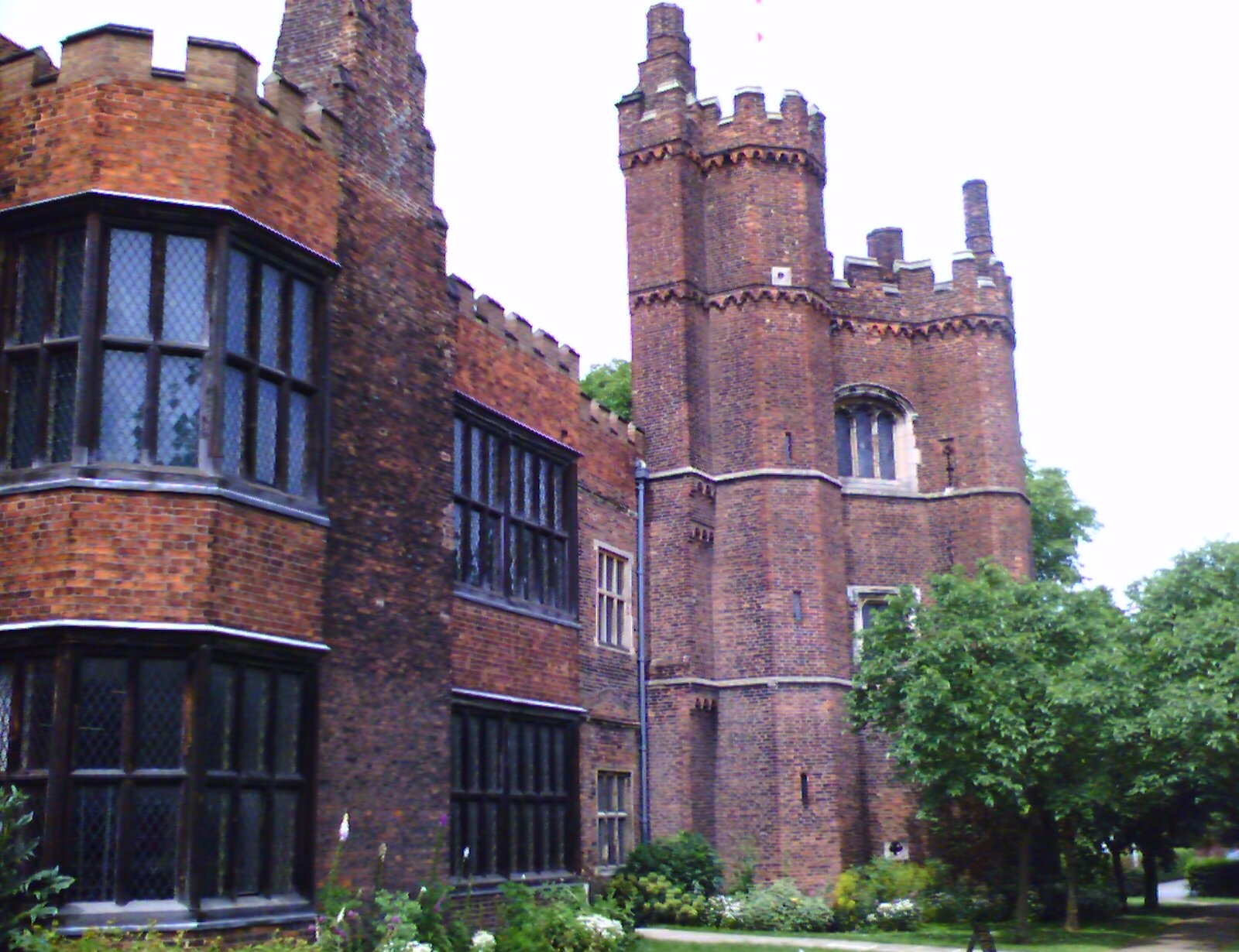
Gainsborough Old Hall tower

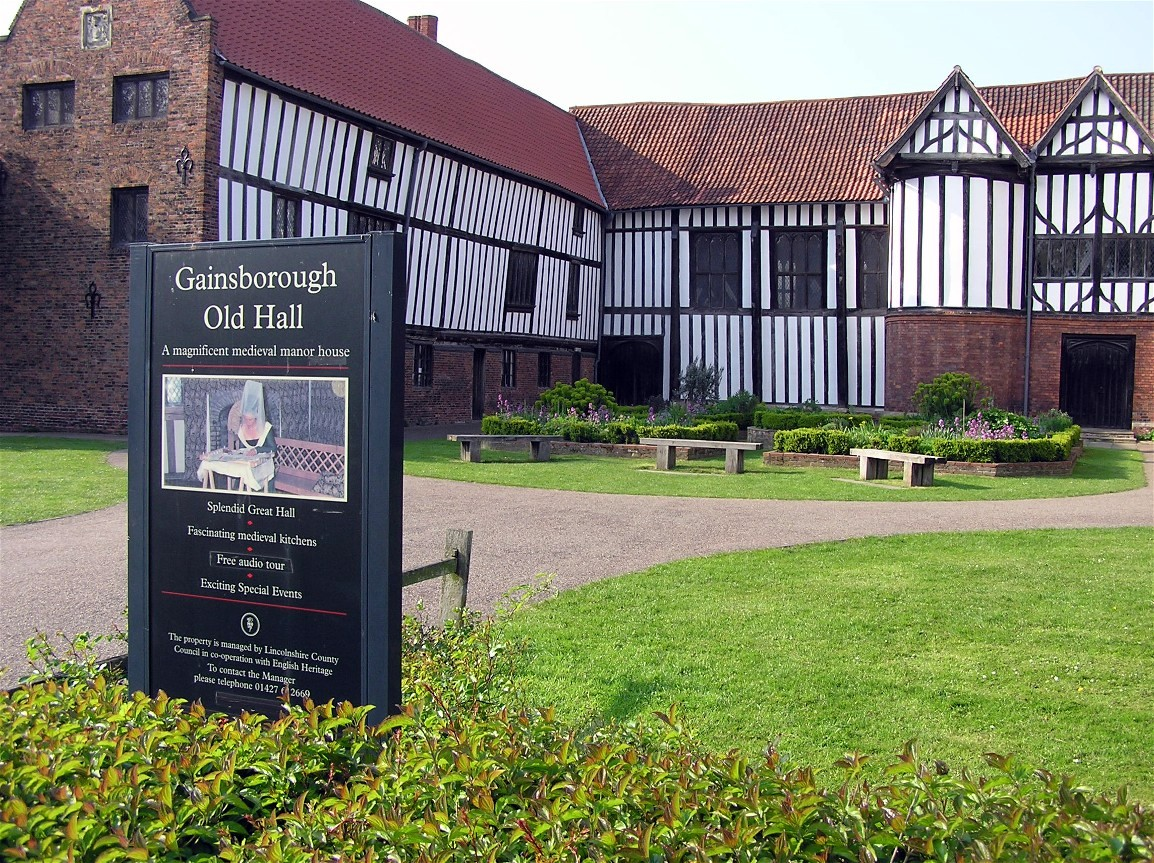
the west wing and great hall

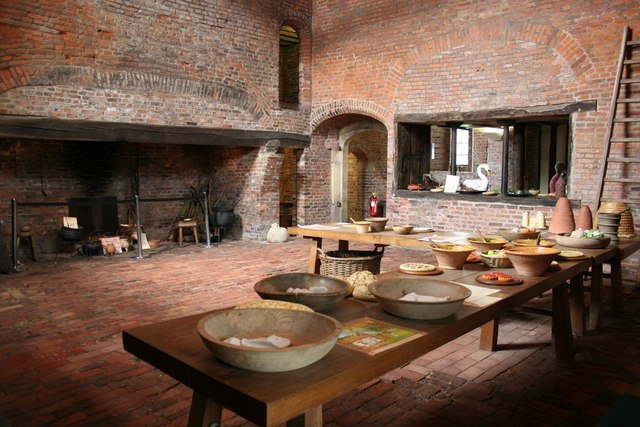
The kitchen

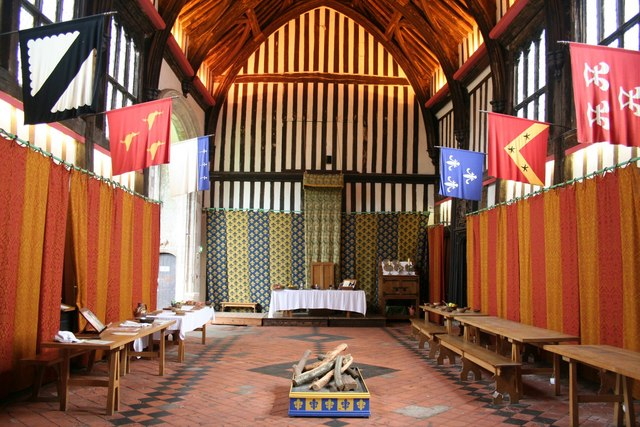
The Great Hall

== Literature ==
Lindley P. (ed), (1991), Gainsborough Old Hall, Occasional Papers in Lincoln Archaeology and History, No.8. Society for Lincolnshire History and Archaeology, ISBN 0904680967
