= Kirton in Lindsey =

Town and civil parish in the North Lincolnshire district, of Lincolnshire, England

Coordinates: 53.48°N 0.59°W

Kirton in Lindsey: Kirton Lindsey
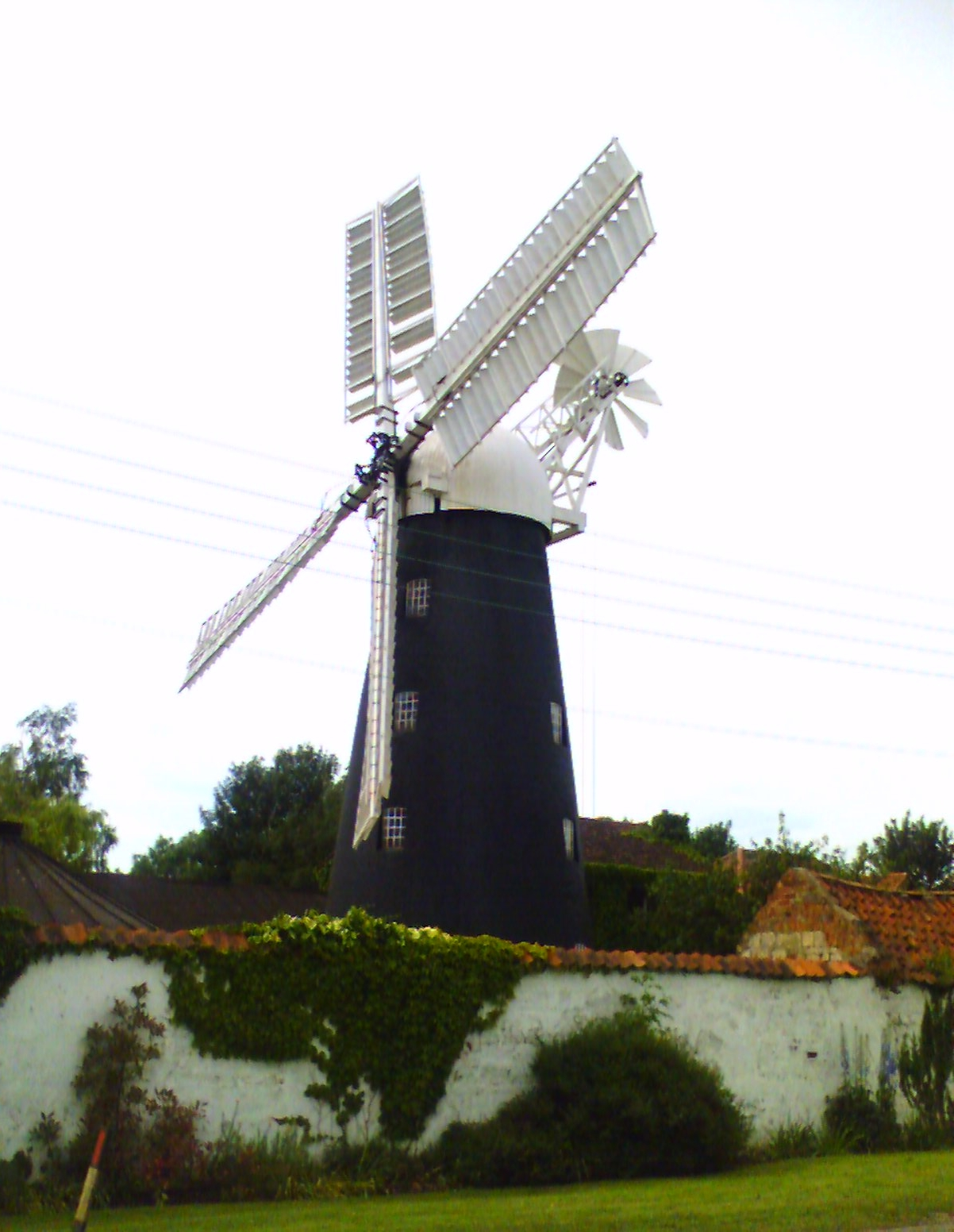
- Mount Pleasant Mill

- Location within Lincolnshire
- Population: 3,063 (2021 Census)
- Demonym: Kirtonian
- OS grid reference: SK936986
  - London: 135 mi (217 km) SSE
- Unitary authority: North Lincolnshire
- Ceremonial county: Lincolnshire
- Region: Yorkshire and the Humber
- Country: England
- Sovereign state: United Kingdom
- Post town: GAINSBOROUGH
- Postcode district: DN21
- Dialling code: 01652
- Police: Humberside
- Fire: Humberside
- Ambulance: East Midlands
- UK Parliament: Scunthorpe

Kirton in Lindsey, also abbreviated to Kirton Lindsey, is a market town and civil parish in North Lincolnshire, England. It is 7 miles (11 km) south-east from Scunthorpe.

== History ==
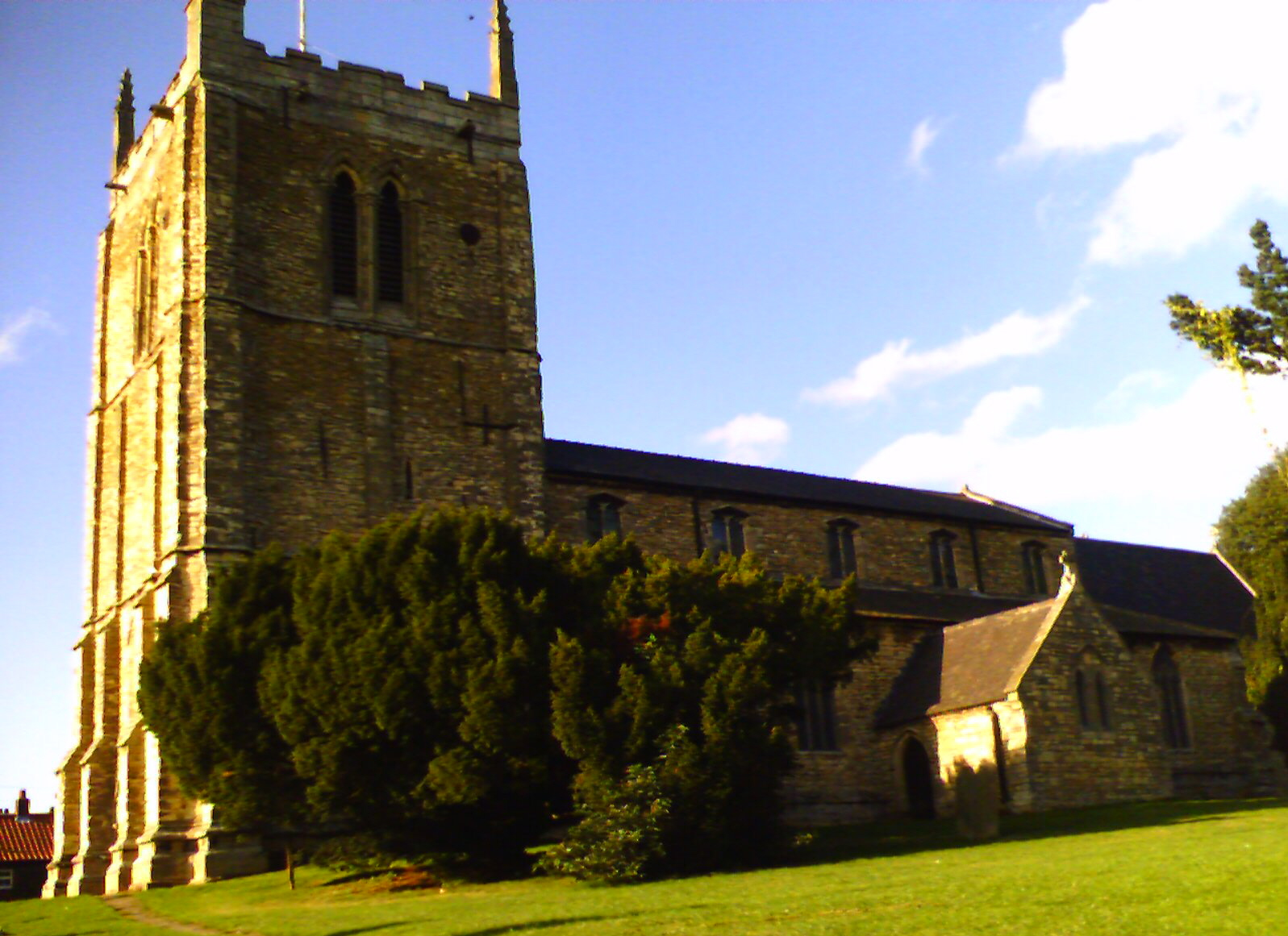
St Andrew's Church

The name Kirton derives from the Old Norse kirkja and the Old English tūn meaning 'settlement with a church'.

Catherine Parr, the sixth wife of Henry VIII lived at Kirton-in-Lindsey after she married her first husband, Sir Edward Burgh. Edward's father, Sir Thomas Burgh, 1st Baron Burgh was a steward to the manor of the soke of Kirton-in-Lindsey. In October 1530, Sir Thomas secured a joint patent in survivorship with his son, Sir Edward Burgh, granting them a modest manor.

== Governance ==
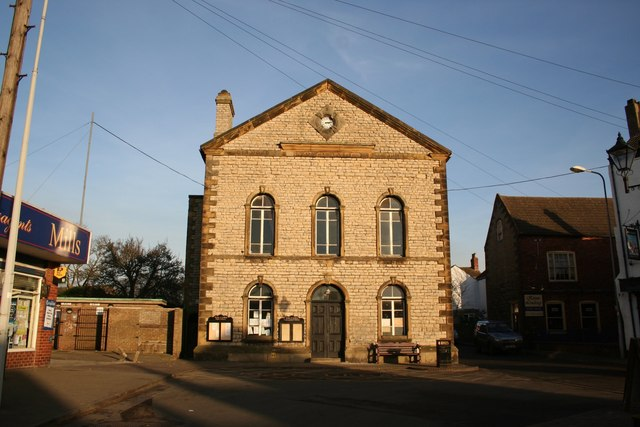
Kirton in Lindsey Town Hall

Historically part of the West Riding of the parts of Lindsey, in the county of Lincolnshire, Kirton became part of Glanford Brigg poor law union in the 19th century and thus ended up in Glanford Brigg Rural District from 1894 and then from 1974 to 1996 the Glanford district of Humberside. This became part of North Lincolnshire in 1996. At the parish level there is Kirton-in-Lindsey Town Council which is based at Kirton in Lindsey Town Hall.

== Geography ==
The 2011 Census recorded a total resident population of 2,873.

The town is situated half on top, and half on the side of a ridge, part of the Lincoln Cliff. It is 6 miles (9.7 km) south from the M180 motorway and 10 miles (16.1 km) south from the centre of Scunthorpe. The B1398 Lincoln to Scunthorpe road passes through the town, as does the B1400 which runs down the north side of the ridge to Messingham as the Cleatham Road. The A15 road is 1.5 miles (2.4 km) to the east. Grayingham, and the Lincolnshire boundary along the B1205, is 1 mile (1.6 km) to the south. The town is served on Mondays to Fridays only (one train each way ) by Kirton Lindsey railway station, on the B1400 is the site of the former RAF Kirton in Lindsey. The town is also served by the 103 bus route which runs Monday to Saturday, every 2 hours, between Lincoln & Scunthorpe. North of the town, on the ridge next to the B1398, is Mount Pleasant Mill (where flour is still produced & bread is made from it in the bakery alongside) & from here there is a view over the Trent Valley over to the west.

== Economy ==
There are independent shops on High Street and in the Market Place (which has car parking), including: a chemist, a bakers, a sweet shop, a chocolatier & ice cream shop, an acupuncturist, and several hairdressers (for men & women). Plus a Spar shop, & a Lincolnshire Co-op food shop. Also in the Market Place is Kirton in Lindsey Town Hall (built in 1897 to commemorate Queen Victoria's diamond jubilee).

RAF Kirton in Lindsey, situated between the B1400 and B1398 on top of the ridge to the south-east of the town, closed at the end of March 2012.

== Media ==
Television signals are received from either Emley Moor or Belmont TV transmitters. Local radio stations are BBC Radio Lincolnshire, Greatest Hits Radio Lincolnshire, Hits Radio Lincolnshire and Steel FM, a community based radio station which broadcast from its studio in Scunthorpe. The town is served by the local newspaper, Scunthorpe Telegraph.

== Education ==
Huntcliff School

The local secondary modern, comprehensive, single status academy school is Huntcliff School, (named after Alderman W. Hunt), on Redbourne Mere (B1206), which received a Grade 2 "good" Ofsted report in 2015. There is also Kirton in Lindsey Primary School.

== Religious sites ==
St Andrew's United Church includes Anglican, Methodist and Baptist congregations. There was a Salvation Army Hall, formerly a Primitive Methodist church.
