= Mount Pleasant Mill =

Windmill in Lincolnshire, England

Coordinates: 53.4827°N 0.5862°W

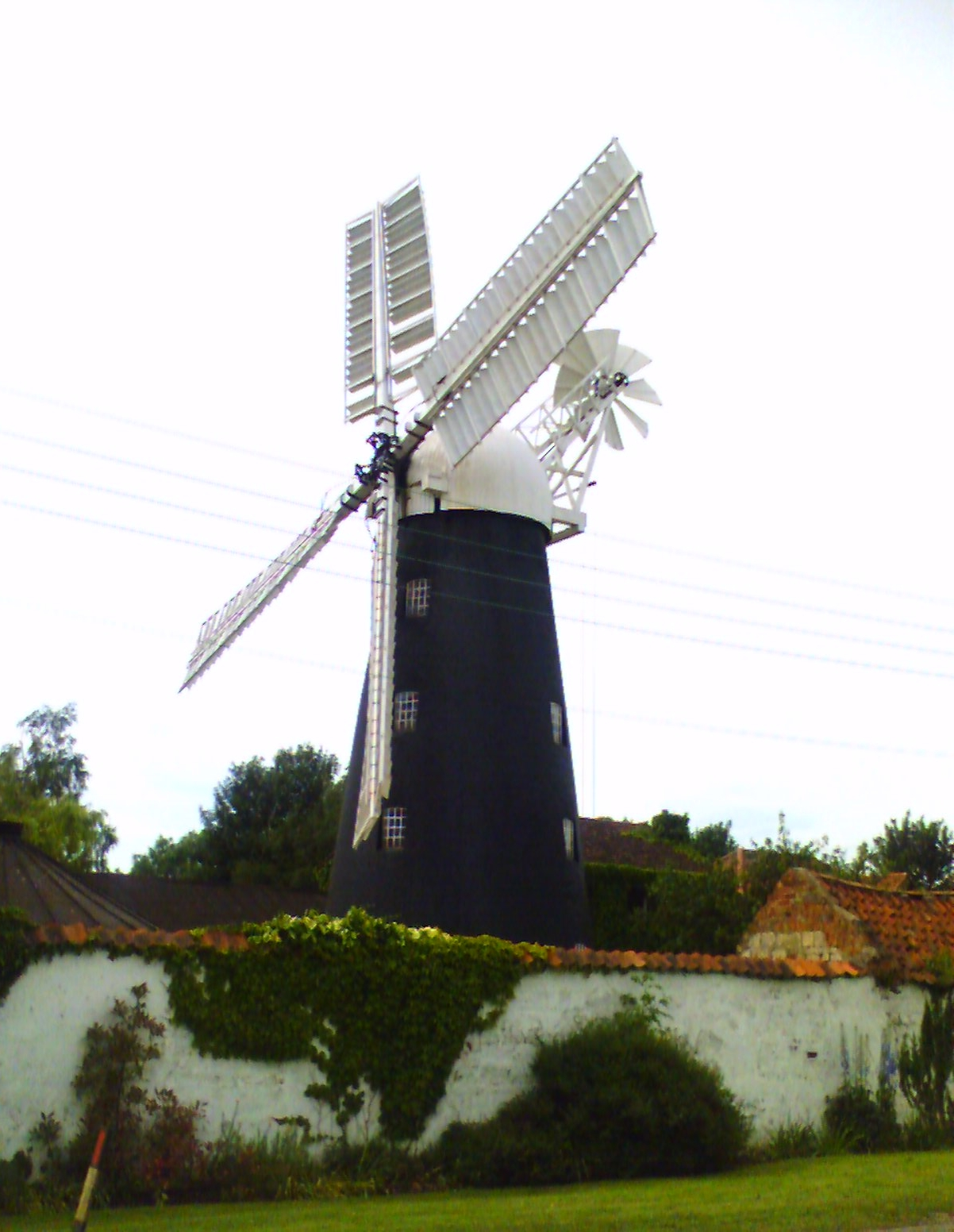
Mount Pleasant Mill, Lincolnshire

Mount Pleasant Mill is a windmill north of Kirton in Lindsey on the North Cliff Road in North Lincolnshire in the east of England (Yorkshire and the Humber).

== Construction ==
It was built in 1875 for miller Edric Lansdall as a four-patent-sailed, slightly tapering four-storeyed tarred tower mill with onion-shaped cap and fantail on top of the remaining roundhouse of a previously erected post-mill. The junction between the former roundhouse wall of hand-made bricks and the newly superimposed tower made of machine-moulded bricks is almost indistinguishable. On the second floor, the stone floor, originally three pairs of millstones (two pairs of peak stones (grey stones or greys) and one pair of quartzite (French stone)) were driven, of which only one grey pair remained. This peak stone is cut from rock millstone grit quarried in the Peak District of southwest Yorkshire and northeast Derbyshire, England.

The mill has had a namesake windmill in Stockton-on-Tees, built around 1790 as an 8-storeyed four-sailed stage-windmill of ca. 80 ft height in reverse colours (white painted tower with black onion-shaped cap) and demolished around the late 1920s.

== History ==
Mount Pleasant Mill worked by wind until 1933 and by a diesel single cylinder Crossley engine until 1973. Fred Banks, who ran it then, also owned Alford Windmill. It is the only windmill in the area beside Heapham Mill with original and unrestored equipment and machinery of the 1920s and 1930s. The original cap with the oak cap frame is still in place. The original windshaft, wallower, upright shaft and great spur wheel are made of cast iron, as are the tooth ring of the wooden brakewheel with its timber clasp arm construction and wooden brake, all installed in the 1930s. A refinement to the mill is the elevator to replace the old sack hoist which worked off the underside of the wallower by a friction ring, and the elevator to feed the first floor bin (3rd floor) for the hurst frame. This is a massive timber frame supporting the transfer gearing and heavy mill stones casings, helping to reduce the vibration of the turning mill stones and their wheels (stone nuts). It is a separate structure inside the mill tower thus reducing the transfer of vibrations and noise into the building itself.

The mill was restored in 1991 and is a commercially working flour mill, making organic flour which is sold to the public. There is a tea room for visitors.

On 29 November 2015 the windmill was severely damaged by high winds, causing two of the sails and the tail-fan to be torn off - some pieces landing 200 yards (180 m) away. The mill was shut for two weeks and is now up and running through the use of electric motors powering the French burr stones and the Derbyshire peaks. Business is continuing as usual producing a range of organic flours and fresh breads using a wood-fired oven.
