= Kirton in Lindsey Town Hall =

Community building in Kirton in Lindsey, Lincolnshire, England

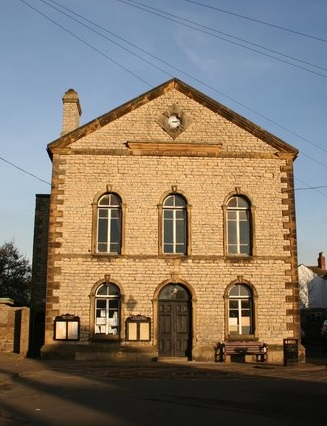
- Kirton in Lindsey Town Hall

- Shown in Lincolnshire
- 53.4765°N 0.5886°W
- Location: Market Place, Kirton in Lindsey

History
- Built: 1899

Site notes
- Architect: J. K. Broughton
- Architectural style: Palladian style

Listed Building – Grade II
- Official name: Town Hall
- Designated: 7 March 1985
- Reference no.: 1160694

Kirton in Lindsey Town Hall is a Grade II listed building. It is a community building within the Market Place in Kirton in Lindsey, Lincolnshire, England.

== History ==
The first municipal building in the town was an old courthouse: it was used as the venue for manorial court hearings and the depository for manorial records and was completed in 1762. In the late 19th century, civic leaders decided to erect a new structure to celebrate the Diamond Jubilee of Queen Victoria. The site they selected was occupied by the Greyhound Inn and was donated to the town by William Emberton-Fox of Northorpe Hall.

The foundation stone for the new building was laid by the Member of Parliament, Emerson Bainbridge, on 16 June 1897. It was designed by a local architect, J. K. Broughton, in the Palladian style and built in limestone which had been recovered from an 18th-century house of correction. The new building was officially opened on 14 June 1899. The design involved a symmetrical main frontage with three bays facing onto the east side of the Market Square; the central bay featured a round headed doorway with a fanlight, an ashlar surround and a keystone. The outer bays on the ground floor and the bays on the first floor were fenestrated by round headed casement windows with ashlar surrounds and keystones. The front elevation was surmounted by a band inscribed with the words "Diamond Jubilee Town Hall" and by a pediment with an oculus in the tympanum. Internally, the principal rooms were the upper hall and the lower hall.

The town hall continued to be the meeting place of the parish council for much of the 20th century and, following local government re-organisation in 1974, it served as the meeting place of the town council. By the late 20th century the condition of the building had deteriorated significantly and it became unable to host large functions. The building was closed completely in 2009 so that a major programme of refurbishment works could be carried out at a cost of £1 million. The works, which were financed by Heritage Lottery Fund, North Lincolnshire Council and Kirton Town Council and included space for a new local heritage centre, were completed in time for the building to be re-opened by the Earl of Wessex in June 2011. The town hall became available for theatre and concert events again with performers such as the Canadian folk trio, The Once, appearing in March 2014. The town council also moved its own offices back into the town hall in November 2017.
