= Reynold Cobham, 1st Baron Cobham of Sterborough =

English knight and diplomat

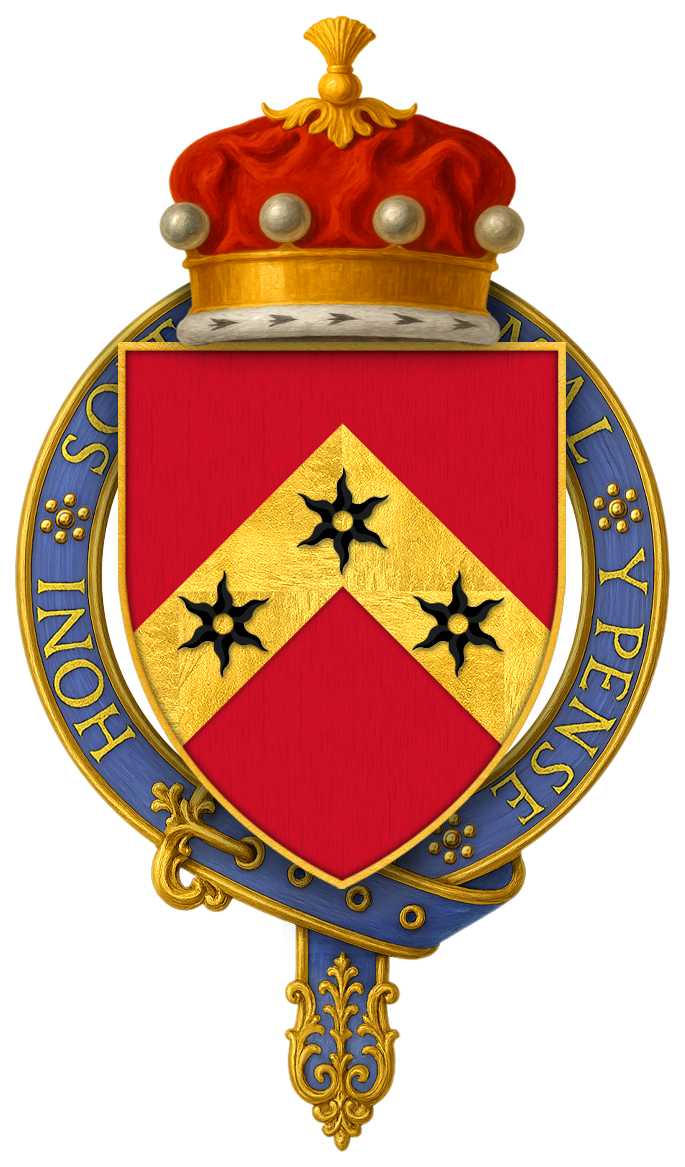
Arms of Sir Reynold Cobham, 1st Baron Cobham of Sterborough, KG

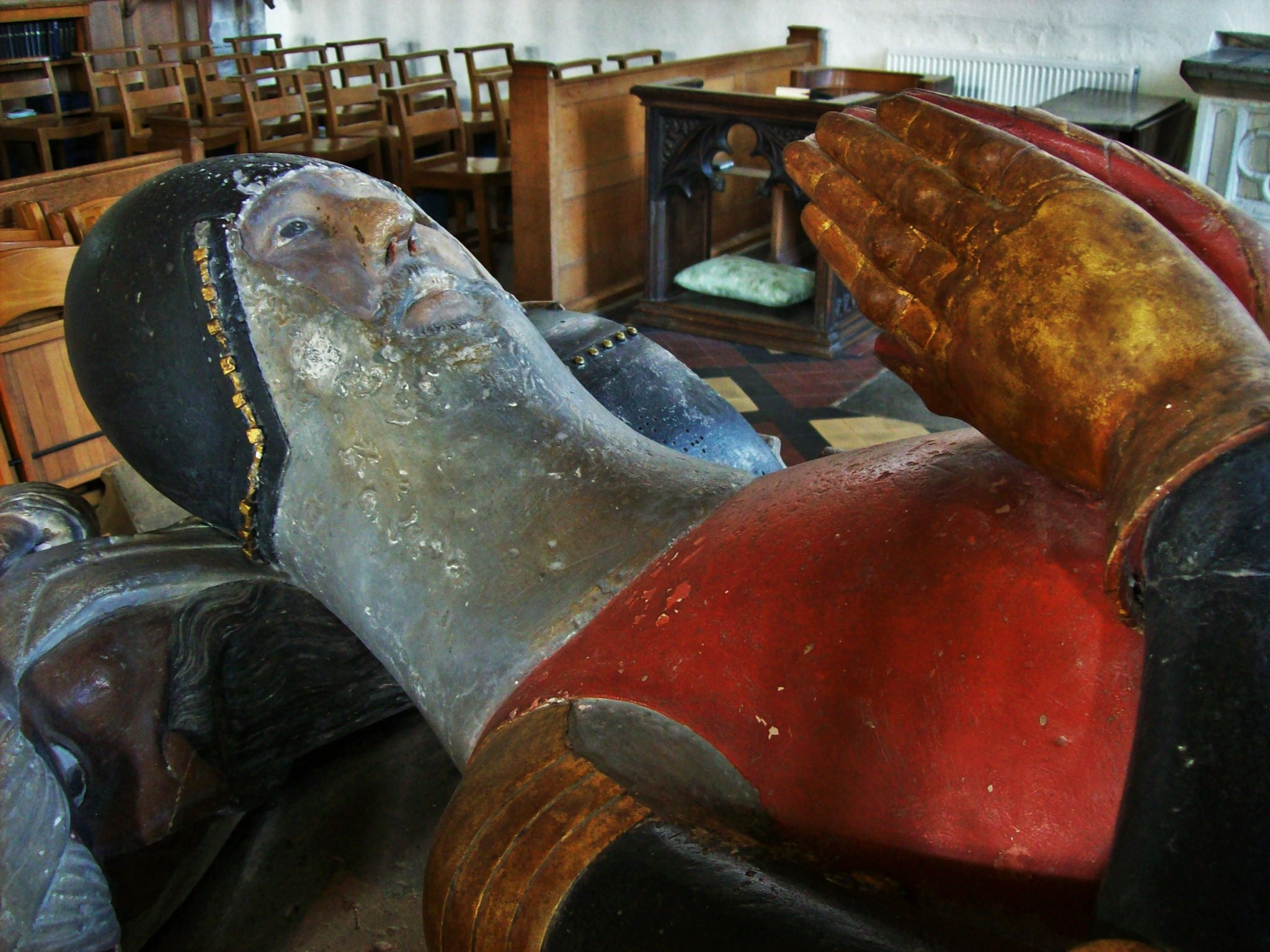
Reynold Cobham tomb, Lingfield church

Reynold (or Reginald) Cobham, 1st Baron Cobham of Sterborough KG (c.1295–1361) was a medieval English knight and diplomat.

== Life ==
The family were based at Sterborough Castle, Lingfield, Surrey.

In his early life he was employed on diplomatic missions. By 1334 he was a knight in the household of King Edward III and fought in the Scottish campaign against David de Bruce and then on the continent in the Low Countries and Brittany. During the Siege of Tournai (1340) he held the office of "marshal of the army", a role specific to a particular army and distinct from the hereditary position of Lord Marshal of England. In 1342 he was summoned to the House of Lords as Lord Cobham of Sterborough.

In 1346 he was in the force under Edward III that attacked France, fighting at the Battle of Crécy and the protracted but eventually successful Siege of Calais. In 1352 he was invested as a Knight of the Garter and in 1353 appointed Captain of Calais, a position he held until his death. In 1355 he served under the Edward the Black Prince in Aquitaine, taking part in his march to the Loire and his victory at the Battle of Poitiers, where he was credited by the French historian Jean Froissart with the slaying of the French knight Geoffroi de Charny.

He died in 1361, probably of the plague, and was laid to rest in an impressive tomb in Lingfield church. He was succeeded by his son Reynold, the second Lord Sterborough.

Peerage of England
Preceded by New Creation	Baron Cobham; 1342–1361	Succeeded by Reginald de Cobham
