= Thomas Burgh of Gainsborough =

English gentleman of Gainsborough, Lincolnshire (c.1431–1496)

Sir Thomas Burgh
- 1st Baron Burgh of Gainsborough
- Born: c. 1431; Gainsborough, Lincolnshire, England
- Died: 18 March 1496 (aged 64–65)
- Buried: Gainsborough, Lincolnshire, England
- Spouse: Margaret de Ros
- Issue: Edward Burgh; Thomas Burgh; Margaret Burgh; Elizabeth Burgh; Anne Burgh
- Father: Thomas Burgh
- Mother: Elizabeth Percy

Sir Thomas Burgh KG (/ˈbʌrə/ BURR-ə; c. 1431 – 18 March 1496) was an English gentleman.

== Ancestry ==
He had noble ancestors on both sides: his mother, Elizabeth Percy, was one of the daughters of Sir Henry Percy, who was in turn grandson to Henry Percy, 1st Earl of Northumberland, and to David of Strathbogie, Earl of Atholl, descended from the ancient Mormaers of Atholl.

The Burgh family sprang from Hubert de Burgh, younger son of Hubert de Burgh, 1st Earl of Kent, and his wife Beatrice de Warrenne, daughter of William de Warrenne, Lord of Wormegay, and Beatrice de Pierrepont. The Burghs were rich, flamboyant and powerful people. Thomas was in great favour with the King and many offices, positions, land grants, and pensions were bestowed upon him.

== Career ==
Thomas was Esquire of the Body to King Edward IV of England and by Christmas 1462, Thomas was created a Knight by the King and a Privy Councillor. Sir Thomas slowly became the King's chief man in Lincolnshire where he held manors, land, tenements from Northumberland (from his mother's inheritance, which he shared with her sister Margaret, Baroness Grey of Codnor) through Westmorland, Yorkshire, and Lincolnshire, down to his wife's dower lands in Somerset. Thomas became a rich man who was backed by the King and soon found himself giving advice and legal help to the people of Lincolnshire as well as becoming their Sheriff in 1460 and their representative in Parliament.

It was Sir Thomas Burgh with Sir Thomas Stanley who rescued King Edward IV from the Earl of Warwick whom the Earl had kept prisoner in his castle of Middleham. In 1471, when Edward IV came to reclaim his throne it was Sir Thomas who was first to rally to his side. Sir Thomas fought at the battles of Barnet and Tewkesbury.

After the unexpected death of Edward IV, Sir Thomas was courted by King Richard III of England, who admitted him to the Order of the Garter. Sir Thomas initially supported Richard, but was more interested in securing the future of Henry Tudor, Earl of Richmond, who would become King in 1485. Although Thomas fought in the Battle of Bosworth, his role was kept secret by chroniclers and he was soon in good standing with the new king. After his accession to the throne, King Henry confirmed Sir Thomas as Knight of the Body and Privy Councillor.

== Gainsborough Old Hall ==
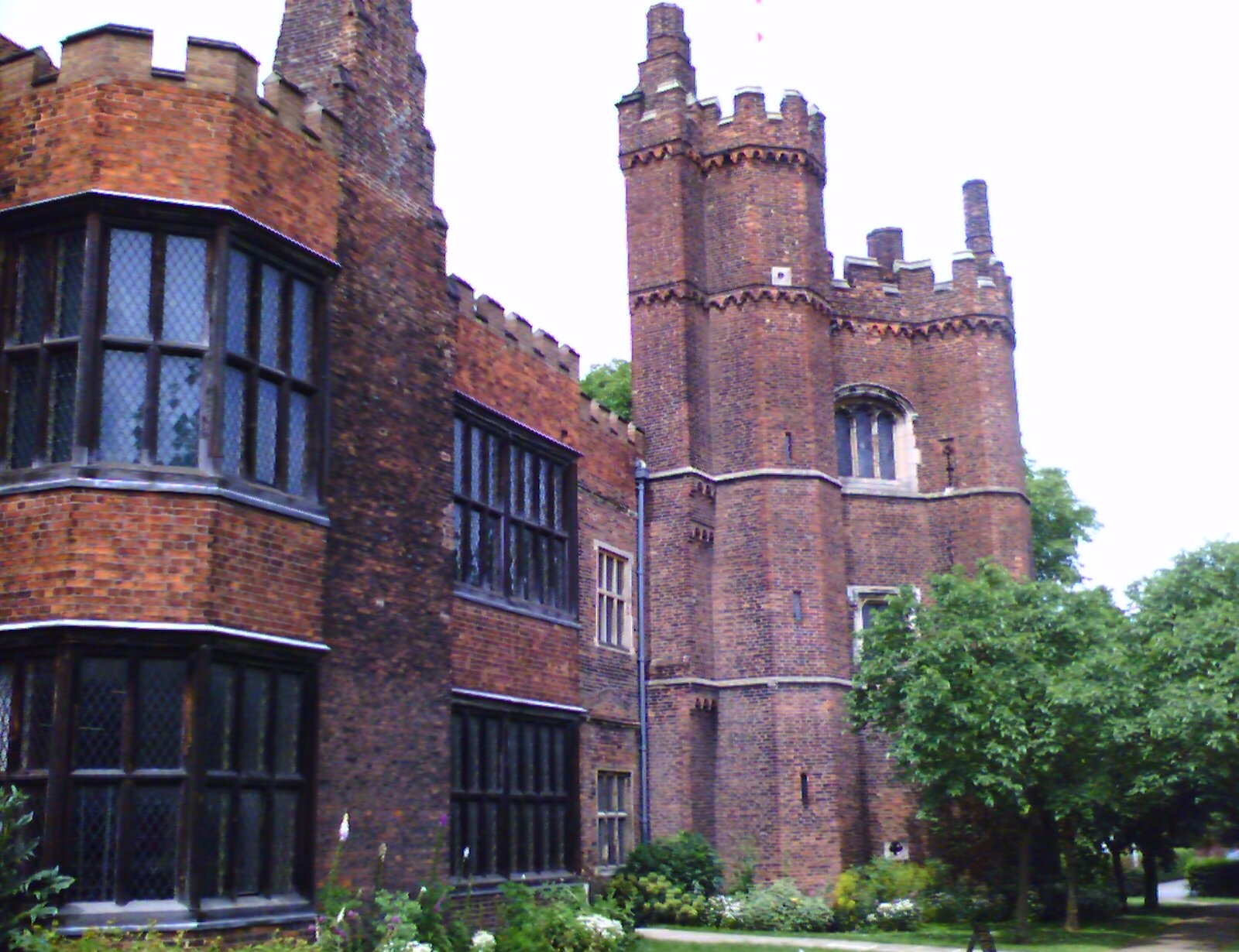
Gainsborough Old Hall Tower

In 1460, Sir Thomas built the great Old Hall in Gainsborough, Lincolnshire. Gainsborough Old Hall was not only their home, but also a demonstration of their wealth and importance. Sir Thomas was a great benefactor to Newark Church and also the founder of the Chantry and Alms House at Gainsborough. In 1470, the manor was attacked by Sir Robert Welles over a clash about lands, status, and honour, and part of it was "pullede downe" according to Warkworth's Chronicle. It was in 1484 that Sir Thomas entertained King Richard III in his hall. Today, the Hall with its elaborate timber roof survives as well as the kitchen—possibly the most complete medieval kitchen in England. The Hall is over five hundred years old and one of the best preserved medieval manor houses in England.

== Marriage ==
Sir Thomas married Margaret de Ros (1432–1488) widow of William de Botreaux, 3rd Baron Botreaux (1389–1462). Margaret was the daughter of Sir Thomas de Ros, 8th Baron de Ros, and Lady Eleanor Beauchamp, second daughter of Richard Beauchamp, 13th Earl of Warwick, and Elizabeth Berkeley. Lady Eleanor was an older paternal half-sister of Henry de Beauchamp, 1st Duke of Warwick, and Anne Neville, Countess of Warwick. After the death of 8th Baron Ros, Margaret's mother, Lady Eleanor, married Edmund Beaufort, 2nd Duke of Somerset, thus making Margaret a maternal half-sister of the Duke of Somerset.

Sir Thomas and Margaret had the following children:

- Edward Burgh, 2nd Baron Burgh, married Anne Cobham, daughter of Thomas Cobham, 5th Baron Cobham, and Lady Anne Stafford, and had issue. His grandson, Sir Edward Burgh, would marry Catherine Parr; later Queen consort of King Henry VIII.
- Elizabeth Burgh (d. 1 August 1507), married Richard FitzHugh, 6th Lord FitzHugh and secondly Sir Henry Willoughby. In his will, her father gave her "a book of gold enamelled" which had been her mother's.
- Margaret Burgh (d. before April 1493), married Sir George Tailboys. Like her brother Edward, Lord Burgh, her husband Sir George was found to be a lunatic, in 1531.
- Thomas Burgh In his will, his father gave him a cross of gold with an emerald.
- Anne Burgh In his will, her father gave her a cross of gold set with precious stones and rubies.

== Peerage ==
In records, the peerage, and genealogy books he is shown as being created 1st Lord Burgh, of Gainsborough {England by writ} on 1 September 1487. He was several times summoned to Parliament, but never sat; whether he held a hereditary peerage is not clear; fifteenth century records treat him as a knight. His son was never summoned to Parliament (because he was found insane in 1510); his grandson was summoned and sat in the House of Lords, but sixteenth century records treat this as a new creation in 1529 after the death of his father. When the Burgh peerage was drawn out of abeyance in 1916, however, it was given precedence as of 1487.

== Death and succession ==
Sir Thomas died on 18 March 1496. He was buried next to his wife, Margaret, in the family vault in Holy Trinity Church, Gainsborough, though their tomb has since disappeared.

== See also ==
- House of Burgh, an Anglo-Norman and Hiberno-Norman dynasty founded in 1193
- Hubert de Burgh, 1st Earl of Kent (c.1170–1243) English nobleman and ancestor of the Burghs of Gainsborough

Political offices
| Preceded by | Master of the Duchy of Lancaster; 1461-? | Succeeded by |
| Preceded by | Steward of the Honour of Bolingbroke; 3 December 1461 – 18 March 1496 | Succeeded by |
| Preceded by | Constable of Lincoln Castle; 3 December 1461 – 18 March 1496 | Succeeded by |
| Preceded by John Marmyon | High Sheriff of Lincolnshire; 1461 | Succeeded by Thomas Blount |
Court offices
| Preceded by John Beauchamp | Master of the Horse | Succeeded by John Cheyne |
Peerage of England
| New creation | Baron Burgh; 1 September 1487 – 18 March 1496 | Extinct |
