= Strike (unit) =

A strike is an obsolete unit of volume once used for dry measure in the United Kingdom, with various meanings. According to the SOED, "in some districts" equivalent to a half-bushel, in others to two or four bushels.
