= Baron Burgh =

Title in the Peerage of England

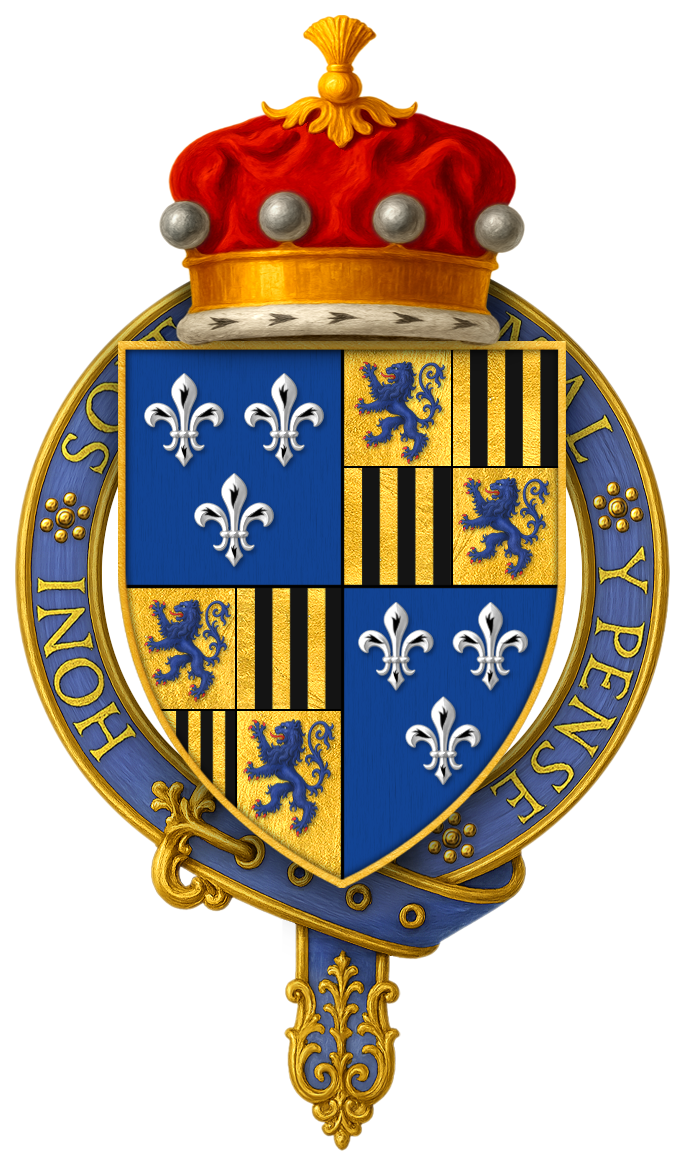
- Arms of Thomas Burgh, 1st Baron Burgh
- Creation date: 1327 (1st creation); 1487?/1529 (2nd creation)
- Created by: Edward III; Henry VII
- Peerage: Peerage of England
- First holder: William de Burgh, 3rd Earl of Ulster (1st creation)
- Last holder: Edward IV (1st creation)
- Present holder: Alexander Leith, 8th Baron Burgh
- Heir apparent: Alexander Leith
- Status: Extant (2nd creation)
- Extinction date: 1461 (1st creation)

Baron Burgh (/bɜːr/ BUR or /ˈbʌrə/ BURR-ə) is a title that has been created twice in the Peerage of England.

The first creation was for William de Burgh in 1327, who was later Earl of Ulster, and both these titles later merged with the Crown in 1461.

The second, and still existing, peerage is of uncertain date. No Burgh sat in the House of Lords before 1529; the grandfather of that Lord Burgh had been summoned to the House in 1487, but did not sit; whether this was sufficient to create a barony by writ is debatable. This Barony was in abeyance for over three hundred years; when it was called out of abeyance, in 1916, it was accorded precedence as of 1487.

== History ==
=== First creation, 1327 ===
Arms of William de Burgh.

William de Burgh, 3rd Earl of Ulster was summoned to the English Parliament in 1327 and 1328, by writs addressed Willelmo de Burgh, which, by modern law, would create a Barony of Burgh (English: /bɜːr/; BER).

He was also summoned in 1331 as Comes de Ulton' (that is, Earl of Ulster) for a Parliament discussing Irish affairs.

Insofar as these created English peerages, they later merged in the Crown when his descendant, Edward IV, acceded to the throne in 1461.

=== Second creation, 1487 and 1529 ===
Sir Thomas Burgh of Gainsborough (English: /bʊræ/; BURRA), a distinguished Yorkist, was summoned to the Parliament of 1487 under Henry VII of England; there is no evidence that he attended. Some three weeks later, Henry VII signed a warrant ordering a writ to be issued for him, since the King intended to raise him to the pre-eminence of Barony, but no second writ was issued, nor was a patent. He was issued writs, but did not attend Parliament, for the rest of his life, until 1496; official documents call him a knight, not a peer.

His son, Sir Edward Burgh was never summoned to the House of Lords, although he was elected to the House of Commons in his father's lifetime. In 1510, he was found a lunatic, being "distracted of memorie." His wife was Anne Cobham, by modern doctrine Baroness Cobham of Sterborough.

In the third generation, Sir Thomas Burgh, Sir Edward's son, was summoned to the first Parliament after his father's death, and admitted on 2 December 1529. In the sixteenth century, this was treated as a new creation; Thomas, Baron Burgh, yielded precedence to the Barons Hussey, Windsor, Wentworth, all created 1 and 2 December 1529.

By modern law, the events of 1487 would not normally constitute a creation, for the elder Sir Thomas never sat as a peer; nevertheless, in 1916, the revived peerage was given precedence as of 1487. Sources vary, therefore, in calling the younger Sir Thomas 1st or 3rd Baron Burgh; this article calls him 1st, de jure 3rd.

=== Abeyance ===
The most prominent of the Lords Burgh, Thomas Burgh, 3rd Baron Burgh, grandson of the baron of 1529, was Lord Deputy of Ireland; when he died in 1597, he left four daughters, all of whom married and had children, and an infant son. When his son died at the age of eight, the barony of Burgh (according to modern law) went into abeyance between the daughters. By this, each daughter had a quarter share of the barony, which she transmitted to her heir; none of them holds the barony unless the Crown decides which of the four co-heirs is to have it; in this case it was not decided until 1916. (The first exercise of this power was in 1604, two years after the death of the young Baron, in the case of Baron le Despencer.)

The eldest daughter of the Lord Deputy, Elizabeth, had married George Brooke, who was executed and attainted in 1603, for his part in the Bye Plot against King James I; he was heir to Henry Brooke, 11th Baron Cobham, who was also attainted for his part in the Main Plot. None of this affected Elizabeth Brooke's rights, and the abeyance was eventually resolved in favour one of her descendants; but her family was not welcomed by King James or his son: William Brooke, her son, was restored in blood in 1610, but not to the Barony of Cobham; he did not request the Barony of Burgh.

The second daughter, Anne, married Sir Drew Drury; the third daughter married Francis Coppinger, whose descendant has changed his name to de Burgh; the fourth daughter Katherine married Thomas Knyvett, who was also (by modern law) Baron Berners.

The inheritance of the Barony of Cobham and Elizabeth Brooke's quarter of the Barony of Burgh is discussed under Baron Cobham; this is not the Barony of Cobham of Sterborough held by Edward Burgh's wife, above, although the families are related.

=== Inheritance and revival ===
By the late eighteenth century, Elizabeth Brooke's inheritance was again united in Sir William Boothby, 4th Baronet; when he died in 1787, the quarter of the Barony of Burgh, and the heirship to Cobham, passed to his only sister, Mrs. Mary Disney.

She had six daughters, three of whom had children.

== Barons Burgh, First Creation (1327) ==
- William de Burgh, 3rd Earl of Ulster, 1st Baron Burgh.

== de jure Barons Burgh, Second Creation (1487–1529) ==
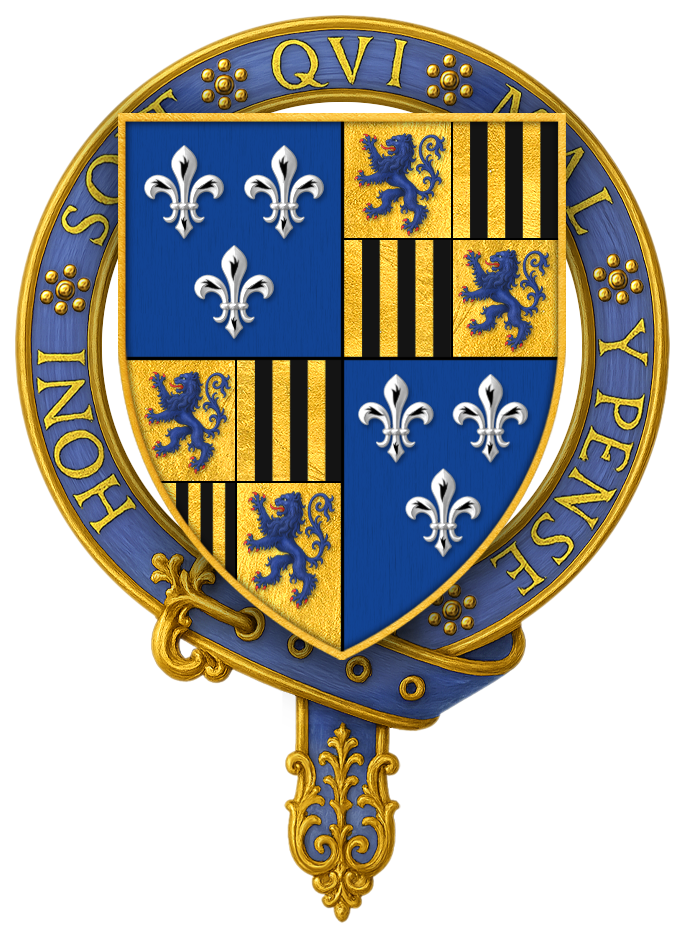
Arms of Sir Thomas Burgh, at the time of his installation as a Knight of the Garter.

- Thomas Burgh, de jure 1st Baron Burgh (1431- 1496)
- Edward Burgh, de jure 2nd Baron Burgh (1464-1528)

== Barons Burgh, Second Creation (1529) ==
- Thomas Burgh, 1st Baron Burgh (1488-1550), by the decision of 1916 3rd Baron.
- William Burgh, 2nd Baron Burgh or 4th Baron(1522–1584).
- Thomas Burgh, 3rd Baron Burgh or 5th Baron (1558–1597). Ambassador to Scotland, Lord Deputy in Ireland.
- Robert Burgh, 4th Baron Burgh or 6th baron (1594–1602).

By modern law, title abeyant 1602

== Barons Burgh, Second Creation (1529; Revived 1916) ==
- Alexander Henry Leith, 5th Baron Burgh (1866–1926) (abeyance terminated 1916) married secondly Phyllis (1892-1972) (daughter of Mark Henry George Goldie), with whom son, 6th baron.
- Alexander Leigh Henry Leith, 6th Baron Burgh (1906–1959)
- Alexander Peter Willoughby Leith, 7th Baron Burgh (1935–2001)
- Alexander Gregory Disney Leith, 8th Baron Burgh (b. 1958)

The heir apparent is the present holder's son Alexander James Strachan Leith (b. 1986).

== See also ==
- House of Burgh, an Anglo-Norman and Hiberno-Norman dynasty founded in 1193
- Baron Strabolgi
- Baron Cobham (1313 creation)

== External links (Re-enactment) ==
- Sir Thomas Lord Burgh K.G.'s Retinue (1460–1496) Historical Interpretation and Living History from the Wars of the Roses
- City of Lincoln Waites The Mayor of Lincoln's Own Band of Musick
