= Edward Burgh (baron) =

English peer (c. 1463 – 1528)

Sir Edward Burgh
- 2nd Baron Burgh of Gainsborough
- Born: c. 1463
- Died: 20 August 1528 (aged 64–65)
- Spouse: Anne Cobham
- Issue: Thomas Burgh, 1st Baron Burgh of Gainsborough; Sir Henry Burgh
- Father: Sir Thomas Burgh, 1st Baron Burgh
- Mother: Margaret Ros

Edward Burgh, 2nd Baron Burgh of Gainsborough (/ˈbʌrə/ BURR-ə; c. 1463 – 20 August 1528), de jure 4th Baron Strabolgi, was an English peer.

== Life ==
Edward Burgh was born in 1461 to Sir Thomas Burgh, 1st Baron Burgh in Lincolnshire, and Margaret de Ros. He was knighted at Stoke Field in 1487. He succeeded to the title of 2nd Lord Burgh, of Gainsborough [E., 1487] on the death of his father in 1495, although he was never called to Parliament under this writ. In 1510, he was found to be a lunatic, and as such, was never called to Parliament. His mother's family, the Ros family, apparently contained the genetic seeds of insanity which incessant intermarriage spread through the Lincolnshire gentry. Lord Ros of Hamlake, Lord Burgh and his brother-in-law, Sir George Tailboys, all of whom had Ros ancestry, were confirmed lunatics.

== Marriage ==
His first marriage, at the age of 13, was to the 9 year old heiress, Anne Cobham (daughter of Sir Thomas, de jure 5th Baron Cobham of Sterborough and Lady Anne Stafford) who had been "affianced" to the recently deceased Edward Blount, 2nd Baron Mountjoy: she brought him ownership of Sterborough Castle. Anne Cobham succeeded to the title of 6th Baroness Cobham de jure in 1471. They had two known children: Thomas and Sir Henry Burgh.

It had been thought that the 2nd Baron married Catherine Parr, who went on to become the sixth wife of Henry VIII, in 1529, when she was aged 17, but the 2nd Baron died in August 1528. It is now accepted through recent research of documents and the will of Catherine Parr's mother by biographers Susan E. James, Linda Porter, and David Starkey that she married the 2nd Baron's grandson, who shared his first name. Sir Edward Burgh was the eldest son of the 2nd Baron's eldest son, Sir Thomas Burgh, who would become the 1st Baron by a new creation in 1529. In her will, dated May 1529, Maud Parr, mentioned Sir Thomas, father of Edward, saying "I am indebted to Sir Thomas Borough, knight, for the marriage of my daughter". At the time of his son's marriage, Thomas was 35 years old, which would have meant that Edward was around Catherine's age. Edward was in his twenties and may have been in poor health. Sir Edward Burgh died in the spring of 1533, never fulfilling the title of Lord Burgh.

== Death and succession ==
On the death of the 2nd Baron in 1528, his title passed to his eldest son Sir Thomas Burgh who was created and summoned to Parliament as 1st Lord Burgh of Gainsborough [England by writ] on 2 December 1529. In 1529, Edward's other son, Henry, married Katherine Neville, daughter of Sir Ralph Neville and Anne Warde. Henry and Katherine had one daughter, Anne Burgh, wife of Sir Ralph Vaughan.

== Ancestry ==
Ancestors of Edward Burgh (baron)

16. Sir William Burgh
8. Sir Hugh Burgh
4. Sir Thomas Burgh of Gainsborough
18. John de la Pole
9. Elizabeth de la Pole
19. Katherine Corbet
2. Sir Thomas Burgh, 1st Baron Burgh of Gainsborough
20. Sir Thomas Percy of Northumberland
10. Sir Henry Percy of Atholl
21. Elizabeth of Atholl Strathbogie
5. Elizabeth Percy
11. Elizabeth Bruce
1. Sir Edward Burgh, 2nd Baron Burgh
24. Thomas de Ros, 4th Baron de Ros
12. William de Ros, 6th Baron de Ros
25. Beatrice Stafford
6. Thomas de Ros, 8th Baron de Ros
26. John FitzAlan, 1st Baron Arundel
13. Margaret FitzAlan
27. Eleanor Maltravers, 2nd Baroness Maltravers
3. Margaret Ros
28. Thomas de Beauchamp, 12th Earl of Warwick
14. Richard de Beauchamp, 13th Earl of Warwick
29. Margaret Ferrers
7. Eleanor Beauchamp
30. Thomas de Berkeley, 5th Baron Berkeley
15. Elizabeth de Berkeley, Countess of Warwick
31. Margaret de Lisle, 3rd Baroness Lisle

== See also ==
- House of Burgh, an Anglo-Norman and Hiberno-Norman dynasty founded in 1193
- Hubert de Burgh, 1st Earl of Kent (c.1170–1243) English nobleman and ancestor of the Burghs of Gainsborough

Peerage of England
Preceded by Sir Thomas Burgh	Baron Burgh; 1495–1528	Succeeded by Sir Thomas Burgh
Preceded by Henry Grey	Baron Strabolgi; 1496–1528	Succeeded by Sir Thomas Burgh
