= Thomas Cobham, 5th Baron Cobham =

English nobleman

Thomas Cobham, de jure 5th Baron Cobham (died 26 April 1471) of Sterborough Castle, and from 1460 de jure 5th Baron Cobham, was an English nobleman.

== Life ==
Sir Thomas was the second son of Reginald de Cobham, de jure 3rd Baron Cobham by his first wife, Eleanor, daughter of Sir Thomas Culpeper. He was also the brother of Eleanor Cobham, who was the second wife of Humphrey, Duke of Gloucester and accused of treasonable necromancy against Henry VI. Sir Thomas succeeded to the family estates on the death, s.p., of his niece, Margaret Neville, Countess of Westmorland (née Cobham).

He married (second) Lady Anne Stafford (1446–c. 14 April 1472, bur Lingfield, Surrey), daughter of Humphrey Stafford, 1st Duke of Buckingham and Lady Anne Neville, and widow (married firstly April 1460) of Aubrey Vere, JP (died beheaded Tower Hill, London, 20 February 1462, interred at Austin Friars, London), a son of John de Vere, 12th Earl of Oxford.

== Death ==
Cobham died in 1471, without legitimate male issue, and was buried at Lingfield, Surrey. His will, dated 2 April 1471, was proved on 10 July 1471. His daughter Anne succeeded him as de jure 6th Baroness Cobham. Anne married Edward Burgh, 2nd Baron Burgh and the barony passed to her son, Thomas Burgh, 1st Baron Burgh, de jure 7th Baron Cobham.

== Notes ==
Peerage of England
Preceded by Margaret Cobham	Baron Cobham; 1460–1471	Succeeded by Anne Cobham
