= Starborough Castle =

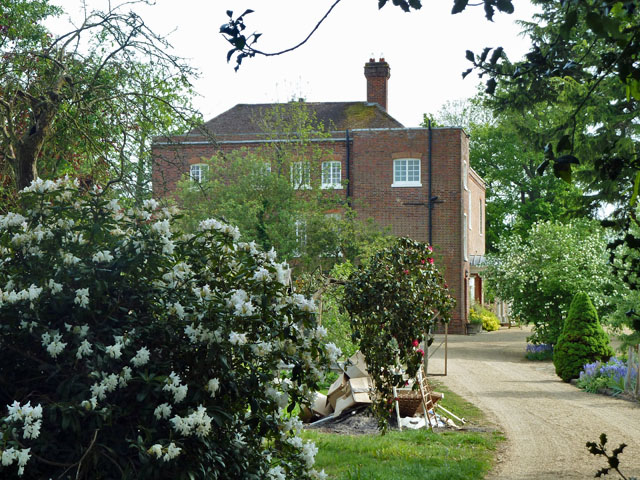

- Location within Surrey
- 51°10′42″N 0°02′19″E
- Type: Garden House
- Location: Dormansland, Surrey
- OS grid reference: TQ4260744120

History
- Built: 1754

Site notes
- Architectural style: Neo-Gothic
- Owner: Private

Scheduled monument
- Official name: Starborough Castle
- Designated: 11 March 1953
- Reference no.: 1017522

Listed Building – Grade II*
- Official name: Starborough Castle Walls and Garden House
- Designated: 11 June 1958
- Reference no.: 1205666

Starborough Castle, known historically as Sterborough Castle, is a Neo-Gothic garden house of dressed sandstone near the eastern boundary of Surrey, built in 1754 by Sir James Burrow. It occupies the north-eastern portion of an artificial island south of the River Eden, roughly 3 km (2 mi) to the south-west of Edenbridge. It is a Grade II* listed building and scheduled monument, and was built on the site of the first castle, a medieval fortified house built c. 1341.

== History ==
The first Starborough Castle was the manor house of Reginald de Cobham, 1st Baron Cobham, and 1st Lord Cobham of Sterborough. On 18 October 1341 Cobham was granted licence by Edward III to crenellate the building, and the following year the building was fortified and became Starborough Castle. The castle was of a similar quadrangular style to Bodiam Castle, consisting of four towers and a gate, surrounded on all sides by a moat, with a central bridge crossing at the south.

After the Battle of Agincourt in 1415, the Duke of Orleans was for a time held captive in the castle. The castle passed to Edward Burgh through his c. 1476 marriage to Anne Cobham, daughter of Sir Thomas, de jure 5th Baron Cobham of Sterborough.

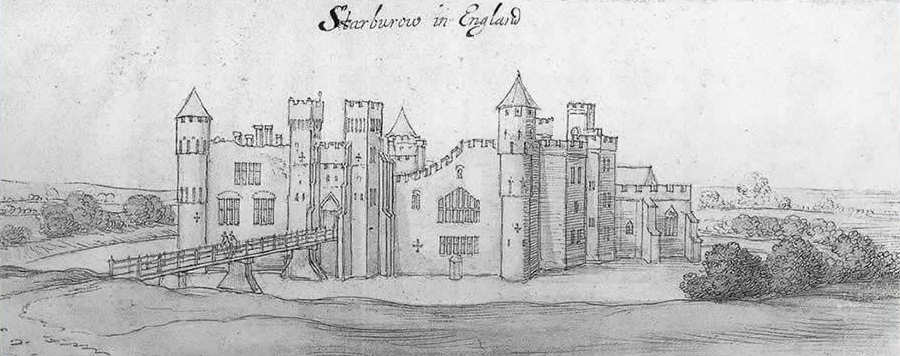
The medieval castle, c. 1640

On 4 July 1648 the castle was ordered to be dismantled by Order of Parliament under the rule of Oliver Cromwell. It was feared the castle would provide a base for Royalist Rebellion forces. Only the moat survives, although parts of the original castle were used to build the present building on the north-east corner of the site.

In the 1700s the site became part of a country garden, before Sir James Burrow constructed the neo-Gothic garden house on the moated island in 1754. He also built a manor house, now known as Starborough Castle, on the site, this was demolished and replaced by a new house near the lake, designed by John Tonge, around 1870. In 1793 the castle was sold to Sir Thomas Turton who carried out work clearing the moat and improving the water supply. He sold the castle to William Bruce Smith in 1812. Later owners were James Moore in 1870 and R V Toynbee, who acquired the, by now, ruined, site in 1933. Ray Edwards, a local farmer and builder, acquired the site in the 1970s and restored the Gothic pavilion before selling it to London gallery owner, Warwick Leadlay. Under Leadlay outbuildings were added, with the site being used for an annual jazz festival. Leadlay placed the castle for sale in 2003.

== See also ==
- Castles in Great Britain and Ireland
- List of castles in England
