= Linda Porter (historian) =

English novelist (born 1947)

- Born: 1947 (age 78–79); Exeter, Devon
- Writing career
- Genres: Biography, history
- Website: www.lindaporter.net

Linda Porter (born 1947) is an English historian and novelist.

== Early life ==
Porter was born in Exeter, Devon in 1947. Her family has long-standing connections to the West Country, but moved to the London area when she was a small child. She was educated at Walthamstow Hall School in Sevenoaks and at the University of York, from which she has a doctorate in History. On completing her postgraduate work, she moved to New York and lectured at Fordham University and the City University of New York.

== Career ==
Porter moved back to England, and has worked as a journalist and been a senior adviser on international public relations to a major telecommunications company. In 2004 she won the Biographers Club/Daily Mail prize. Her first book, Mary Tudor: The First Queen was published in 2007. It was a biography of Queen Mary I of England presented a little-known view of Mary as a decisive and clear-headed ruler, and a skilled political and diplomatic operator.

In 2010, her second book Katherine the Queen: The Remarkable Life of Katherine Parr was published. This biography of Katherine Parr detailed her life as a queen and stepmother.

Her third book, Crown of Thistles: The Fatal Inheritance of Mary Queen of Scots, was published by Macmillan in 2013. It tells the story of a divided family and how Scotland and England because one nation.

In 2014 Porter continued to do public speaking and published articles and book reviews as well as doing research for a fourth book.

Porter's fourth book, Royal Renegades: The Children of Charles I and the English Civil Wars follows the lives of Charles I’s family.

The author’s fifth book, Mistresses: Sex and Scandal at the Court of Charles II, was published in the UK on 16 April 2020.

In 2024, Porter featured at the Caterham History Festival at Caterham School alongside the historians Sir Richard Evans, Geoffrey Hosking and Clare Jackson.

== Personal life ==
Porter is married and has one daughter. She lives in Kent.

== Published works ==
- Mary Tudor: The First Queen (2007) ISBN 978-0-7499-5144-3
- The First Queen of England: The Myth of "Bloody Mary (2008) ISBN 978-0-312-36837-1
- Katherine the Queen: The Remarkable Life of Katherine Parr (2010) ISBN 978-0-230-71039-9
- Katherine the Queen: The Remarkable Life of Katherine Parr, the Last Wife of Henry VIII (2010) ISBN 978-0-312-38438-8
- Crown of Thistles: The Fatal Inheritance of Mary Queen of Scots (2013) ISBN 978-0-230-75364-8
- Tudors Versus Stewarts: The Fatal Inheritance of Mary Queen of Scots (2014) ISBN 978-0-312-59074-1
- Royal Renegades: The Children of Charles I and the English Civil Wars (2016) ISBN 978-1-4472-6754-6
- Mistresses: Sex and Scandal at the Court of Charles II (2020) ISBN 978-1-5098-7705-8
- The Thistle and The Rose: The Extraordinary Life of Margaret Tudor (2024) ISBN 978-1-8011-0578-1
