= Ulick Nally =

Ulick Nally (English: /ˈjuːlɪk/ YOO-lik) was a parish priest, who worked around 1680 - 1697.

== Background ==
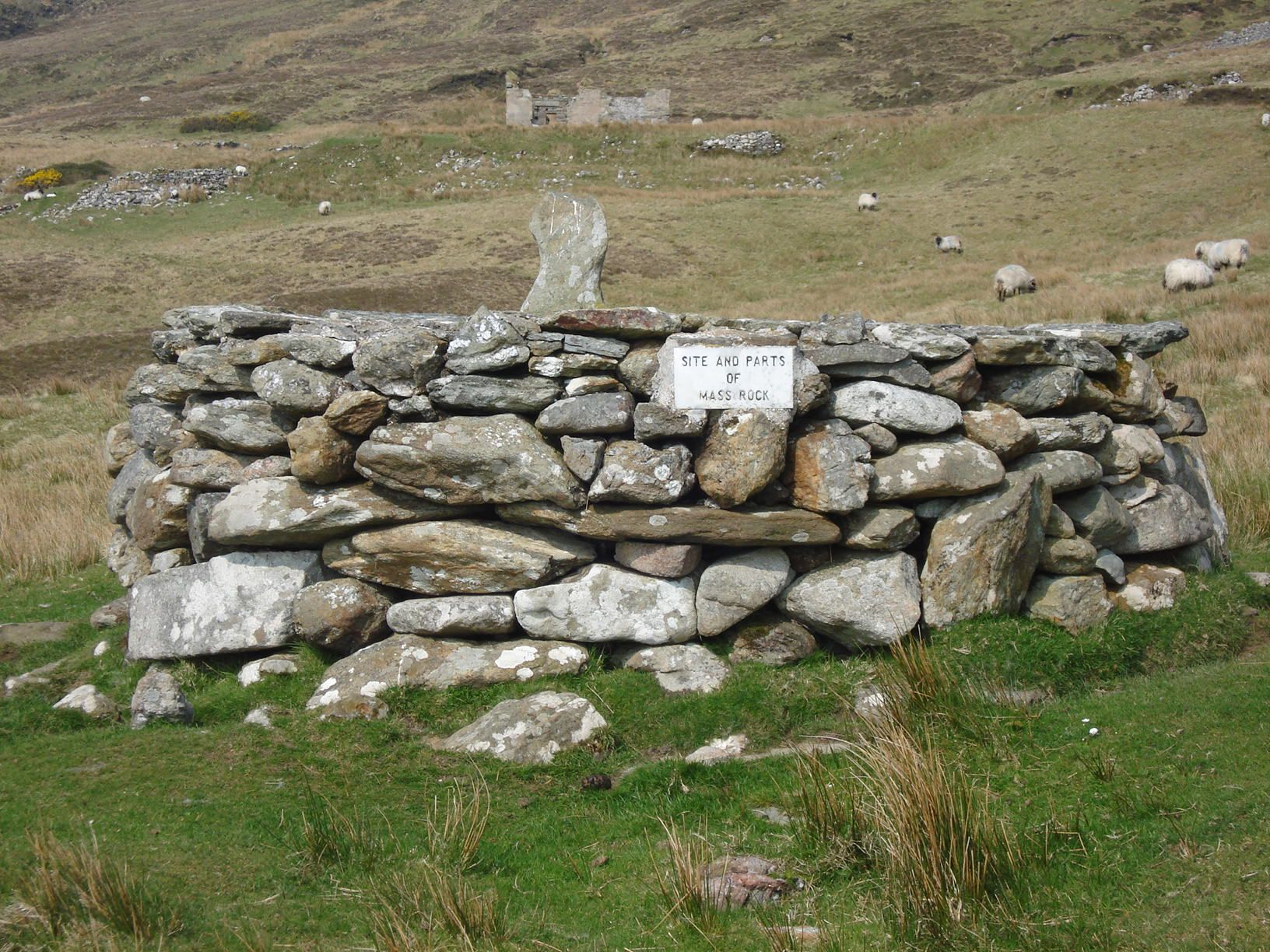
A mass rock, the like Fr. Nally would have used during Irish Penal Times when conducting mass in secret from authorities

Due to the impact of the Penal Laws on late seventeenth-century Ireland, Catholic priests who celebrated the mass could be hung and severe penalties, up to the death penalty, could be imposed upon those who supported priests. O'Conor of Sylane, Tuam, received a letter from a Catholic bishop recommending "a poor way-worn man in the gear of a servant" for a position in his house. Recognizing Nally as a priest, "O'Conor engaged him on the spot as a servant, taking care that there should be witnesses of the hiring for his own security." By these means, Nally became one of the few priests who worked without prosecution.

The base of the stone cross upon the mass rock reads "UN P.P. H O'CONOR 1680."
