= Frederick Spencer, 4th Earl Spencer =

British vice-admiral and politician (1798–1857)

Vice-Admiral The Right Honourable The Earl Spencer KG CB PC
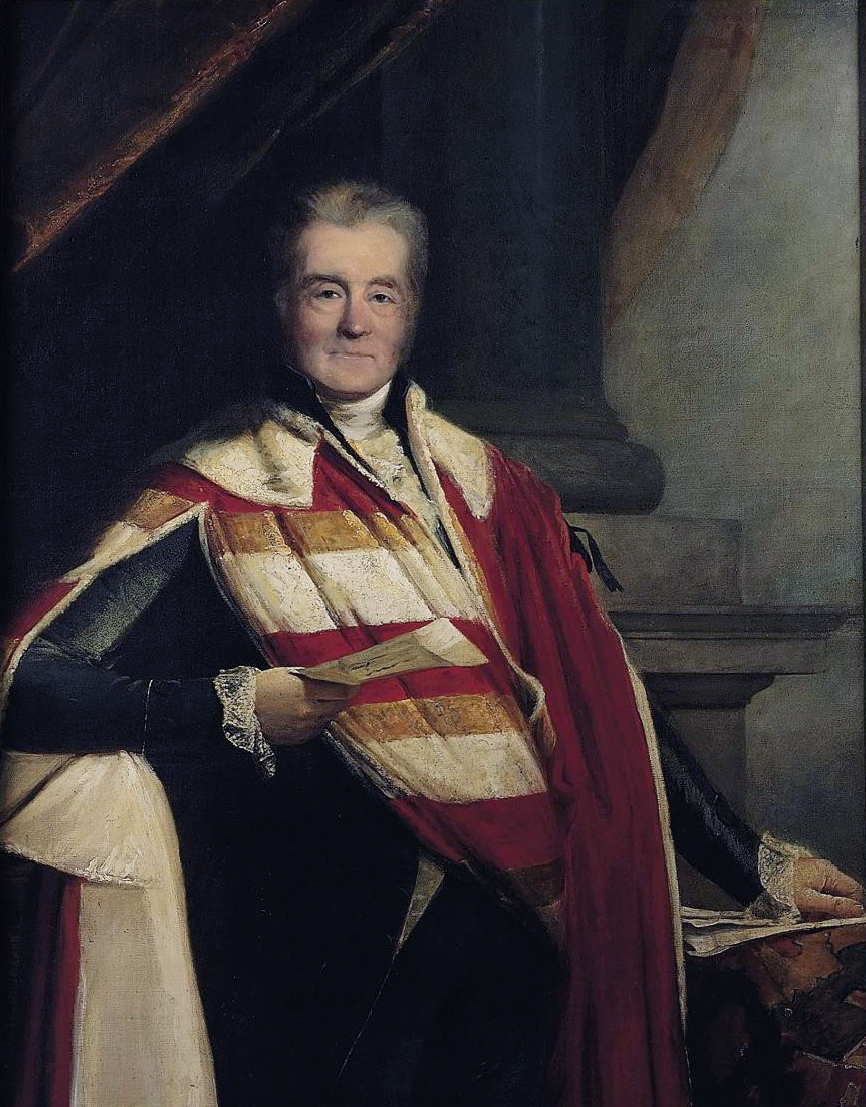
- The Earl Spencer by Stephen Catterson Smith.

Lord Chamberlain of the Household
- In office 8 July 1846 – 5 September 1848
- Monarch: Victoria
- Prime Minister: Lord John Russell
- Preceded by: The Earl De La Warr
- Succeeded by: The Marquess of Breadalbane

Lord Steward of the Household
- In office 10 January 1854 – 23 November 1857
- Monarch: Victoria
- Prime Minister: The Earl of Aberdeen; The Viscount Palmerston
- Preceded by: The Duke of Norfolk
- Succeeded by: The Earl of St Germans

Personal details
- Born: 14 April 1798 Admiralty Building Whitehall, London, England
- Died: 27 December 1857 (aged 59) Althorp, Brington, Northamptonshire, England
- Party: Whig
- Spouses: Georgiana Poyntz (m. 1830; died 1851) Adelaide Horatia Seymour (m. 1854)
- Children: Lady Georgiana Spencer; John Spencer, 5th Earl Spencer; Lady Sarah Spencer; Lady Victoria Mansfield; Charles Spencer, 6th Earl Spencer
- Parent(s): George Spencer, 2nd Earl Spencer; Lady Lavinia Bingham
- Education: Eton College

Military service
- Allegiance: United Kingdom
- Branch/service: Royal Navy
- Years of service: 1811–1831
- Rank: Vice-admiral
- Commands: HMS Alacrity; HMS Creole; HMS Talbot
- Battles/wars: Napoleonic Wars; Peninsular War; Siege of Tarragona; Greek War of Independence; Battle of Navarino; Morea Expedition

Vice-Admiral Frederick Spencer, 4th Earl Spencer, KG, CB, PC (14 April 1798 – 27 December 1857), styled The Honourable Frederick Spencer until 1845, was a British naval commander, courtier, and Whig politician. He initially served in the Royal Navy and fought in the Napoleonic Wars and the Greek War of Independence, eventually rising to the rank of Vice-Admiral. He succeeded his elder brother as Earl Spencer in 1845 and held political office as Lord Chamberlain of the Household between 1846 and 1848 and as Lord Steward of the Household between 1854 and 1857. In 1849, he was made a Knight of the Garter.

== Early life ==
Spencer was born on 14 April 1798 at the Admiralty Building, London, and was baptised in St Martin-in-the-Fields. He was the fifth child born to George Spencer, 2nd Earl Spencer, and Lady Lavinia Bingham. Among his siblings was older brothers John Spencer, 3rd Earl Spencer (whose wife died in childbirth) and Sir Robert Cavendish Spencer, who died unmarried at sea. His older sister Lady Sarah Spencer was the wife of William Lyttelton, 3rd Baron Lyttelton.

His paternal grandparents were Home Secretary John Spencer, 1st Earl Spencer, and his wife Margaret Georgiana Poyntz, daughter of the diplomat and courtier Stephen Poyntz. His maternal grandparents were Irish peer Charles Bingham, 1st Earl of Lucan, and his wife, the portrait miniature painter Margaret Smyth.

Spencer was educated at Eton from 1808 to 1811.

== Career ==
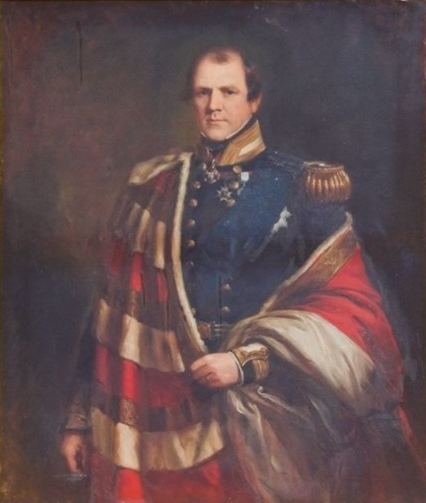
Portrait by Charles Allingham.

Spencer then joined the Royal Navy as a midshipman on 18 September 1811, and fought in the Napoleonic Wars in the Mediterranean between 1811 and 1815. He served for a time under his brother, Captain the Hon. Robert Cavendish Spencer as a lieutenant aboard his ship HMS Owen Glendower, before receiving his own command, that of the brig HMS Alacrity on the South America Station. He was promoted to the rank of post-captain on 26 August 1822.

During the Greek War of Independence he commanded HMS Talbot at the Battle of Navarino on 20 October 1827 and was appointed a Companion of the Order of the Bath in November of that year. The following year he fought with the Naval Brigade in the Morea expedition. For his actions he was made a Knight of the Order of St Louis of France and awarded the Order of St Anne of Russia and the Order of the Redeemer of Greece.

=== Political career ===
Spencer then retired from naval life and was elected Whig Member of Parliament for Worcestershire in 1831. He held this seat until 1832 and then represented Midhurst between 1832 and 1834 and again between 1837 and 1841. He was later an equerry in the household of the Duchess of Kent (Queen Victoria's mother) from 1840 to 1845. The latter year he succeeded his elder brother in the earldom and took his seat in the House of Lords.

When the Whigs came to power under Lord John Russell in 1846, Lord Spencer was appointed Lord Chamberlain of the Household. He was sworn of the Privy Council the same year. He resigned as Lord Chamberlain in 1848 but returned to the government as Lord Steward of the Household in early 1854 under Lord Aberdeen, a post he held until shortly before his death in 1857, the last two years under the premiership of Lord Palmerston. He was made a Knight of the Garter in 1849.

He was also promoted to Rear-Admiral in 1852. and to Vice-Admiral (on the reserve list) in 1857.

== Personal life ==
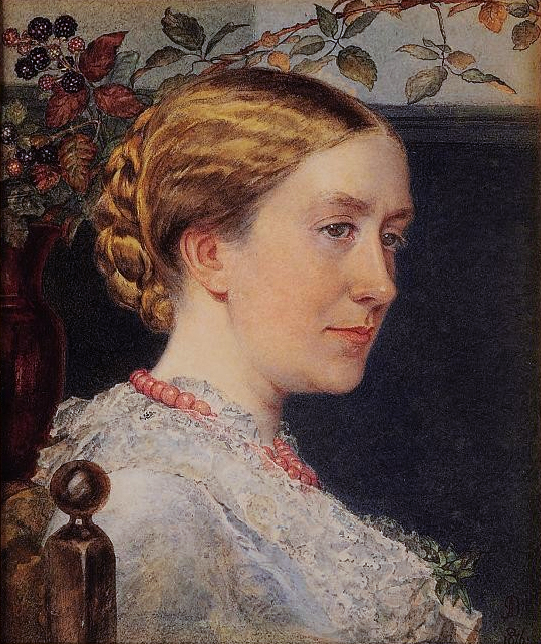
Lady Sarah Spencer (1838–1919)

Lord Spencer was twice married. He married firstly his second cousin, Georgiana Poyntz (1799–1851), daughter of William Stephen Poyntz on 23 February 1830. They had three children:

- Lady Georgiana Frances Spencer (1832–1852), who died unmarried.
- John Poyntz Spencer, 5th Earl Spencer (1835–1910), who married Charlotte Seymour, a granddaughter of Vice-Admiral Lord Hugh Seymour and a first cousin of his stepmother Adelaide Seymour.
- Lady Sarah Isabella Spencer (1838–1919), who died unmarried.

After Georgiana's death in 1851 he married, secondly, Adelaide Horatia Seymour (1825–1877), daughter of Sir Horace Seymour and a great-granddaughter of Francis Seymour-Conway, 1st Marquess of Hertford, on 9 August 1854. They had two children:

- Lady Victoria Alexandrina Spencer (1855–1906), who married William Mansfield, 1st Viscount Sandhurst, and had issue.
- Charles Robert Spencer, 6th Earl Spencer (1857–1922), who married the Hon. Margaret Baring, daughter of Edward Baring, 1st Baron Revelstoke.

Lord Spencer died at the family seat at Althorp, Brington, Northamptonshire, in December 1857, aged 59, and was succeeded in the earldom by his only son from his first marriage, John, who became a Liberal politician. Spencer's son from his second marriage, Charles, who succeeded in the earldom in 1910, was also a Liberal politician. The Countess Spencer died at Guilsborough, Northamptonshire, in October 1877, aged 52. Lord Spencer was Lady Diana Spencer's 2nd great grandfather.

== Coat of arms ==
Coat of arms of Frederick Spencer, 4th Earl Spencer
Coronet A Coronet of an Earl Crest Out of a Ducal Coronet Or a Griffin's Head Azure gorged with a Bar Gemelle Gules between two Wings expanded of the second Escutcheon Quarterly Argent and Gules in the 2nd and 3rd quarters a Fret Or over all on a Bend Sable three Escallops of the first Supporters Dexter: A Griffin per fess Ermine and Erminois gorged with a Collar Sable the edges flory-counterflory and chained of the last and on the Collar three Escallops Argent; Sinister: A Wyvern Erect on his tail Ermine similarly collared and chained Motto Dieu Defend Le Droit (God defend the right)

== Ancestry ==
Ancestors of Frederick Spencer, 4th Earl Spencer

8. The Hon. John Spencer
4. John Spencer, 1st Earl Spencer
9. Lady Georgina Carolina Carteret
2. George Spencer, 2nd Earl Spencer
10. Stephen Poyntz
5. Georgiana Poyntz
11. Anna Maria Mordaunt
1. Frederick Spencer, 4th Earl Spencer
12. Sir John Bingham, 5th Baronet, of Castlebar
6. Charles Bingham, 1st Earl of Lucan
13. Anne Vesey
3. Lady Lavinia Bingham
14. Sir James Smith
7. Margaret Smith
15. Grace Dyke

== See also ==
- O'Byrne, William Richard (1849). "Spencer, Frederick" . A Naval Biographical Dictionary . John Murray – via Wikisource.

Parliament of the United Kingdom
Preceded by Hon. Thomas Foley; Hon. Henry Lygon	Member of Parliament for Worcestershire; 1831–1832; With: Hon. Thomas Foley	Constituency abolished
Preceded by George Robert Smith; Martin Tucker Smith	Member of Parliament for Midhurst; 1832–1835	Succeeded by William Stephen Poyntz
Preceded by William Stephen Poyntz	Member of Parliament for Midhurst; 1837–1841	Succeeded by Sir Horace Seymour
Political offices
Preceded by The Earl De La Warr	Lord Chamberlain of the Household; 1846–1848	Succeeded by The Marquess of Breadalbane
Preceded by The Duke of Norfolk	Lord Steward of the Household; 1854–1857	Succeeded by The Earl of St Germans
Peerage of Great Britain
Preceded by John Spencer	Earl Spencer; 1845–1857	Succeeded by John Spencer
