= William Henry Lyttelton =

William Henry Lyttelton may refer to:

- William Lyttelton, 1st Baron Lyttelton (1724–1808), British peer, politician and colonial administrator
- William Lyttelton, 3rd Baron Lyttelton (1782–1837), English politician
- William Henry Lyttelton (1820–1884), Canon of Gloucester
