= William Henry Lyttelton (1820–1884) =

English Anglican priest and translator

The Reverend William Henry Lyttelton (1820 – 24 July 1884) was a priest in the Church of England from the Lyttelton family. He was the English translator of a number of works by the Swiss Protestant theologians Frédéric Louis Godet and Félix Bovet. He also published numerous sermons, lectures and addresses of his own, edited a devotional manual (Forms of Praise and Prayer), and wrote an essay on the geology and geography of Clent and its surroundings.

== Life ==
William Henry Lyttelton was the youngest of the three sons of the 3rd Baron Lyttelton (1782–1837) and Lady Sarah (née Spencer, 1787–1870), daughter of the 2nd Earl Spencer. His brothers were George William (1817–1876), later the 4th Baron, and Spencer (1818–1882), who became marshal of the ceremonies to the Royal Household. They also had two sisters, Caroline (1816–1902) and Lavinia (1821–1850).

He graduated with a Master of Arts (M.A.) degree from Trinity College, Cambridge. He then pursued a career in the Church of England, where he was ordained priest and was appointed rector of Hagley in 1847 by his father, with St John the Baptist as parish church. On 28 September 1854, he married Emily Pepys (1833–1877), the daughter of Henry Pepys (1783–1860), Bishop of Worcester. His niece, Lucy Lyttelton, then aged 13 and surprised at the news, described Emily in her diary as "charitable, young (21), amiable, humble, good-looking…". Emily died without issue in 1877, probably at the rectory. Under her husband's will, an Emily Lyttelton Fund was set up in 1884 in her memory for local nursing purposes.

William Henry Lyttelton later rose to the office of Canon of Gloucester Cathedral but remained rector of Hagley until his death. On 5 February 1880, he married, secondly, Constance Ellen Yorke (died 24 December 1920), daughter of Grantham Yorke, Dean of Worcester.

He died on 24 July 1884 at the age of 64, without issue, and was buried next to his first wife in the Lyttelton plot at St John the Baptist Church, Hagley.

== Works ==
As author

- "Physical Geography and Geology of the district", in William Harris, Clentine Rambles (Stourbridge, 1868)
- Scripture Revelations of the Life of Man after Death, and the Christian Doctrines of Descent into Hell, the Resurrection of the Body, and the Life Everlasting, with Remarks upon Cremation and upon Christian Burial (London, 1875; 3rd edition 1876)

As editor

- Forms of Praise and Prayer in the Manner of Offices (Oxford, 1869)

As translator

- Frédéric Godet, Biblical Studies (London, 1875, 1876, 1882)
- Frédéric Godet, Lectures in Defence of the Christian Faith (Edinburgh, 1881; 2nd edition 1883)
- Félix Bovet, Egypt, Palestine and Phoenicia: A Visit to Sacred Lands (London, 1882)

== Images ==
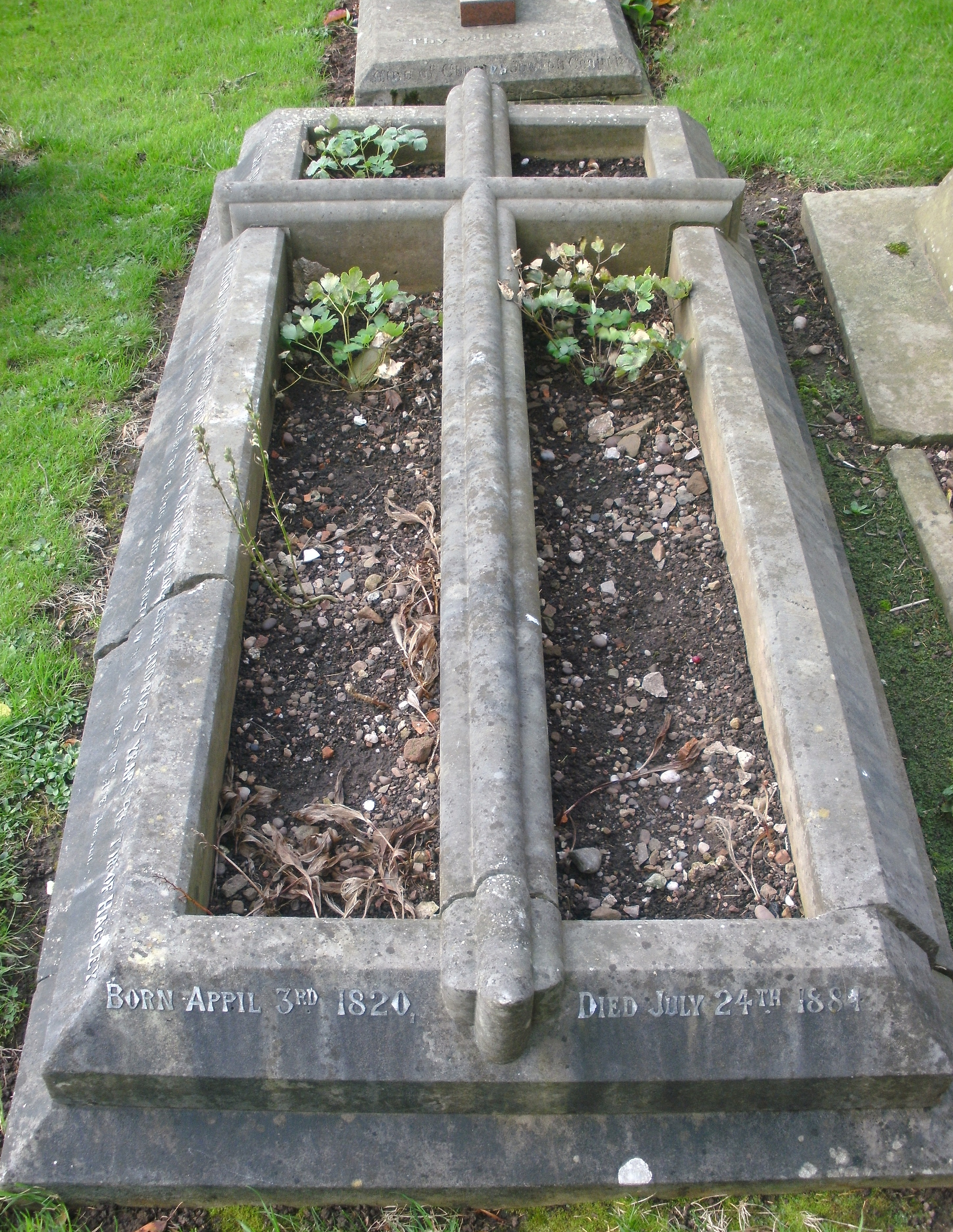
St John the Baptist Church, Hagley, grave of William Henry Lyttelton (1820–1884)

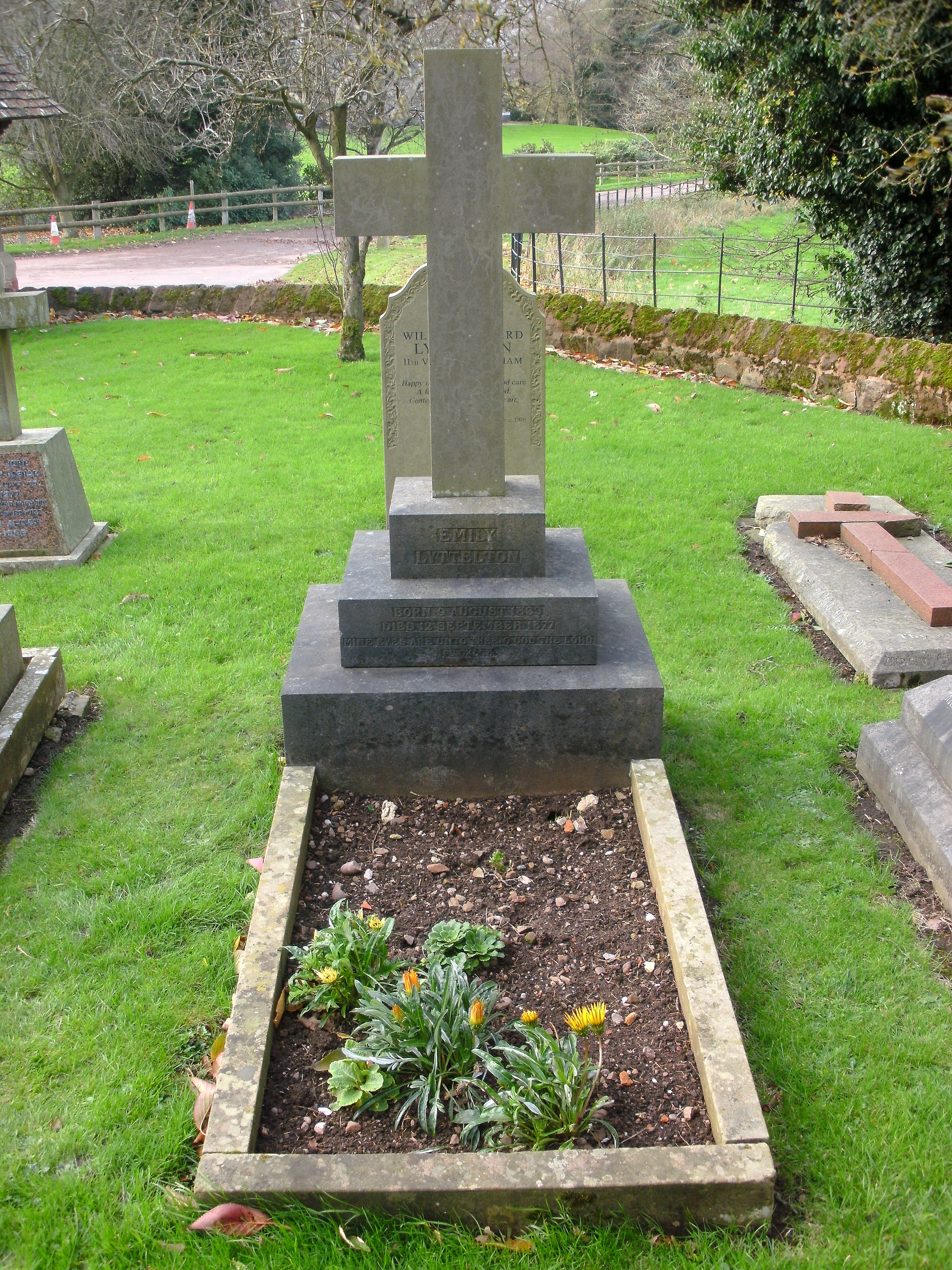
St John the Baptist Church, Hagley, grave of Emily Lyttelton (née Pepys, 1833–1877)

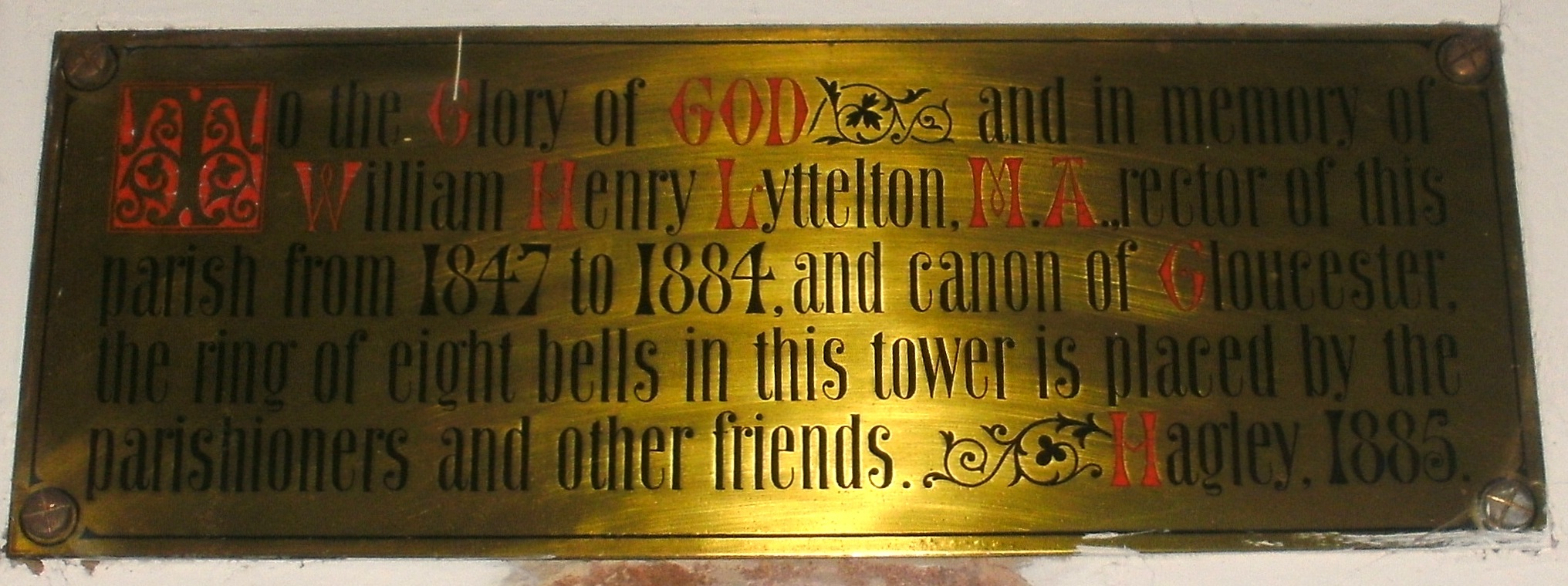
St John the Baptist Church, Hagley, brass tablet commemorating the dedication of the church bells to Canon William Henry Lyttelton (1820–1884)
