= William Lyttelton =

William Lyttelton may refer to:

- William Lyttelton, 1st Baron Lyttelton (1724–1808), British peer
- William Lyttelton, 3rd Baron Lyttelton (1782–1837), British peer
