= Emily Pepys =

English child diarist (1833–1877)

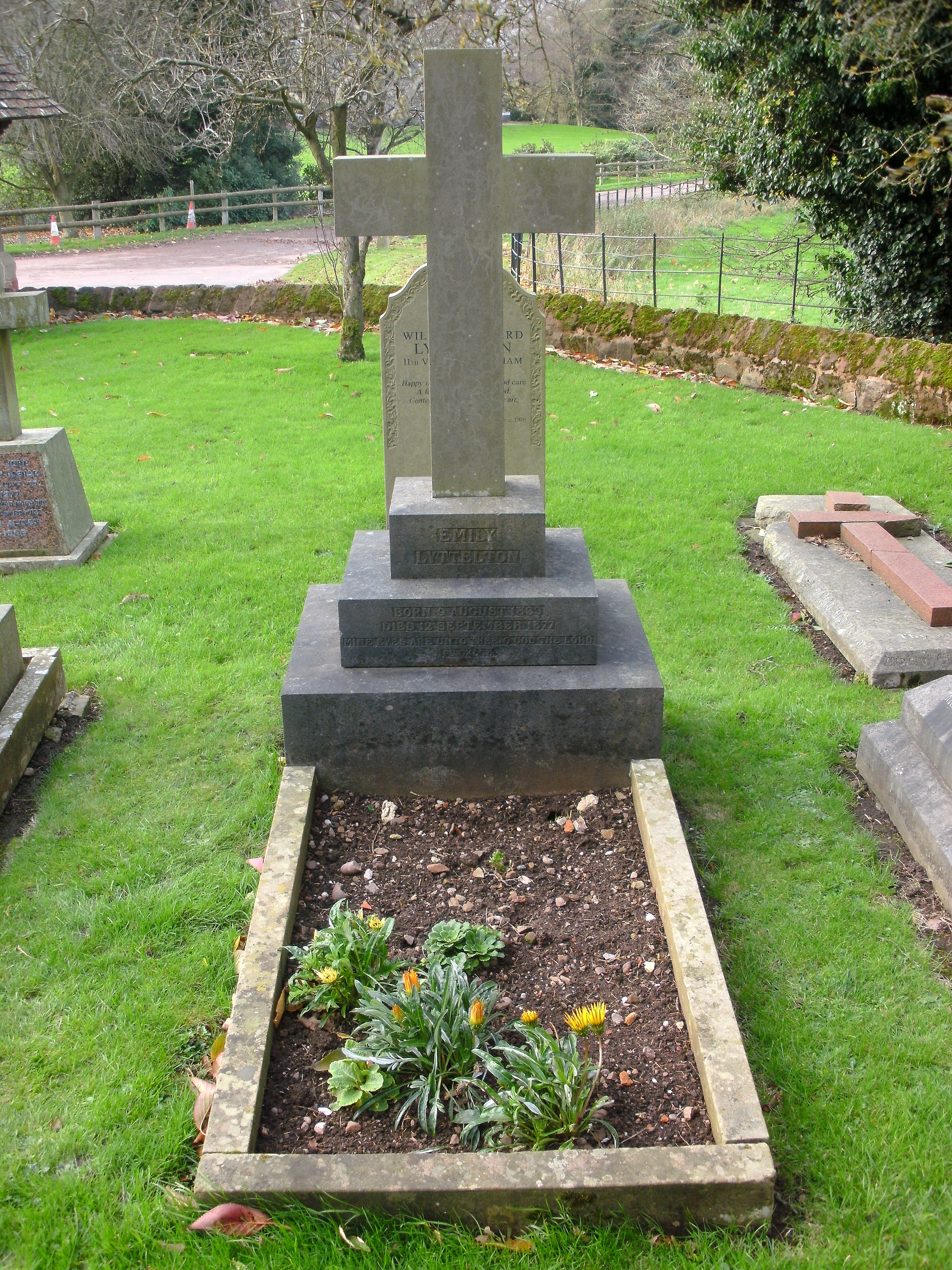
St John the Baptist Church, Hagley, grave of Emily Lyttelton (née Pepys, 1833–1877). She married Rev. William Henry Lyttelton (1820–1884), Canon of Gloucester, who is buried next to her.

Emily Pepys (9 August 1833 – 12 September 1877) was an English child diarist, whose account of six months of her life provides a vivid insight into a wealthy bishop's family. She was a collateral descendant of the diarist Samuel Pepys.

== Biography ==
Emily was born on 9 August 1833 at Westmill, Hertfordshire, where her father was rector at that time.

Her father, Henry Pepys (this branch of the family pronounced the name "peppis", not "peeps", 1783–1860), was created the Anglican Bishop of Sodor and Man in 1840 and translated only a year later to Worcester. He played a minor political role as a Liberal in the House of Lords. Her mother, Maria Pepys (1786–1885), was the daughter of John Sullivan, a privy councillor and a commissioner of the Board of Control.

Emily was the youngest of the four children who survived to adulthood, the others being Philip Henry (1824–1886), later registrar of the London Court of Bankruptcy, Maria Louisa (1827–1924), who would marry a well-connected Worcestershire parson, the Rev. Edward Winnington-Ingram, and Herbert George (1830–1918), who became vicar of the new parish of Hallow, Worcestershire.

Emily Pepys married the Hon. and Rev. William Henry Lyttelton (1820–1884), rector of Hagley, Worcestershire, and son of William Lyttelton, 3rd Baron Lyttelton, on 28 September 1854. His niece, Lucy Lyttelton, then aged 13 and surprised at the news, described Emily in her diary as "charitable, young (21), amiable, humble, good-looking...".

Emily died without issue on 12 September 1877, probably at Hagley Rectory. Under her husband's will, a Lady Emily Lyttelton Fund was set up in 1884 in her memory for local nursing purposes. She was a collateral descendant of the diarist Samuel Pepys and the niece of Charles Christopher Pepys, 1st Earl of Cottenham.

== Journal ==
The Journal of Emily Pepys itself takes up 60 printed pages – two pages of the manuscript are missing – and covers six months of 1844–1845 spent in the family home, Hartlebury Castle, the official residence of the Bishop of Worcester. It was written when Emily was ten. It found its way into the possession of a family called Nutt, but it is not known how. There it was discovered on a shelf in the family house by a 14-year-old girl, later Dee Cooper, who instigated its publication. As Gillian Avery points out in her introduction, it is all the more interesting and informative because it was not an assignment given by an adult, but a private diary containing "all the matters that are usually forgotten by the time the mature adult comes to write memoirs." The journal also featured in a 1991 American anthology of female English diary writings.

Emily is vocal and intelligent beyond her years; her journal is coherent and frank, giving a glimpse of busy life in a wealthy clerical family. Like many at that time, Emily was much concerned with moral values and matters of obedience and self-improvement. She is impressed by Charlotte Anley's popular didactic novel Influence...: "I think it did me a lot of good, the 'Ellen' there was so like me... Since I read that I have felt much happier" (15 July). She goes on to admit how she "began speaking crossly" when told she had to go to bed earlier. Other reading matter around that time included Martin Chuzzlewit, which was appearing in parts (18 July), and a ghost story called "White Lady", while out in the park with her sister Louisa (20 July). Later she chose The Pickwick Papers from a box of books that arrived from Cawthorn's circulating library, "as I know I may read that, and the others I may not read until Mama comes home."

Emily observes the courting behaviour of her elders and fancies herself in love with a cousin, Teddy Tyler, although he does not answer her letters. Two of Teddy's sisters come to stay again, but not the three boys: "In the evening Tiny (alias Maria) said, 'The boys send their love Emy, and hope you will write soon', though it is their turn over and over. I should like very much to have a little private letter from Teddy to show me his heart, and also I should like to see him again to revive my love" (7 August). Her cousins Harriet and Katey are more to her liking, except that "they spoilt my Harmonicon, and when I mended it, they would not leave off, so I was obliged to hide it" (30 July). The next day, as they leave: "I remember saying to Harriet, what fun it would be if Katey and [Emily's older brother] Herbert were to get in love though I do not think there is much chance on Herbert's side" (31 July).

Archery is a popular pursuit, but dancing is a mixed blessing: Robert (an older brother) "always makes me dance with those horrid Mr. Leas, who certainly do smell most dreadfully of snuff and tobacco. I danced a quadrille with young Percival, a very stupid long legged dull man. (I have just remembered that it was another dance I danced with Percival...) The second dance was a Polka, which I did not dance as Mama does not like us to dance it with gentlemen except brothers and cousins, though I do not see more harm in it than in a Galop" (21 August). She goes to some trouble to avoid being taken into supper by a leering, teasing Mr Talbot, but finds herself sitting next to him nonetheless.

Emily has regular lessons: "At present I do French exercises for ¾ hour, Maps 1 hour, Music 1¼, read French and English, ¾ hour, write French copy ½ hour. I like doing Maps very much; they are traced out, and one only has to put the names in and paint it. I have made this description in case I get married and have children it may be useful to them" (26 August), but alas, she was to die childless. She is amazed at how few books her mother had as a child. She accompanies her mother to the village school and on charitable visits to the poor. "I should very much like to buy something more for the poor people, but as I have not got a halfpenny at present it is impossible" (26 August). When she yields to her less sociable brother Herbert and they do not go to a county cricket match where she could meet her cousins, she is disappointed at getting no credit from her mother: "I am sorry to say I do a great many more things for the praise of Mama than for the love of God" (28 August).

The longest entry in the journal describes a fire in the small hours of Christmas Day, which has the family huddling in the hall in nightshirts and cloaks. "Fortunately the fire kept in the Schoolroom and so the Engines soon put it out. Papa went into the room... and nearly fell into the cellar or under the Schoolroom, as there had been a hole made in the floor, which he did not see, but somebody got him out as he was hanging by his hands... I never was in a house on fire before, and hope I never shall be again."

There is no explanation as to why the diary breaks off on 26 January, three days before her parents were due to dine and stay the night at nearby Witley Court with the Queen Dowager, Adelaide, and on the next day move up to their London house for the season. The Preface mentions that blank pages in the notebook had been left, and used later by a certain Arthur Nutt to write punishment lines ("Arthur Nutt is a good boy. A good boy is happy."), and by Dee Cooper's grandmother's great aunt, Polly Nutt, for shopping lists and diary entries of her own.

== External resource ==
There is a fine photograph of a lady named Emily Pepys on the website of a London gallery. This may depict the diarist, or possibly her namesake and cousin, Lady Emily Harriet Pepys (1829–1891), author of a pair of tales for young people. She appears as an older girl named Emy or Emie in the diary.
