= Henry Pepys =

English bishop (1783–1860)

The Right Reverend Henry Pepys
- Bishop of Worcester
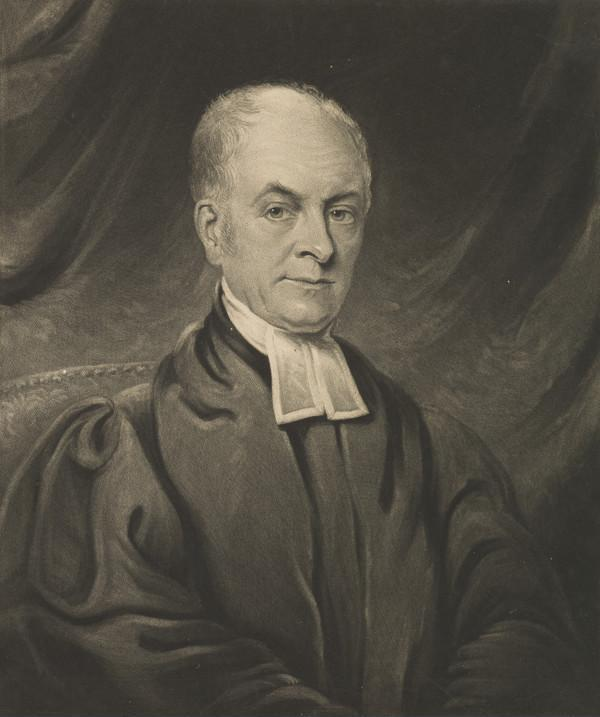
- Church: Church of England
- Diocese: Diocese of Worcester
- Elected: 1841
- Term ended: 1860 (death)
- Predecessor: Robert Carr
- Successor: Henry Philpott
- Other post: Bishop of Sodor and Man (1840–1841)

Personal details
- Born: 18 April 1783 Wimpole Street, London
- Died: 13 November 1860 (aged 77) Hartlebury Castle
- Buried: Hartlebury churchyard
- Denomination: Anglican
- Spouse: Maria Sullivan (m. 1824)
- Education: Harrow School
- Alma mater: Trinity College, Cambridge; St John's College, Cambridge

Henry Pepys (/pɛpɪs/; (Note: Pronounced "peppis", not "peeps" in this branch of the family. Gillian Avery: Introduction. In: The Journal of Emily Pepys (London: Prospect Books, 1984. ISBN 0-907325-24-6), p. 11.) 18 April 1783 – 13 November 1860) was the Church of England Bishop of Sodor and Man in 1840–1841 and of Worcester in 1841–1860. He gave generously to the Three Choirs Festival, held in Worcester every third year. His daughter Emily gained fame as a child diarist.

== Biography ==
Pepys was born in Wimpole Street, London, the son of Sir William Weller Pepys (1740/41–1825), 1st Baronet, a master in Chancery. They were descended from John Pepys, of Cottenham, Cambridgeshire, a great-uncle of Samuel Pepys the diarist. His elder brother was Charles Pepys, 1st Earl of Cottenham. Henry Pepys was educated at Harrow School and Trinity College, Cambridge, graduating BA in 1804. He then migrated as a fellow to St. John's College, Cambridge, proceeding to MA in 1807, BD in 1814, and DD in 1840.

Pepys was rector of Aspenden, Hertfordshire, from 12 June 1818 to 28 April 1827, and held with it the college living of Moreton, Essex from 16 August 1822 until 1840. On 3 February 1826 he was appointed a prebendary of Wells, and on 31 March 1827 rector of Westmill, Hertfordshire. On the recommendation of Viscount Melbourne he became Bishop of Sodor and Man on 27 January 1840, being consecrated at Whitehall on 1 March and arriving at Douglas, Isle of Man on 27 April. He was installed at St Mary's, Castletown, on 8 May. However, he left the island on 4 May 1841, on being translated to the see of Worcester.

In politics Pepys was a Liberal. He voted in favour of the chief Liberal measures and spoke in the House of Lords twice, on ecclesiastical questions of minor importance. Personally he was very popular and also conscientious in discharging his diocesan duties. He was a generous patron of the triennial Three Choirs Festival.

Pepys married, on 27 January 1824, Maria Sullivan, third daughter of Rt Hon. John Sullivan, commissioner of the Board of Control. She died on 17 June 1885, in her 90th year. Pepys died at Hartlebury Castle, Stourport, Worcestershire, on 13 November 1860. Four of their children lived to adulthood:

- Philip Henry Pepys (1824–1886), registrar of the London court of bankruptcy, who married Louisa Eleanor Anne Disbrowe
- Maria Louisa Pepys (born 1827), who married Rev. Edward Winnington-Ingram (1814–1891), rector of Stanford-on-Teme; her son was Arthur Winnington-Ingram, a future bishop of London.
- Herbert George Pepys (1830–1918), honorary canon of Worcester, who married Louisa Harriet Isaac
- Emily Pepys (1833–1877), a child diarist, who married Rev. Hon. William Henry Lyttelton

He died aged 77 and is buried at Hartlebury churchyard, where four other bishops of Worcester are buried.

== Publications ==
- The Remains of the late Viscount Royston, with a Memoir of his Life (London, 1838)
- Six charges (to the clergy or to ordinands of the diocese)
- Two single sermons

== Attribution ==
- This article incorporates text from a publication now in the public domain: "Pepys, Henry". Dictionary of National Biography. London: Smith, Elder & Co. 1885–1900.

Church of England titles
| Preceded by James Bowstead | Bishop of Sodor and Man; 1840–1841 | Succeeded by Thomas Vowler Short |
| Preceded by Robert Carr | Bishop of Worcester; 1841–1860 | Succeeded by Henry Philpott |
