= Charlotte Anley =

English didactic novelist and writer

Charlotte Anley (1796–1893) was an English didactic novelist and a writer on social and religious affairs. She was also a composer and a lyricist. As a Quaker, she spent the years 1836–1838 in Australia, researching for a report on women's prisons commissioned by Elizabeth Fry.

== Life ==
Anley's parents, place of birth on 17 February 1796 and education have not been traced. Her whereabouts through much of her life can only be surmised from indirect evidence.

The preface to the first edition of Influence is signed C. A., Forty Hill, Enfield, 9 February 1822. That of Miriam is also signed C. A., but from Newport, Isle of Wight, February 1826, and dedicated to Miss Curry of Clanville, a hamlet in North Hampshire. A "Miss C. Anley, Isle of Wight" features in the list of subscribers to an 1826 novel entitled Edward, attributed to the socially advanced author "The Duchess of Duras" (Claire de Duras) and translated from French. The 1853 edition ("second thousand") of Earlswood is signed from Sidcup, Kent, 12 June 1852, and bears a dedication to "The Right Honourable the Countess of Ellesmere and to her revered mother, the Lady Charlotte Greville", referring to the former, who can be identified as the wife of Francis Egerton, 1st Earl of Ellesmere, a politician and patron of the arts, as a "friend and benefactress". Lady Ellesmere lived at Hatchford Park, near Cobham, Surrey.

Before her departure for Australia, Anley was reported in the local almanac to be taking the waters at Carlsbad. While in Australia she is known to have spent 15 months as a governess to the prominent Dumaresq family. A modern scholar remarks, "Charlotte Anley, an English Quaker disciple of Elizabeth Fry, behaved in a warm and accepting way towards the most violent convict women at the Paramatta Factory. Their response is a most moving affirmation of the power of love." A historian of religion notes that Anley "was surprised and thankful for having been 'so well received and so patiently heard' at the factory in 1836. Protestants and Catholics alike listened with 'perfect attention' to the story of the prodigal son, they accepted religious tracts with 'apparent pleasure'."

Charlotte Anley died on 6 April 1893 in Bath, Somerset.

== Works ==
Anley's works include Influence. A Moral Tale for Young People (1822), still admired 20 years later by the child diarist Emily Pepys, Miriam, or The Power of Truth. A Jewish tale (1826), and Earlswood. A Tale for the Times, and All Time (1852).

Miriam was among a number of novels of the time dealing with Jewish conversion, in this case of an American girl, whom she transposes to Westmorland in the North of England. It was inspired by a report found by the author in The Cottage Magazine. In the words of a recent survey of women writers in that period, "Conversionists insist that modern Judaism erects its rituals as a last-ditch defense against what the Jews really suspect, namely, that the religion has lost its spiritual center. This claim is at work in Charlotte Anley's Miriam..., which features a fairly representative 'Jewish' argument in favor of ritual." The main female character of Earlswood departs from a Protestant Christian life for more ritualized Catholicism, but then realizes her mistake and thankfully returns to the former.

Anley's report on the conditions for female prisoners in Australia appeared in 1841. Her 48-page Essay on the Distinction between Body, Soul, and Spirit came out in the same year.

Anley also wrote verses and set them to music. Her works include The Harp of Bendemeer: a Ballad, . Other songs listed in the British Library are God Is Light. Hymn (1824), described at the time as "a pure and solemn composition," Rest Warrior... Song (c. 1825), Oh Think not that this Heart is Gay. A Song (c. 1825), and Sweet Bird Repeat that Strain (c. 1874).

== Works online ==
- Earlswood; or, Lights and Shadows of the Anglican church. A Tale for the Times Retrieved 3 July 2015
- Miriam; or, The Power of Truth. A Jewish Tale Retrieved 3 July 2015
- The Prisoners of Australia. A Narrative Retrieved 3 July 2015
