= Georgiana Spencer, Countess Spencer =

English philanthropist (1737–1814)

The Right Honourable The Countess Spencer
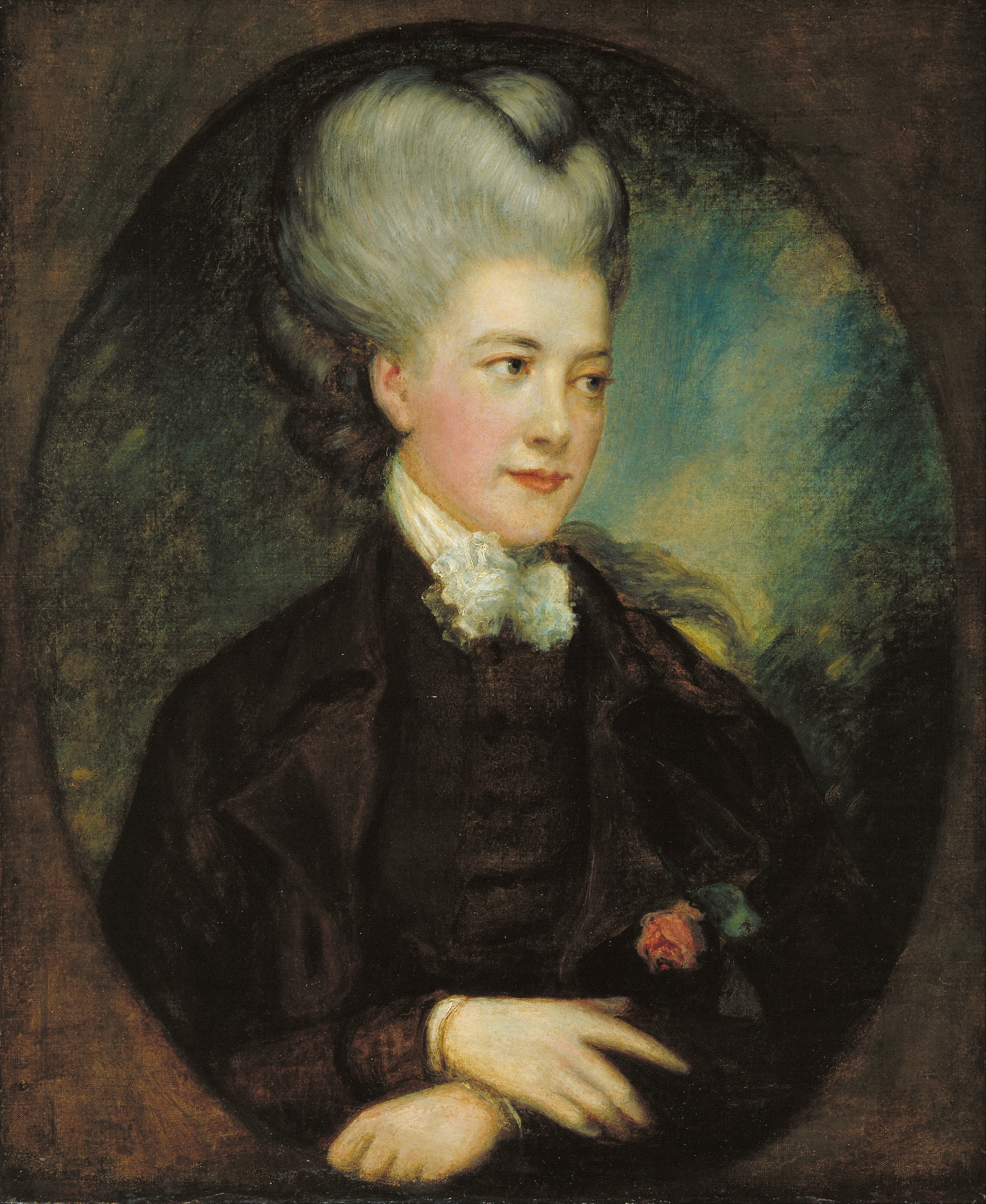
- Lady Spencer painted by Thomas Gainsborough.

Personal details
- Born: 8 May 1737 St James's Palace, London, England
- Died: 18 March 1814 (aged 76) St Albans, Hertfordshire, England
- Resting place: Brington, Northamptonshire
- Spouse: John Spencer, 1st Earl Spencer (m. 1755; died 1783)
- Children: Georgiana Cavendish, Duchess of Devonshire; George Spencer, 2nd Earl Spencer; Henrietta Ponsonby, Countess of Bessborough; Lady Charlotte Spencer; Lady Louisa Spencer
- Parent(s): Stephen Poyntz; Anna Maria Mordaunt

Margaret Georgiana Spencer, Countess Spencer (née Poyntz; 8 May 1737 – 18 March 1814), was an English philanthropist. She was born at St James's Palace as the daughter of a diplomat and a maid of honour to Caroline of Ansbach. In 1754, she married John Spencer, one of the wealthiest men of the era. A love match, the marriage resulted in the births of three surviving children, who included Georgiana Cavendish, Duchess of Devonshire. The Spencers became earl and countess in 1765, a reward granted by the Duke of Newcastle for John's political loyalty to the Whig party.

Lady Spencer was a noted philanthropist, and was in communication with a large network of charitable organisations. Her correspondence with a friend represents the largest private collection of letters in the British Library. Lord and Lady Spencer were generous patrons, and frequently hosted plays and concerts at their London estate, Spencer House, which they built in 1764.

== Early life ==
Margaret Georgiana Poyntz, known as Georgiana to her family, was born on 8 May 1737 at St James's Palace, the fourth surviving child of Stephen Poyntz and his wife, Anna Maria Mordaunt. Her diplomat father, the son of a successful linen draper (though distantly descended from the Poyntz family, an old landowning noble family), had been sent to Eton College as a boy to begin a career in society, and eventually became the steward to the young Duke of Cumberland's household and a Privy Councillor to King George II. Georgiana's mother, a maid of honour to Queen Caroline, was the daughter of Brigadier-General the Hon. Lewis Mordaunt and a granddaughter of Lord Mordaunt. Georgiana had four siblings, three brothers and one sister. Stephen Poyntz died when Georgiana was thirteen, leaving the family, never rich, in comfortable surroundings.

== Marriage ==
In 1754, seventeen-year-old Georgiana Poyntz met twenty-year-old John Spencer, who had inherited enormous wealth from his great-grandmother, Sarah Churchill, Duchess of Marlborough. She considered him "handsomer than an angel," and they felt an instant attraction for each other. She wrote to a friend, "I will own it, and never deny it that I do love Spencer above all men on Earth." Spencer was uncertain if he would have his family's approval for the match and opted to spend several months travelling until his twenty-first birthday, when their approval would no longer be necessary. On his return they recognised their love had persisted, and shortly after his birthday they married in a secret ceremony on 20 December 1755 at Althorp, the Spencer family seat in Northamptonshire. The ceremony, held in an upper bedroom, occurred during a ball held in Spencer's honour with five hundred guests in attendance.

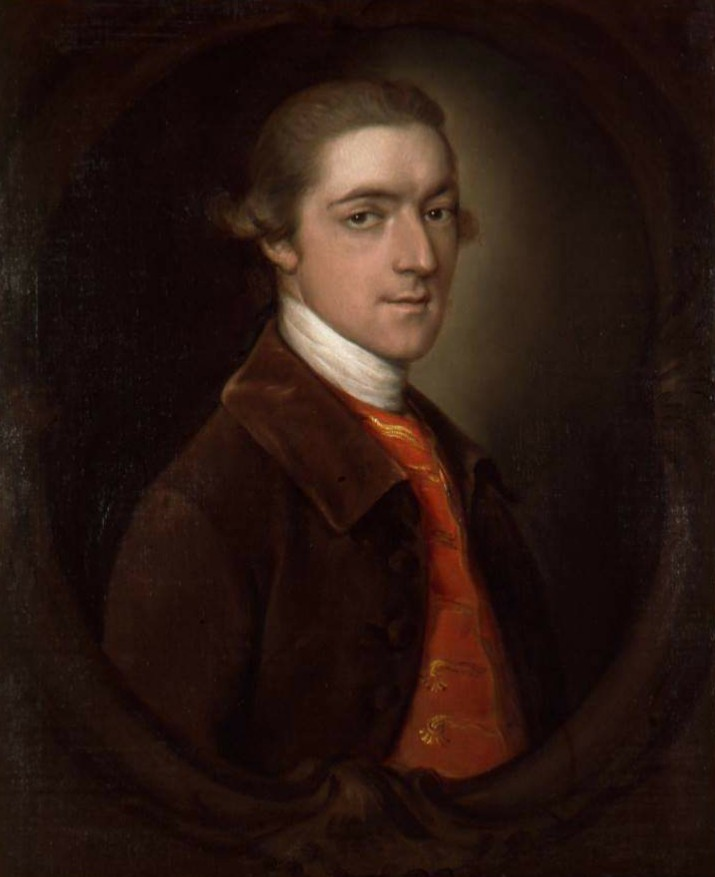
The Earl Spencer by Thomas Gainsborough

The marriage was made public five days later, and the couple was presented at court during the following year. Their early years together were happy, and their eldest child, Georgiana, was born in 1757 at Althorp. Georgiana preferred her firstborn, "Dear little Gee", to her younger children, George (born 1758) and Henrietta (born 1761). The Spencers owned many lavish estates, but preferred to reside at Althorp. In 1764, the family moved to their newly built London residence, Spencer House. Intended to be worthy of Spencer's large collection of antiquities, the lavish residence took seven years and £50,000 to build.

A Whig, in 1756 John entered the House of Commons as MP for Warwick, and in 1761 was awarded a viscountcy by the leader of the party, the Duke of Newcastle. Newcastle's party fell into opposition in 1762, and Spencer's loyalty was rewarded with an earldom on the duke's return to power in 1765.

The Spencers were generous patrons of writers and artists, and often hosted plays and concerts at Spencer House. According to biographer Donna T. Andrew, Lady Spencer was "exceptionally intelligent and well educated"; she was fluent in French and Italian, possessed some knowledge of Greek, and was "accomplished in botany." Her correspondence with the Hon. Mrs Howe "is reputed to be the largest single private collection of letters in the British Library." Lady Spencer was known as a philanthropist among her contemporaries, and was a founding member of the Ladies Society, "one of the first philanthropic organisations systematically to investigate the characters and circumstances of those who appealed to them for assistance." She communicated with philanthropists such as Jonas Hanway and charitable organisations, often advising them on how best to use the resources given to them.

== Widowhood and death ==
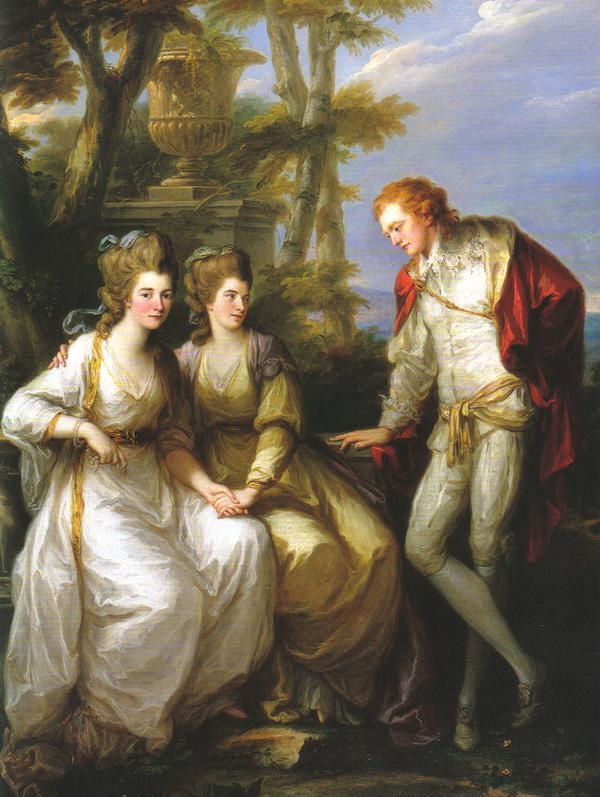
Lady Spencer's three surviving children, Georgiana, George, and Henrietta

A lifelong sufferer of ill-health, Lord Spencer died on 31 October 1783 in Bath at the age of 48. An extravagant man, he left their son with enormous debts, but, according to Richard Milward, also "greatly increased his family estates and its prestige by being the employer of leading architects, the collector of Italian paintings." Lady Spencer had liked to gamble but gave up the habit during her widowhood; she cautioned her daughters of the dangers of incurring large debts, although her warnings largely went unheeded.

In 1785, Henrietta gave birth to a daughter, Caroline. Lady Spencer stayed with them for ten days to help care for the child, finding that Caroline only slept when sleeping with her grandmother. Lady Spencer departed when she was satisfied that mother and daughter were "vastly well," although she often returned to visit the family. She took an active role in Caroline's upbringing. Lady Spencer died on 18 March 1814 at St. Albans, and was buried twelve days later at Brington, Northamptonshire.

== Family ==
With John Spencer, 1st Earl Spencer, Georgiana Poyntz had five children (including two daughters who died in infancy).

- Lady Georgiana Spencer (7 June 1757–1806), married William Cavendish, 5th Duke of Devonshire, and had issue.
- George John Spencer, 2nd Earl Spencer (1758–1834), married Lady Lavinia Bingham, daughter of Charles Bingham, 1st Earl of Lucan, and had issue.
- Lady Henrietta Frances Spencer (1761–1821), married Frederick Ponsonby, 3rd Earl of Bessborough, and had issue.
- Lady Charlotte Spencer (1765–1766), died in infancy.
- Lady Louisa Spencer (4 April 1769–17 April 1769), died in infancy.
