= Margaret Bingham, Countess of Lucan =

English painter and poet (1740–1814)

The Right Honourable The Countess of Lucan
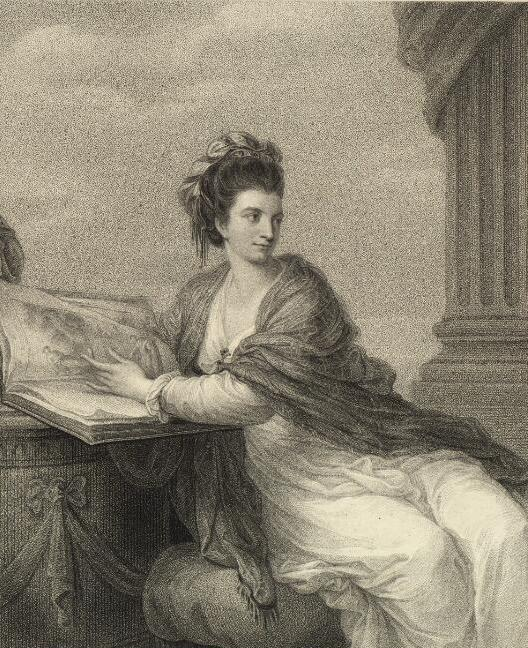
- Margaret Bingham (née Smith), Countess of Lucan, 1820
- Born: Margaret Smyth; 1740; Devon, England
- Died: 27 February 1814 (aged 73–74); London, England
- Spouse: Charles Bingham, 1st Earl of Lucan
- Issue: Lavinia Spencer, Countess Spencer; Lady Eleanor Bingham; Lady Louisa Bingham; Lady Anne Bingham; Richard Bingham, 2nd Earl of Lucan
- Parents: James Smith; Grace Smith

Margaret Bingham, Countess of Lucan (1740 – 27 February 1814) was an English painter, copyist and poet, whose art was much admired by Horace Walpole. Her pseudonymous Verses on the Present State of Ireland made a strong protest against Britain's treatment of the country.

== Personal life ==
Margaret Bingham was born Margaret Smyth in Devon, England, the younger of the two daughters of James Smith MP of Canons' Leigh, Devon, and his wife Grace. In 1760, she married Charles Bingham, later 1st Earl of Lucan. She died in 1814 at St James's Place in London and was survived by five children:

- Lady Lavinia Bingham, who married George Spencer, 2nd Earl Spencer and had issue,
- Lady Eleanor Margaret Bingham,
- Lady Louisa Bingham,
- Lady Anne Bingham, and
- Hon. Richard Bingham, who succeeded his father in the title.

== Work ==
As an artist, Bingham often copied the work of others, as well as painting portrait miniatures. Her work was collected in the United Kingdom and in France. In Paris she was given access to the Palais-Royal to copy pieces by the artists on display there, which were owned by the Duke of Orléans.

Bingham's foremost work was to supply miniatures and illuminations for a five-volume edition of Shakespeare's historical plays, for the library at Althorp, Northamptonshire. This took 16 years for her to complete. She also painted portraits, still lifes, and landscapes.

Bingham was admired by Horace Walpole, who makes several flattering allusions to her in his letters. In his Anecdotes he attributes to her "a genius that almost depreciates those masters [from whom she copied], when we consider that they spent their lives in attaining perfection."

As a writer, Lady Lucan published in about 1778 Verses on the Present State of Ireland, a strong poetic protest against Britain's treatment of Ireland. It was published in Dublin under the pseudonym Lady L–n. A bibliography of her writings appeared in 1990.
