= Lavinia Spencer, Countess Spencer =

British artist (1762–1831)

The Right Honourable The Countess Spencer
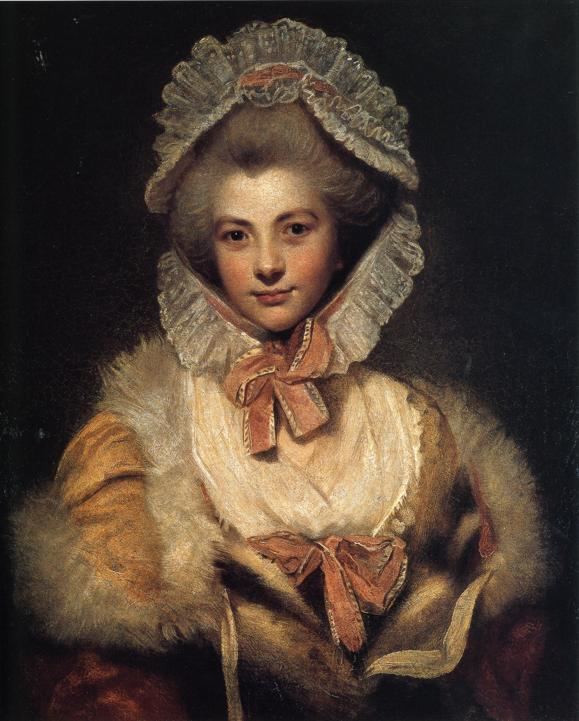
- Lavinia, Countess Spencer by Joshua Reynolds
- Born: Lavinia Bingham; 27 July 1762
- Died: 08 June 1831 (aged 68)
- Spouse: George Spencer, 2nd Earl Spencer
- Issue: John Spencer, 3rd Earl Spencer; Sarah Lyttelton, Baroness Lyttelton; Hon. Richard Spencer; Sir Robert Cavendish Spencer; Georgiana Charlotte, Lady George Quin; Frederick Spencer, 4th Earl Spencer; Ignatius Spencer
- Parents: Charles Bingham, 1st Earl of Lucan; Margaret Smyth
- Occupation: Illustrator

Lavinia Spencer, Countess Spencer (née Bingham; 27 July 1762 – 08 June 1831) was a British illustrator.

== Early life and family ==
Born in 1762, Lady Lavinia Bingham was the eldest daughter of the Irish peer Charles Bingham, 1st Earl of Lucan and his wife, the portrait miniature painter Margaret Smyth. She had three sisters and one brother, Richard.

== Marriage and issue ==
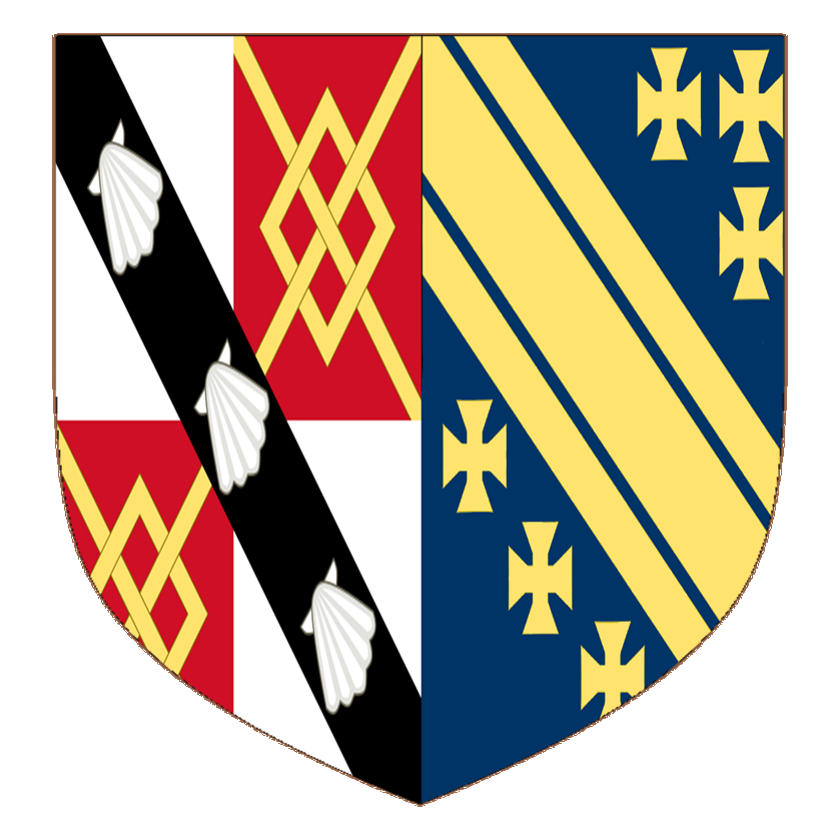
Spencer impaling Bingham

Despite the lack of a dowry, George Spencer, Viscount Althorp fell "out of his senses" with Lavinia and offered her marriage. His parents Lord and Lady Spencer permitted the match, perceiving that Lavinia was pretty, intelligent, and morally acceptable. The young couple married on 6 March 1782, and had nine children:

- John Charles Spencer, 3rd Earl Spencer (1782–1845)
- Lady Sarah Spencer (1787–1870), married William Lyttelton, 3rd Baron Lyttelton, and had issue. She became governess to the children of Queen Victoria.
- Hon. Richard Spencer (1789–1791), died in infancy.
- Captain Hon. Sir Robert Cavendish Spencer (1791–1830), died unmarried at sea.
- Lady Harriet Spencer (b. & d. 1793), died in infancy.

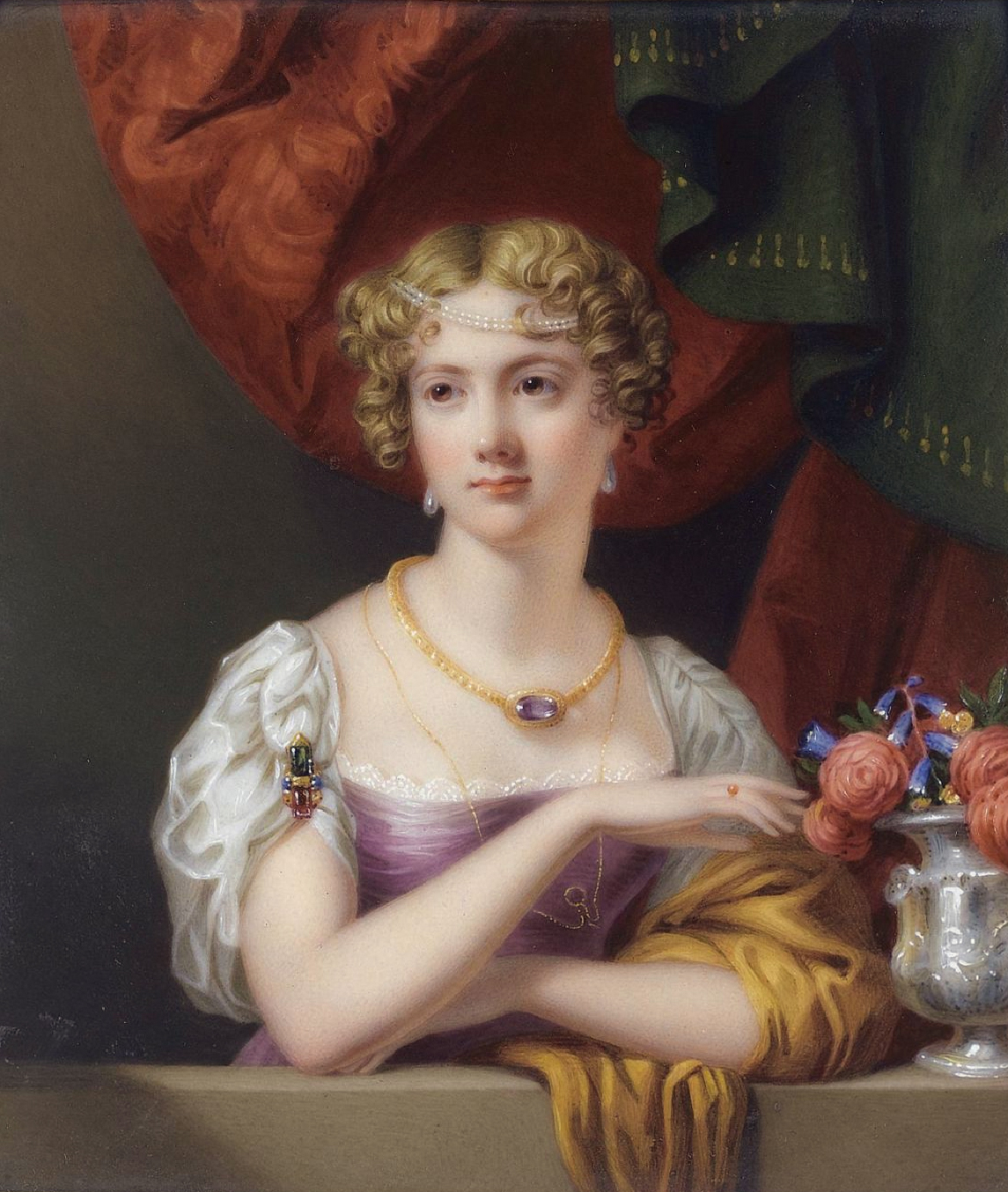
Georgiana Charlotte (Henry Pierce Bone)

- Lady Georgiana Charlotte Spencer (1794–1823), married Lord George Quin, son of Thomas Taylour, 1st Marquess of Headfort, and had issue.
- Vice-Admiral Frederick Spencer, 4th Earl Spencer (1798–1857)
- The Very Reverend Hon. George Spencer (later known as Father Ignatius Spencer (1799–1864), died unmarried.

A rising politician, Althorp succeeded his father as the 2nd Earl Spencer in 1783. Earl and Countess Spencer resided at Althorp and Spencer House, London, eventually producing eight children. They entertained the era's most prominent political and intellectual leaders.

The historian Malcolm Lester describes her as "a strong-minded and strong-willed woman of great erudition and charm [who] was perhaps the pre-eminent hostess in London society". The biographer Amanda Foreman, however, details less attractive traits, describing her as "moody, vindictive, hypocritical" and "neurotically jealous" of her sisters-in-law the Duchess of Devonshire and the Countess of Bessborough and "a calm liar who maintained a veneer of politeness to her in-laws while freely abusing them in conversation elsewhere."

== Works ==
Her drawing A Pinch of Snuff was included in the 1905 book Women Painters of the World. She is known for engravings made after her drawings by the engraver Mariano Bovi.

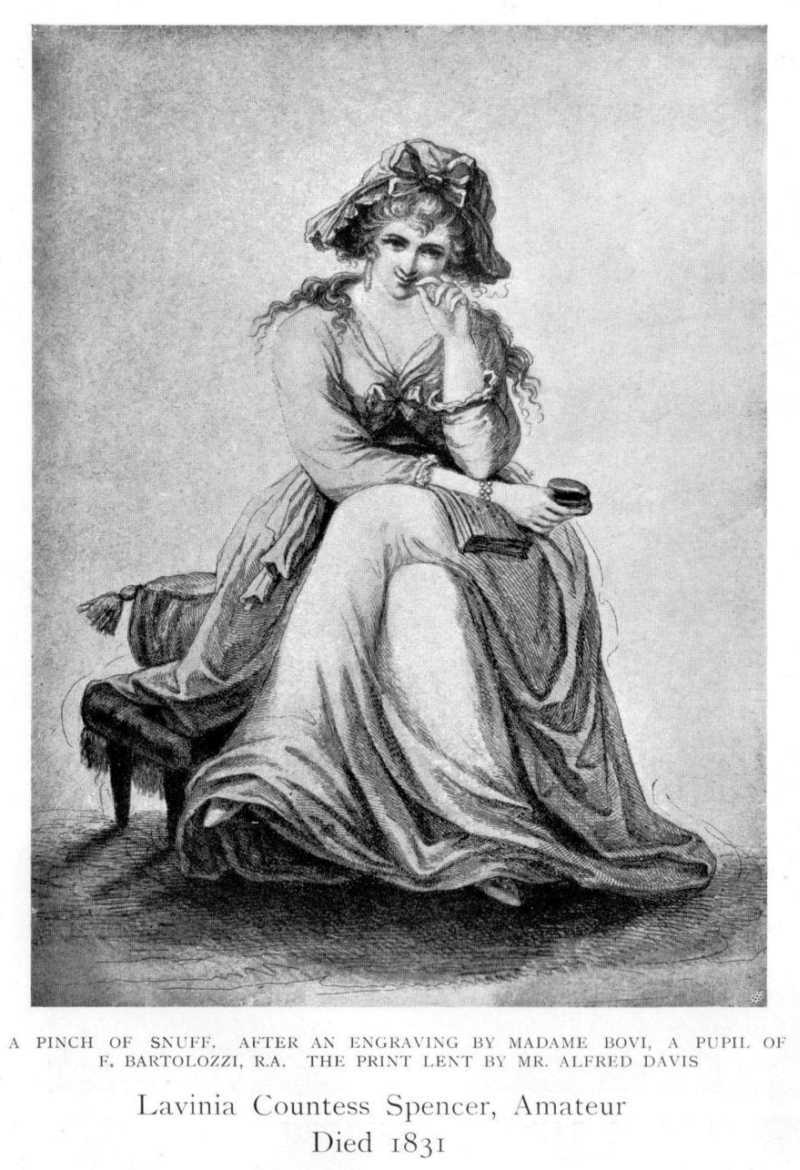
A Pinch of Snuff

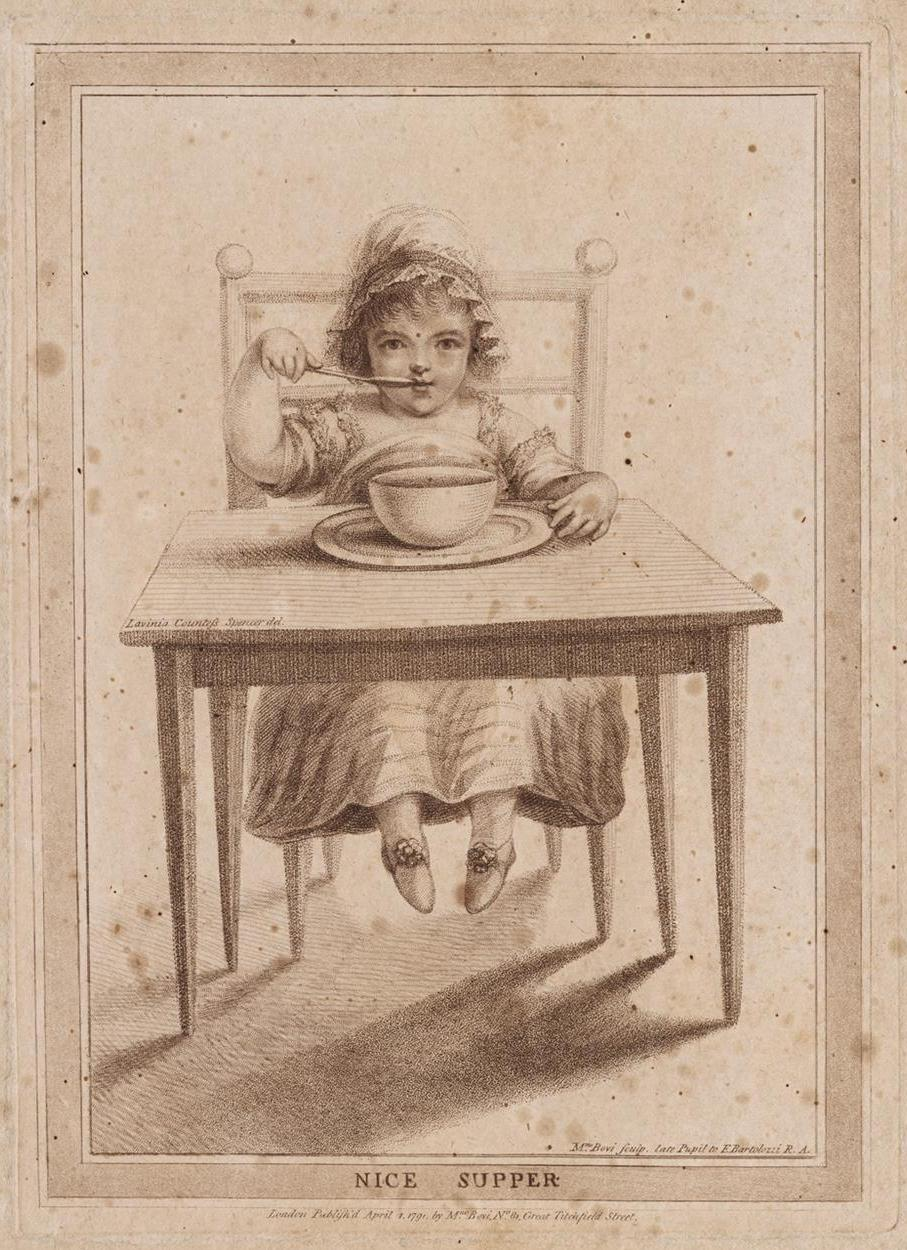
Nice Supper, engraved by Bovi

== Works cited ==
- Foreman, Amanda (1998). Georgiana: Duchess of Devonshire. Random House. ISBN 0375502947.
- Lester, Malcolm (2004). "Spencer, George John, second Earl Spencer (1758–1834)". Oxford Dictionary of National Biography (online ed.). Oxford University Press. doi:10.1093/ref:odnb/26125. (Subscription, Wikipedia Library access or UK public library membership required.)
- Lodge, Edmund (1849). The Peerage of the British Empire as at Present Existing. Saunders & Otley.
- Radford, Ernest (2004). "Bingham, Margaret, countess of Lucan (c.1740–1814)". Oxford Dictionary of National Biography (online ed.). Oxford University Press. doi:10.1093/ref:odnb/2411. (Subscription, Wikipedia Library access or UK public library membership required.)
