= George Spencer, 2nd Earl Spencer =

British politician (1758–1834)

The Right Honourable The Earl Spencer KG PC DL FRS FSA
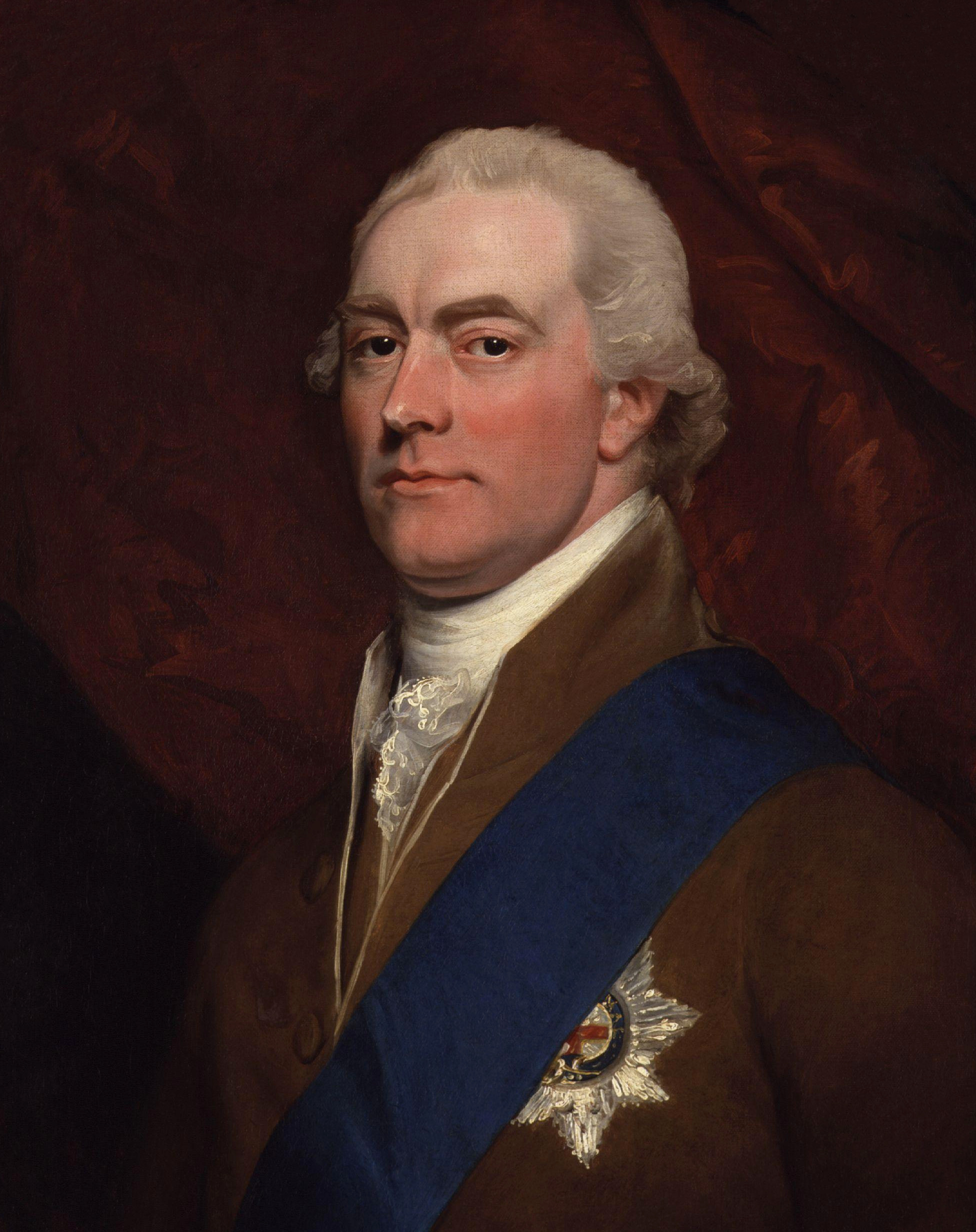
- Portrait by John Singleton Copley, 1800

Home Secretary
- In office 5 February 1806 – 25 March 1807
- Monarch: George III
- Prime Minister: The Lord Grenville
- Preceded by: The Lord Hawkesbury
- Succeeded by: The Lord Hawkesbury

First Lord of the Admiralty
- In office December 1794 – January 1801
- Monarch: George III
- Prime Minister: Pitt the Younger
- Preceded by: John Pitt
- Succeeded by: Earl St Vincent

Personal details
- Born: 1 September 1758 London, England
- Died: 10 November 1834 (aged 76) Althorp, Northamptonshire, England
- Party: Whig
- Spouse: Lady Lavinia Bingham (m. 1781; died 1831)
- Children: John Spencer, 3rd Earl Spencer; Sarah Lyttelton, Baroness Lyttelton; Hon. Richard Spencer; Robert Cavendish Spencer; Hon. William Spencer; Lady Harriet Spencer; Lady Georgiana Quin; Frederick Spencer, 4th Earl Spencer; Father Ignatius Spencer
- Parents: John Spencer, 1st Earl Spencer; Margaret Georgiana Poyntz
- Education: Trinity College, Cambridge

George John Spencer, 2nd Earl Spencer, KG, PC, DL, FRS, FSA (1 September 1758 – 10 November 1834), styled Viscount Althorp from 1765 to 1783, was a British Whig politician. He served as Home Secretary from 1806 to 1807 in the Ministry of All the Talents. He was also the father of the Venerable Father Ignatius of St Paul, a Roman Catholic convert to the priesthood.

== Background and education ==
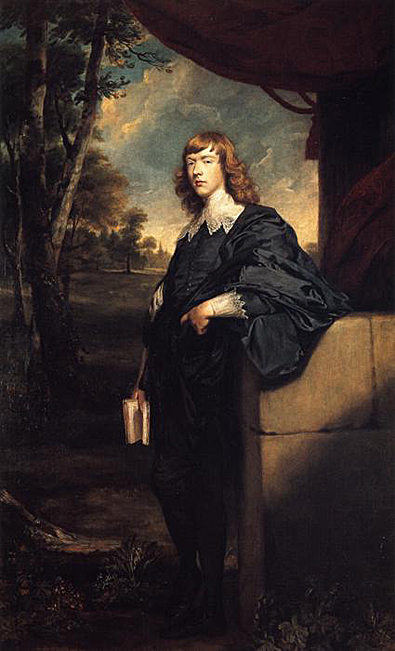
George John Spencer, 2nd Earl Spencer, portrait in oil by Joshua Reynolds, 1774 - 1776

Lord Spencer was born at Wimbledon Park House, London, the son of John Spencer, 1st Earl Spencer, and his wife Margaret Georgiana Poyntz, daughter of Stephen Poyntz, and was baptised there on 16 October 1758. His godparents were King George II, the Earl Cowper (his grandmother's second husband) and his great-aunt the Dowager Viscountess Bateman.

His sister Lady Georgiana Spencer married the Duke of Devonshire and became a famed Whig hostess. He was educated at Harrow School from 1770 to 1775 and he won the school's Silver Arrow (an archery prize) in 1771. He then attended Trinity College, Cambridge, from 1776 to 1778 and graduated with a Master of Arts. He acceded to the earldom on the death of his father in 1783.

== Political career ==
Lord Spencer was Whig Member of Parliament for Northampton from 1780 to 1782 and Whig MP for Surrey from 1782 to 1783. He was sworn of the Privy Council in 1794 and served under William Pitt the Younger as Lord Privy Seal in 1794 and as First Lord of the Admiralty from 1794 to 1801. In this capacity, he was central to the state's response to the 1797 mutinies at Spithead and the Nore. He was later Home Secretary from 1806 to 1807 under Lord Grenville in the Ministry of All the Talents.

== Other public positions ==
Lord Spencer was also High Steward of St Albans from 1783 to 1807, Mayor of St Albans in 1790, President of the Royal Institution from 1813 to 1825 and Commissioner of the Public Records in 1831. He became a Fellow of the Royal Society in 1780 and a Fellow of the Society of Antiquaries of London in 1785. He was appointed to the Order of the Garter in 1799. On 18 February 1793, he was appointed a deputy lieutenant of Northamptonshire.

== Book collecting ==
Spencer was known for an interest in literature, particularly early examples of printing. He was the instigator and first President of the exclusive, bibliophilic Roxburghe Club founded in 1812.

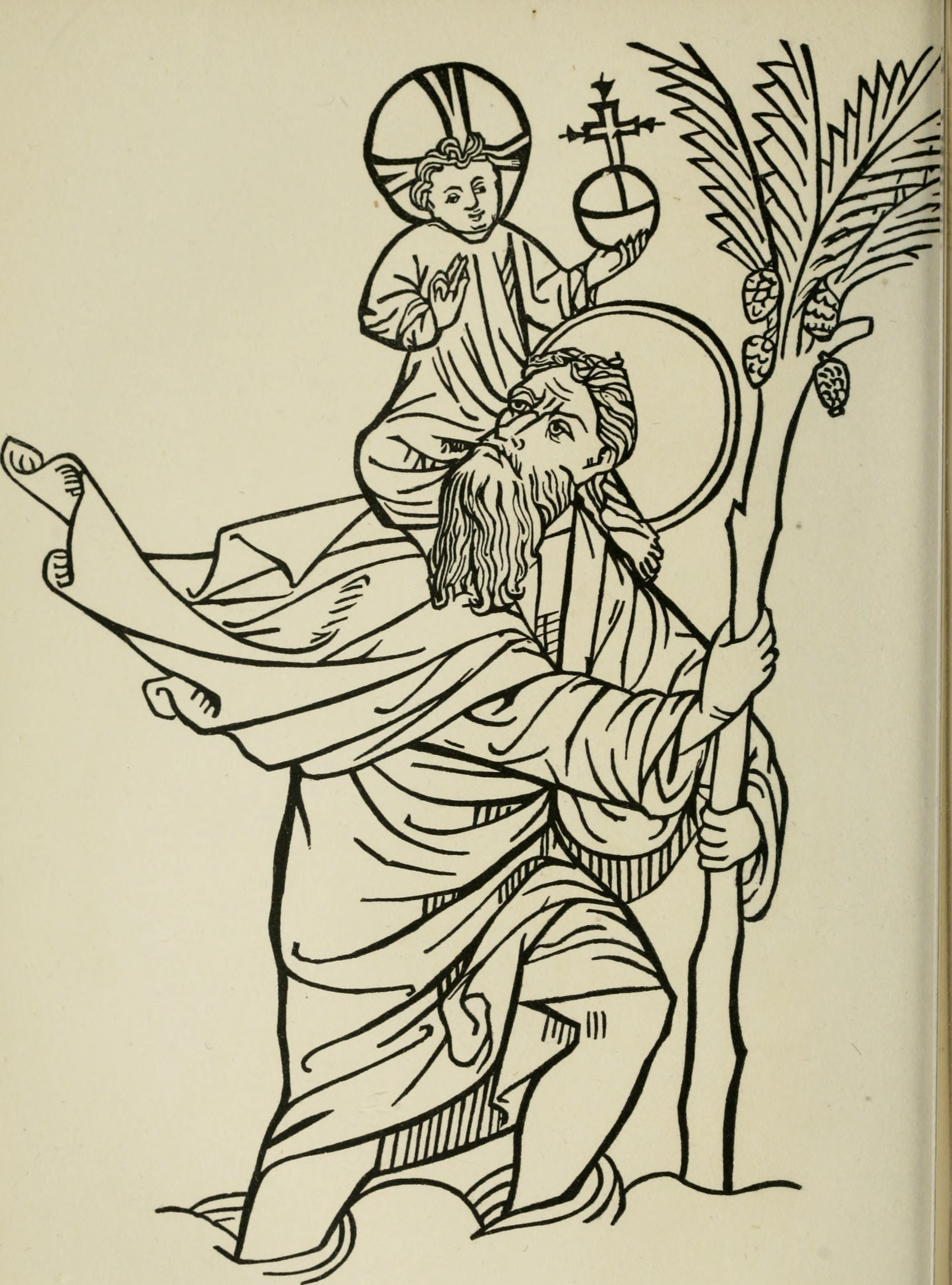
The St Christopher blockprint, dated 1423

Spencer's tens of thousands of volumes included the most nearly complete collection of Aldine editions ever brought together. It was acquired in 1892 by Enriqueta Rylands for the John Rylands Library and catalogued by Alice Margaret Cooke. The manuscripts of Spencer's collection are relatively few; one has pasted into it a St Christopher block print dated 1423.

From 1789 to 1818 Earl Spencer employed Tomaso d'Ocheda, an Italian, as his librarian; he had until 1789 been the librarian of Pierre-Antoine Bolongaro-Crevenna.

When Napoleon was in the process of the secularization of religious houses in southern Germany, Spencer used the local British agent and Benedictine monk, Alexander Horn, to acquire many of their rare books and manuscripts.

Rev. Thomas Frognall Dibdin, a Church of England clergyman and bibliographer, wrote the first of many bibliographical works: Introduction to the Knowledge of Editions of the Classics (1802), which brought him to the notice of Earl Spencer, to whom he owed important aid in his bibliographical pursuits. The rich library at Althorp was thrown open to him; he spent much time there and in 1814–1815 published Bibliotheca Spenceriana. As the library was not open to the public, the information was found useful, but as its author was unable even to read the characters in which the books he described were written, it was marred by errors, as were almost all his productions. In 1818 Dibdin was commissioned by Earl Spencer to buy books for him on the continent, an expedition described in his sumptuous Bibliographical, Antiquarian and Picturesque Tour in France and Germany (1821). He also wrote Aedes Althorpianae, an account of Althorp giving many details of the library.

== Family ==
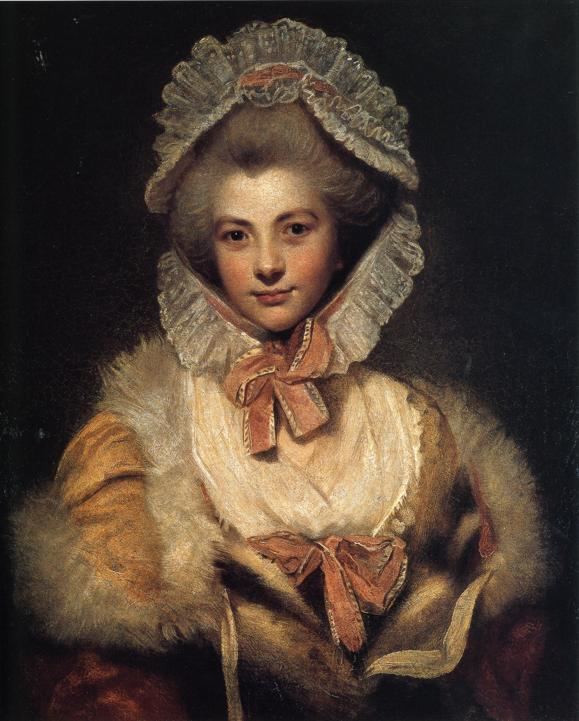
Lady Lavinia Bingham, 1781 (Joshua Reynolds)

Lord Spencer married Lady Lavinia Bingham (1762–1831), daughter of Charles Bingham, 1st Earl of Lucan, on 6 March 1781. They had nine children:

- John Charles Spencer, 3rd Earl Spencer (1782–1845)
- Lady Sarah Spencer (1787–1870), who married William Lyttelton, 3rd Baron Lyttelton, and had issue
- Hon. Richard Spencer (1789–1791) died in infancy.
- Captain Hon. Sir Robert Cavendish Spencer (1791–1830), died unmarried at sea.
- Hon. William Spencer (born and died 1792), died in infancy.
- Lady Harriet Spencer (born and died 1793), died in infancy.

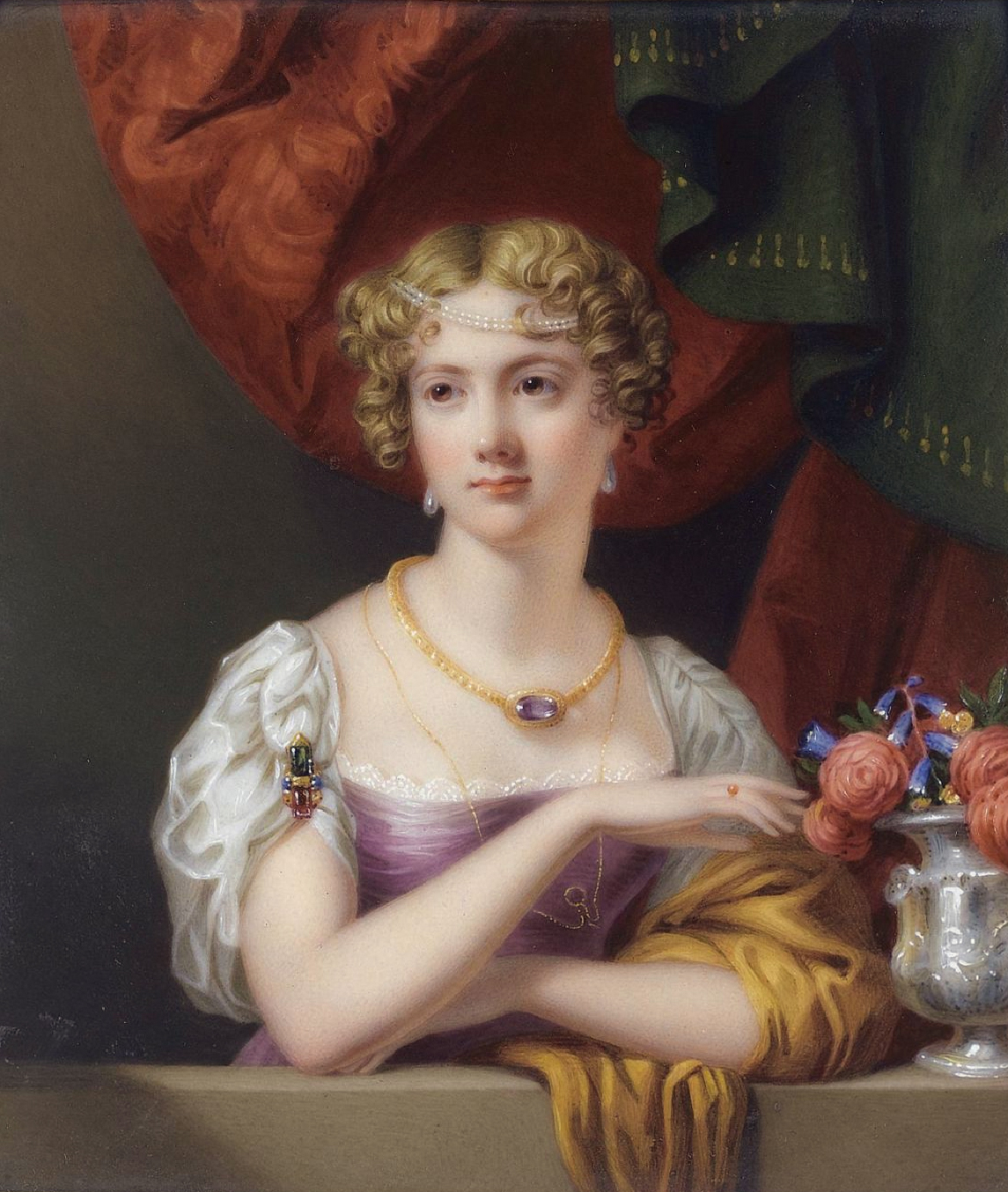
Georgiana Charlotte (Henry Pierce Bone)

- Lady Georgiana Charlotte Spencer (1794–1823), married Lord George Quin, son of Thomas Taylour, 1st Marquess of Headfort, and had issue.
- Vice-Admiral Frederick Spencer, 4th Earl Spencer (1798–1857)
- Very Reverend Hon. George Spencer (later known as The Venerable Father Ignatius Spencer) (1799–1864), a Roman Catholic convert who was declared Venerable on 20 February 2021

Lady Spencer died in June 1831, aged 68. Lord Spencer survived her by three years and died in November 1834, aged 76, at Althorp, and was buried in the nearby village of Great Brington on 19 November of that year.

== Spencer jacket ==
The Spencer, a type of short jacket from which the UK military mess jacket is derived, is named after George Spencer, reportedly because he had a tail-coat adapted after its tails were burned by coals from a fire.

== Coat of arms ==
Coat of arms of George Spencer, 2nd Earl Spencer
Coronet A Coronet of an Earl Crest Out of a Ducal Coronet Or a Griffin's Head Azure gorged with a Bar Gemelle Gules between two Wings expanded of the second Escutcheon Quarterly of eight, 1st and 8th quarterly Argent and Gules a fret Or overall on a bend Sable three escallops Argent (Spencer); 2nd Ermine on a chevron Gules five bezants a crescent for difference in centre chief Gules (Graunt); 3rd Or on two bars Gules three water bougets Argent (Willoughby); 4th Azure a fleur-de-ls Argent a mullet for difference in dexter chief also Argent (Digby); 5th Sable a lion rampant Argent on a canton Argent a cross Gules (Churchill); 6th Argent on a fess Gules three bezants (Jennings); 7th quarterly 1 and 4 Gules three clarions Or (Granville), 2 and 3 Gules four fuciles in fess Argent (Carteret). Supporters Dexter: A Griffin per fess Ermine and Erminois gorged with a Collar Sable the edges flory-counterflory and chained of the last and on the Collar three Escallops Argent; Sinister: A Wyvern Erect on his tail Ermine similarly collared and chained Motto Dieu Defend Le Droit (God defend the right)

== Ancestry ==
Ancestors of George Spencer, 2nd Earl Spencer

8. Charles Spencer, 3rd Earl of Sunderland
4. The Hon. John Spencer
9. Lady Anne Churchill
2. John Spencer, 1st Earl Spencer
10. John Carteret, 2nd Earl Granville
5. Lady Georgina Carolina Carteret
11. Frances Worsley
1. George Spencer, 2nd Earl Spencer
12. William Poyntz
6. Stephen Poyntz
13. Jane Monteage
3. Margaret Georgiana Poyntz
14. Hon. Lewis Mordaunt
7. Anna Maria Mordaunt
15. Mary Collyer

== See also ==
- Spencer Gulf, Australia

Parliament of Great Britain
Preceded by Wilbraham Tollemache; Sir George Robinson	Member of Parliament for Northampton; 1780–1783; With: George Rodney	Succeeded by George Rodney; The Lord Lucan
Preceded by Sir Joseph Mawbey; Augustus Keppel	Member of Parliament for Surrey; 1783; With: Sir Joseph Mawbey	Succeeded by Sir Joseph Mawbey; Sir Robert Clayton
Political offices
Preceded by The Marquess of Stafford	Lord Privy Seal; 1794	Succeeded by The Earl of Chatham
Preceded by The Earl of Chatham	First Lord of the Admiralty; 1794–1801	Succeeded by The Earl of St Vincent
Preceded by The Lord Hawkesbury	Home Secretary; 1806–1807	Succeeded by The Lord Hawkesbury
Peerage of Great Britain
Preceded by John Spencer	Earl Spencer; 1783–1834	Succeeded by John Charles Spencer
