= Sarah Lyttelton, Baroness Lyttelton =

British courtier (1787–1870)

The Right Honourable Baroness Lyttelton
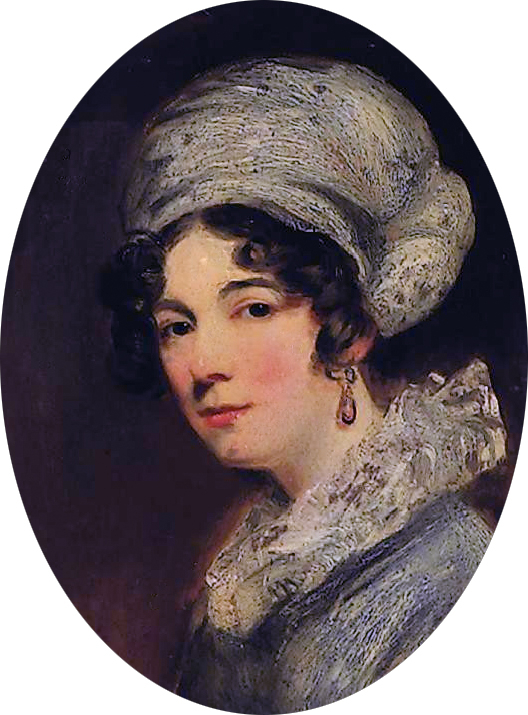
- Detail from a 19th-century portrait of Sarah, Lady Lyttelton by John Jackson
- Born: Sarah Spencer; 29 July 1787; Althorp, Northamptonshire
- Died: 13 April 1870 (aged 82); Hagley, Worcestershire
- Spouse: William Lyttelton, 3rd Baron Lyttelton
- Issue: Caroline; George Lyttelton, 4th Baron Lyttelton; Spencer; William; Lavinia
- Parents: George Spencer, 2nd Earl Spencer; Lady Lavinia Bingham

Sarah Lyttelton, Baroness Lyttelton (née Spencer; 29 July 1787 – 13 April 1870) was a British courtier, governess to Edward VII of the United Kingdom, and wife of William Lyttelton, 3rd Baron Lyttelton.

== Early life and family ==
Lady Sarah Spencer was born at the Spencer seat of Althorp in Northamptonshire on 29 July 1787, and was the eldest daughter of the Whig politician Sir George Spencer, 2nd Earl Spencer (1758–1834) and his wife Lady Lavinia Bingham (1762–1831).

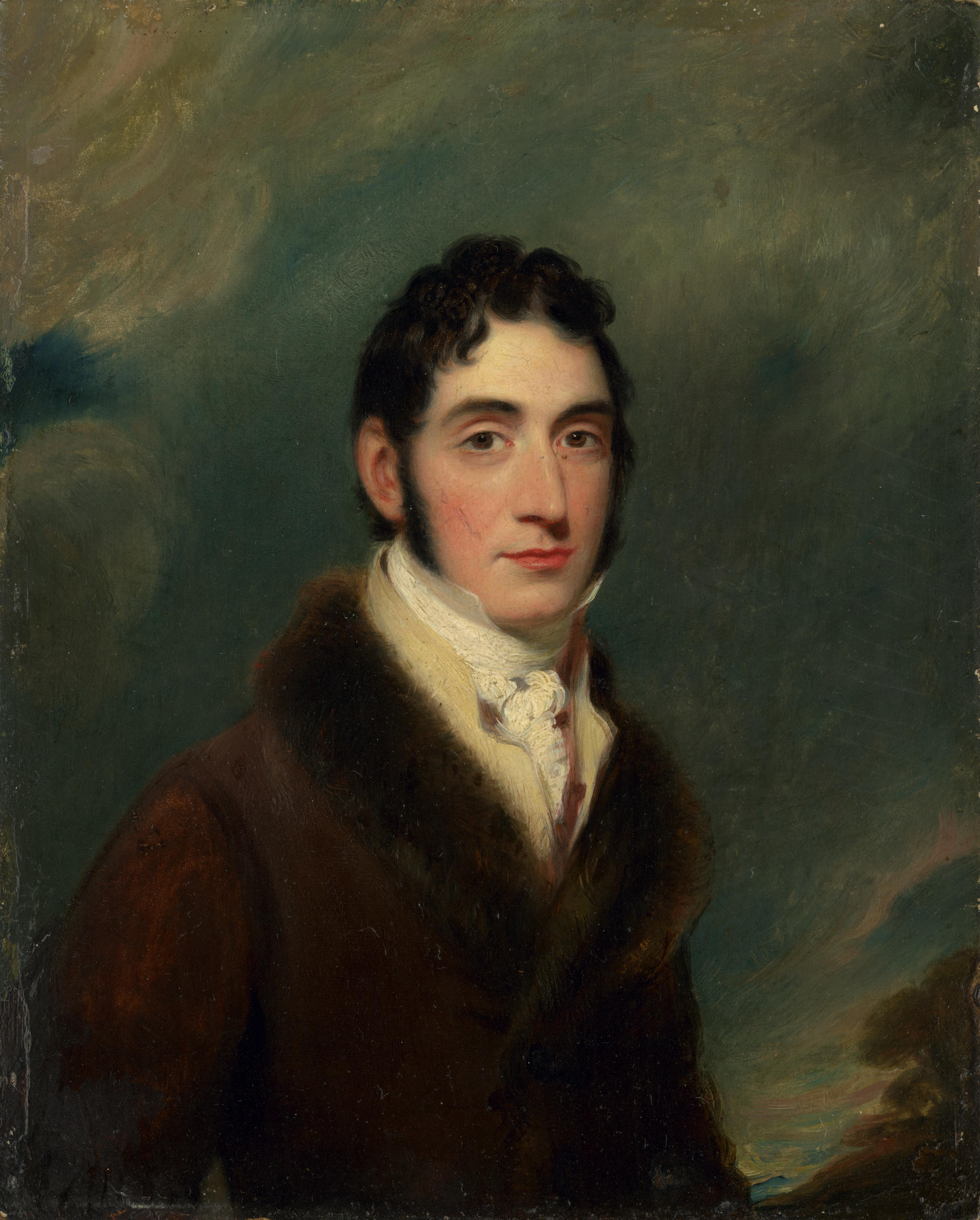
A c. 1849 portrait of Baroness Lyttelton's husband William Lyttelton, 3rd Baron Lyttelton

Sarah Spencer married Sir William Henry Lyttelton in March 1813, after an engagement of two months. He succeeded his half-brother to the barony of Lyttelton in 1828, upon which they began residing at Hagley Hall in Worcestershire. They had five children, two daughters Caroline (1816–1902) and Lavinia (1821–1850), and three sons George (1817–1876), Spencer (1818–1889) and William (1820–1884).

On 25 July 1839 her eldest son George (by then 4th Baron) married Mary, the daughter of Sir Stephen Richard Glynne, 8th Baronet. The marriage took place at Hawarden, the seat of William Ewart Gladstone who was simultaneously marrying Mary's sister Catherine. George became a distinguished classical scholar like his father, but committed suicide in 1876 by throwing himself down the stairs. Sarah's daughter, Lavinia, was later to marry Reverend Henry Glynne, brother of Catherine and Mary Glynne.

== Lady-in-waiting ==
Sarah Lyttelton was widowed in 1837, and shortly afterwards was offered the post of Lady of the Bedchamber to Queen Victoria. She is said to have commented to a friend at this time that "the character of an advisor, a woman of influence, a probable preserver or improver of the national morals is exactly the very last I could fill decently". Over time, Lyttelton earned the respect of the Queen and the Prince Consort and, in April 1843, she was appointed governess to the royal children, who continued to call her "Laddle", even once they were grown.

== Later life and death ==
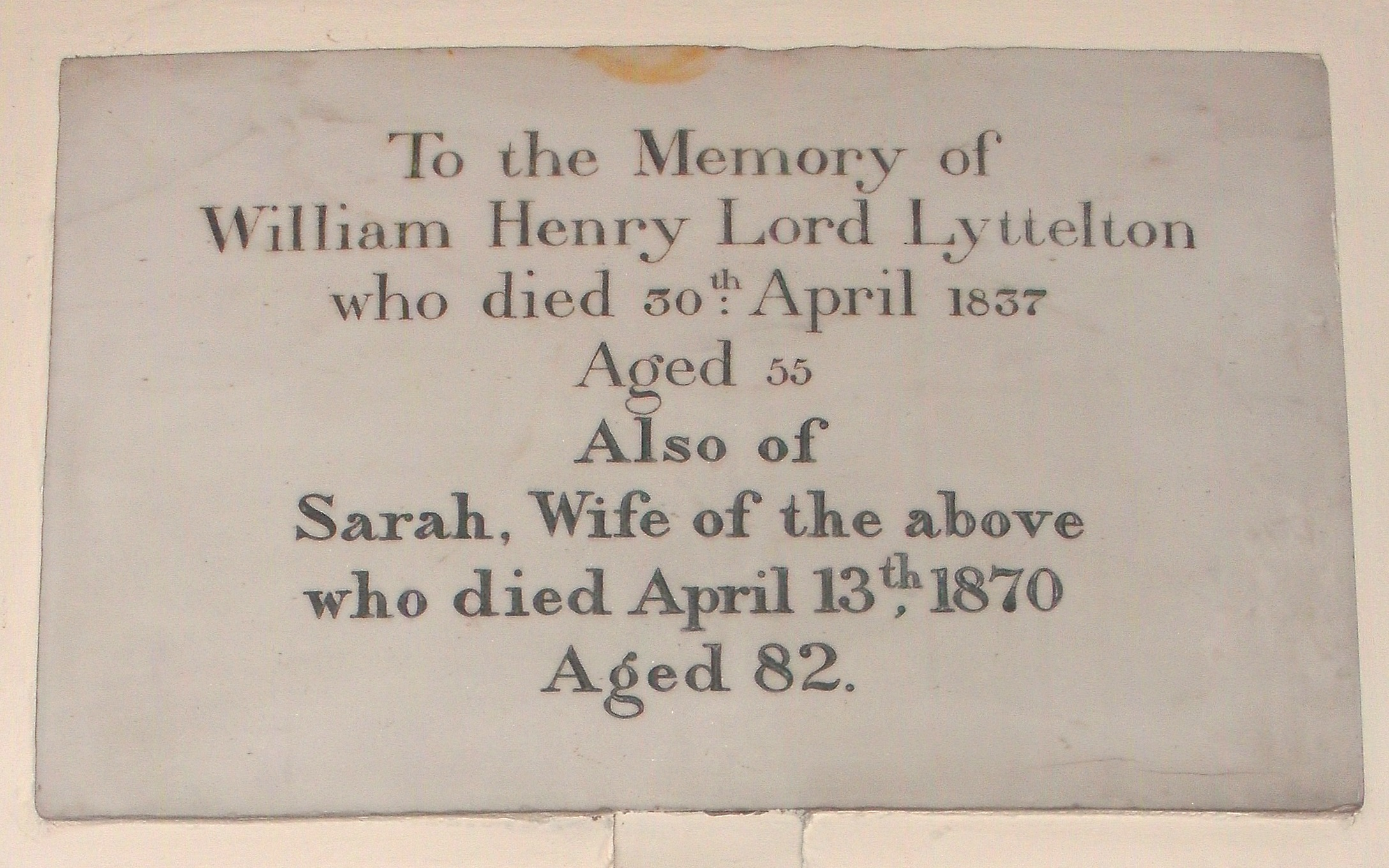
St John the Baptist Church, Hagley, memorial to William Henry Lyttelton, 3rd Baron Lyttelton, and his wife Sarah, née Spencer

In 1850, Lavinia died following the birth of her fourth child, and Lady Lyttelton requested the Queen's permission to resign so that she and her remaining daughter, Caroline, could return to Hagley to care for the motherless children. This was very reluctantly granted, Victoria accepting that her reasons were unanswerable. She was granted an extremely generous annual pension of 800 pounds.

Sarah Lyttelton died at Hagley on 13 April 1870 at the age of 82.

In 1912, John Murray published Correspondence of Sarah Spencer, Lady Lyttelton, 1787–1870, edited by Maud Mary Lyttelton Wyndham, who became in 1952 Baroness Leconfield.

== In popular culture ==
In the television series Victoria season 3 (2018) from ITV, Baroness Lyttleton is played by Siobhan O'Carroll.
