= William Lyttelton, 3rd Baron Lyttelton =

British politician (1782-1837)

The Right Honourable The Lord Lyttelton
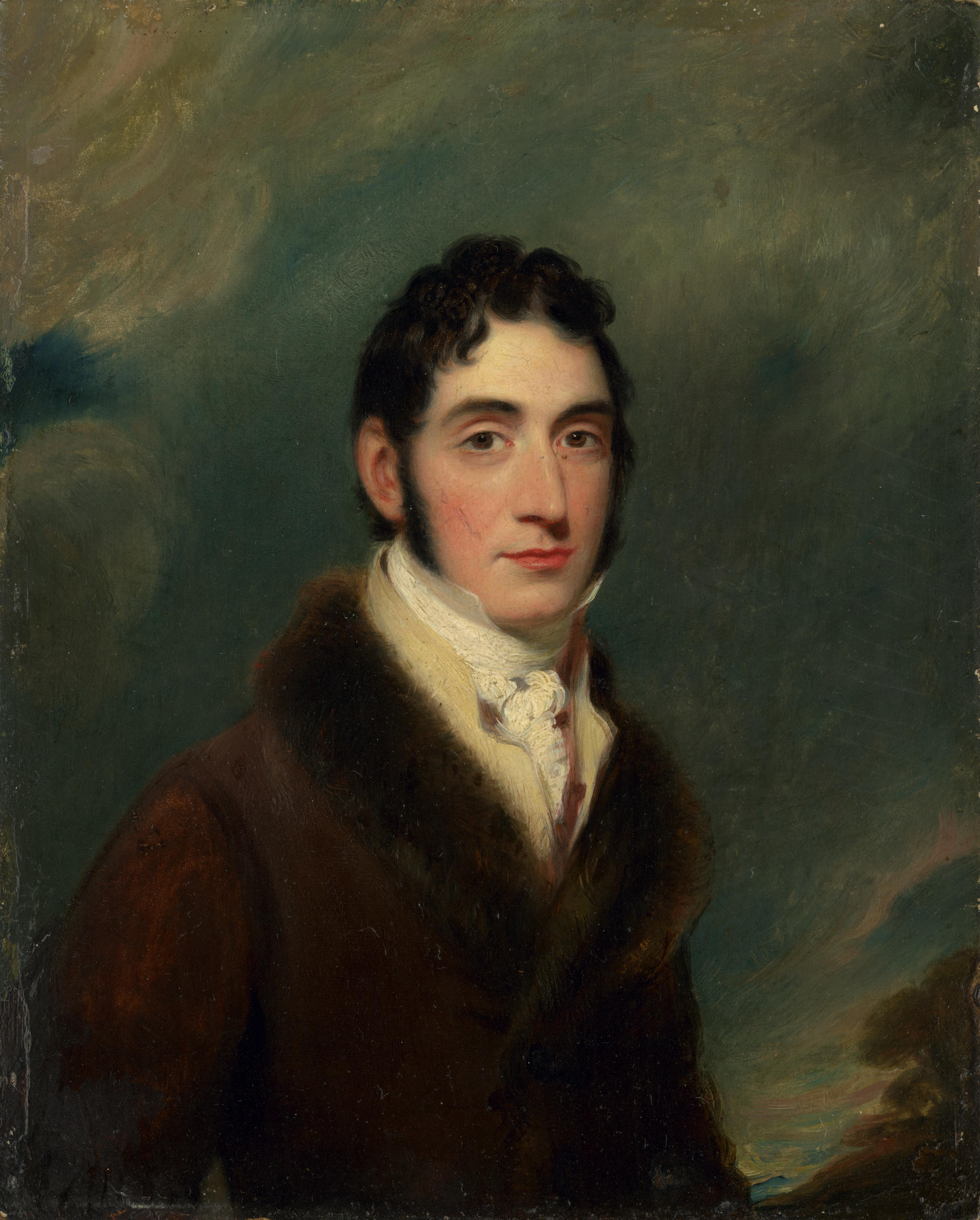
- A c. 1849 oil on millboard portrait of Lord Lyttelton by an unknown artist in the collection of the National Library of Australia

Member of Parliament for Worcestershire
- In office 1806–1820 Serving with Hon. William Beauchamp Lygon

Personal details
- Born: 3 April 1782
- Died: 30 April 1837 (aged 55) Green Park, London, England, UK
- Party: Whig
- Spouse: Lady Sarah Spencer (m. 1813)
- Children: Caroline; George; Spencer; William; Lavinia
- Parents: William Lyttelton, 1st Baron Lyttelton (father); Caroline Bristow (mother)
- Relatives: John Bristow (maternal grandfather); George Lyttelton, 2nd Baron Lyttelton (half-brother); George John, 2nd Earl Spencer (father-in-law); John Spencer, 3rd Earl Spencer (brother-in-law)
- Education: Rugby School
- Alma mater: Christ Church, Oxford
- Profession: Politician
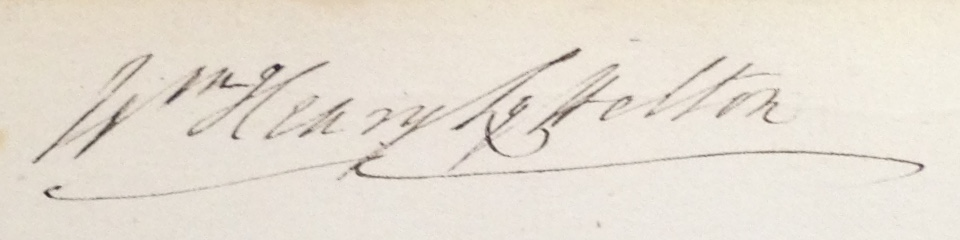
- Signature
- Lyttelton's signature from a copy of Blackstone's The Great Charter and Charter of the Forest (1759)

William Henry Lyttelton, 3rd Baron Lyttelton (3 April 1782 – 30 April 1837) was an English Whig politician from the Lyttelton family.

== Early life and education ==
Born on 3 April 1782, William Lyttelton was the son of William Henry Lyttelton, 1st Baron Lyttelton, by his second marriage to Caroline, daughter of John Bristow of Quidenham, Norfolk. He was educated at Rugby School, then matriculated at Christ Church, Oxford, on 24 October 1798 and graduated with a Bachelor of Arts (B.A.) on 17 June 1802 and a Master of Arts (M.A.) on 13 December 1805. A student from December 1800 until 1812 and a brilliant scholar of Greek, on 5 July 1810 he was created a Doctor of Civil Law (D.C.L.) on the occasion of Lord Grenville's installation as Chancellor of the University of Oxford.

== In the House of Commons ==
Lyttelton unsuccessfully contested Worcestershire in March 1806, but was returned in the following year, and represented the county until 1820 for the Whig party. His maiden speech was made on 27 February 1807 in favour of the rejection of the Westminster petition; and on 16 March he brought forward a motion (rejected by 46 votes) expressing regret at the substitution of the Duke of Portland's administration for Lord Grenville's. He attacked the new ministers, especially Spencer Perceval, for bigotry. He supported the naval expedition to Copenhagen in opposition to the bulk of his party, but voted with them on the motion of Samuel Whitbread for the production of papers relative to it.

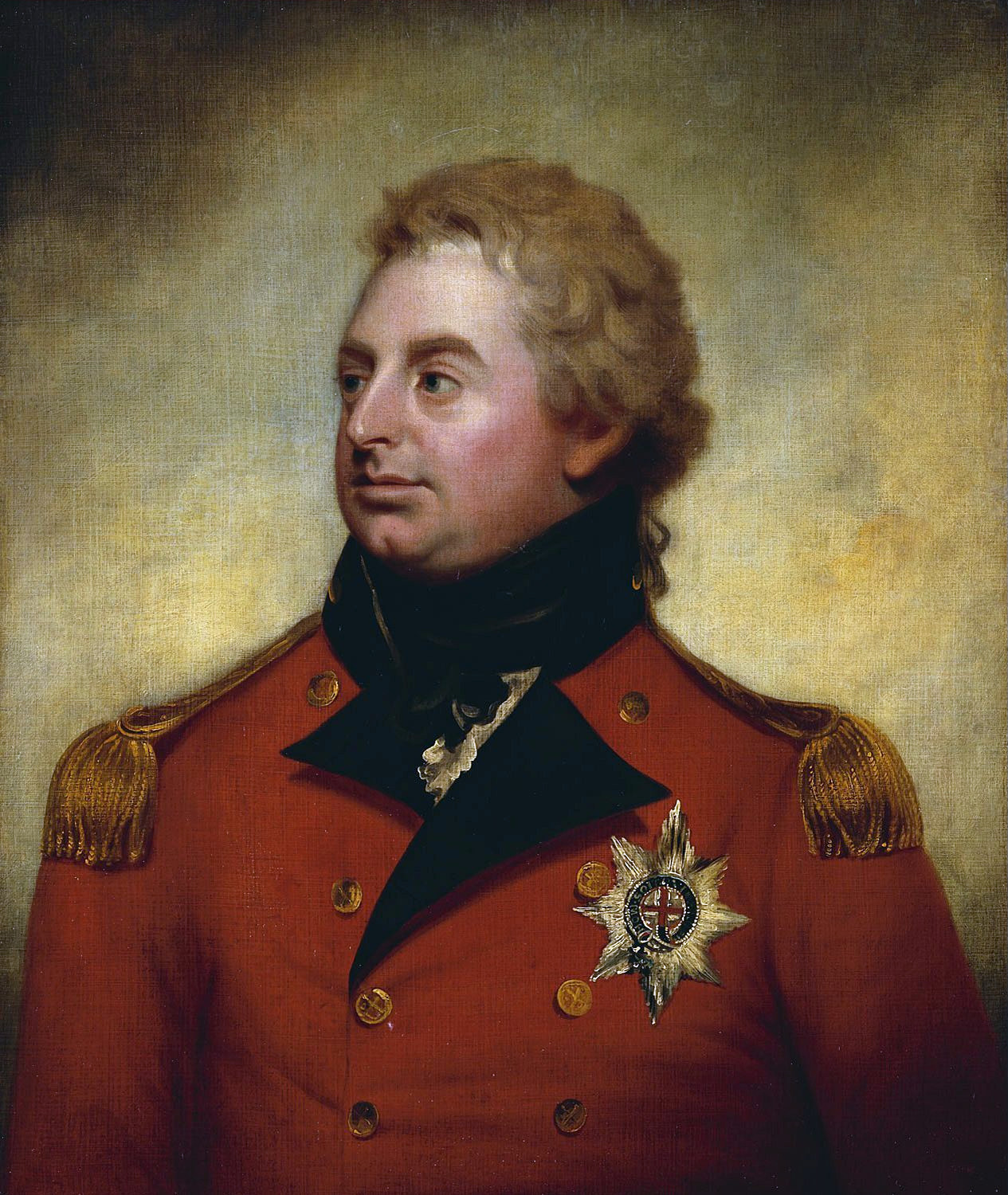
Prince Frederick, Duke of York and Albany (1763–1827). Lyttelton alleged that the Duke, who was the second child of George III, had corrupted members of parliament.

Lyttelton felt the Whig jealousy of the influence of the court. In supporting John Christian Curwen's bill for the prevention of the sale of seats, he suggested that the Duke of York and Albany, the late Commander-in-Chief of the Forces, had to some extent corrupted members of parliament; and in speaking on the budget resolutions of 1808 he declared his belief that the influence of the prerogative had increased. Again, on 4 May 1812, in a debate on the Royal Sinecure Offices Bill, he said that the Prince Regent was surrounded by favourites. Nevertheless, Lyttelton in 1819 thought that the "revolutionary faction of the radicals" ought to be opposed. In the same session he thought an inquiry was needed into the Peterloo massacre.

Lyttelton advocated abolishing the system of having climbing boys sweep chimneys, and was a strong opponent of the property tax. He supported Richard Brinsley Sheridan's motion of 6 February 1810 against the standing order for the exclusion of strangers from the house. In the same session, on 16 February, he opposed the voting of an annuity to the Duke of Wellington. He spoke strongly against the Alien Bill in 1816 and 1818.

== In the House of Lords ==
On the death of his half-brother George Lyttelton, 2nd Baron Lyttelton, on 12 November 1828, Lyttelton succeeded to the title. He did not take much part in the debates of the House of Lords, but on 6 December 1831, he made a speech in favour of the Reform Bill in the debate on the address. He was appointed Lord-Lieutenant of Worcestershire on 29 May 1833.

== Death ==
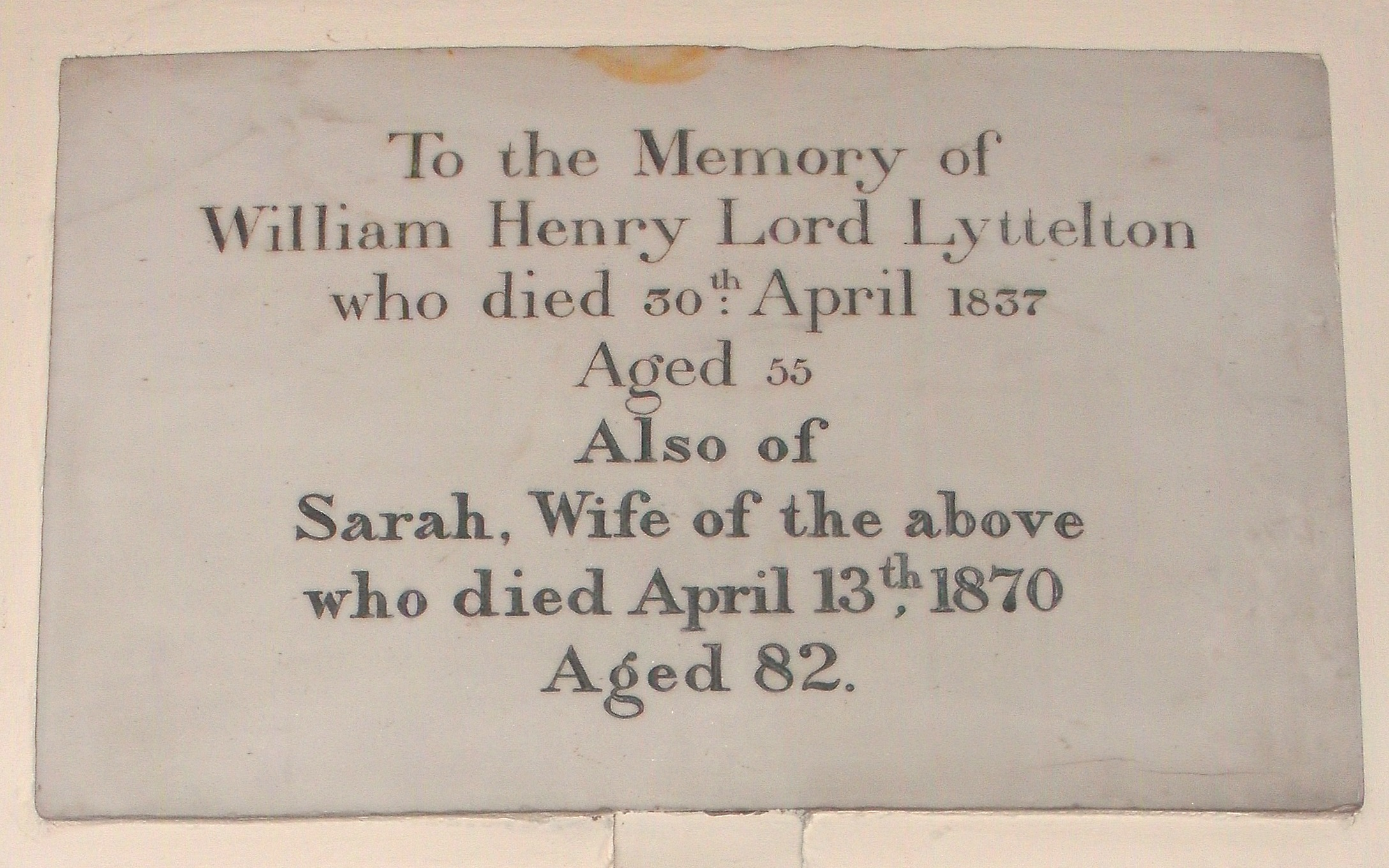
St John the Baptist Church, Hagley, memorial to William Henry Lyttelton, 3rd Baron Lyttelton, and his wife Sarah, née Spencer

Lyttelton died at the house of John Spencer, 3rd Earl Spencer, his brother-in-law, in Green Park, London, on 30 April 1837, aged 55.

== Works ==
Sydney Smith's Letters of Peter Plymley were for a time ascribed to Lyttelton before their authorship was known. In August 1815, through his friendship with the captain, he obtained a passage on board HMS Northumberland from Portsmouth to Plymouth to witness Napoleon's departure into exile, and privately printed 52 copies of An Account of Napoleon Buonaparte's Coming on Board H.M.S. Northumberland, 7 Aug. 1815; with Notes of Two Conversations Held with Him. He also printed a Catalogue of Pictures at Hagley (date of publication unknown), and published Private Devotions for School Boys.

== Family ==
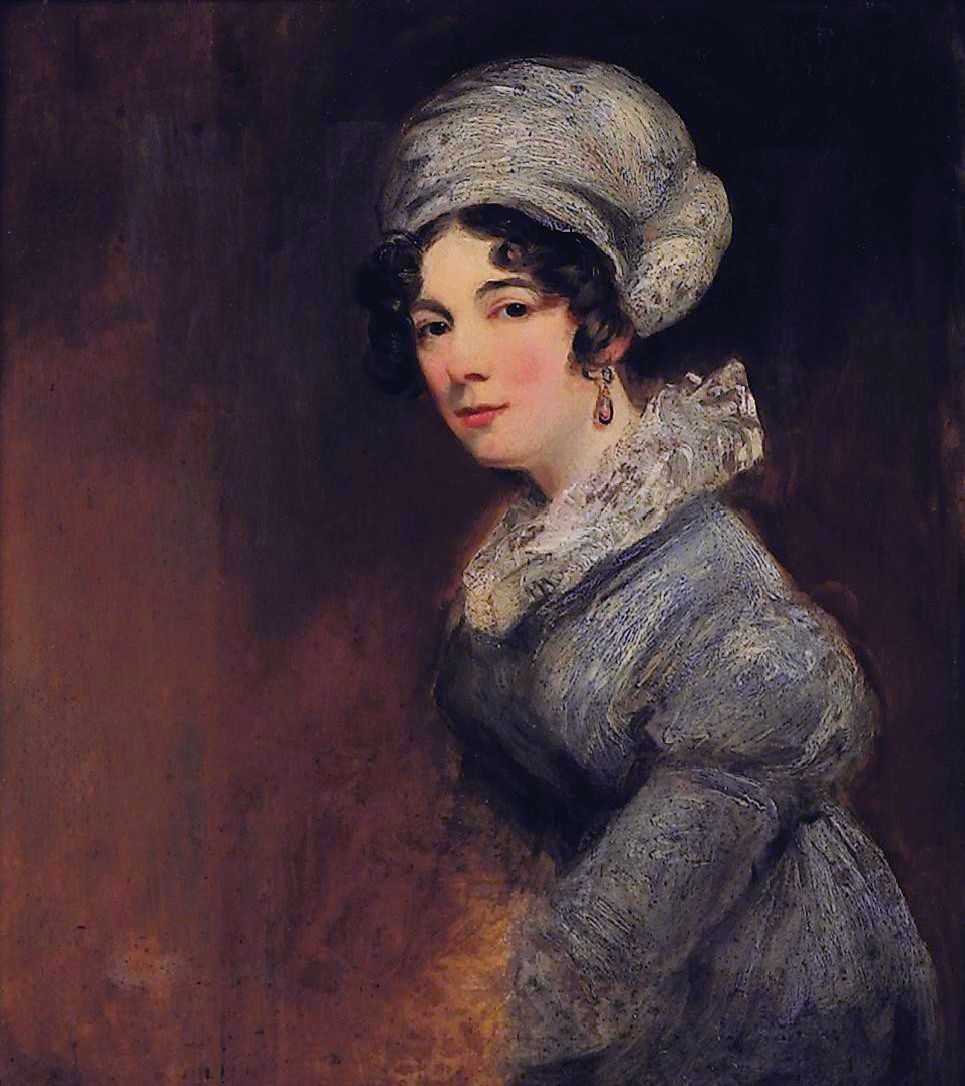
A 19th-century portrait of Lady Sarah Spencer, Lyttelton's wife, by John Jackson

Lyttelton married Lady Sarah Spencer, daughter of George John, 2nd Earl Spencer, on 4 March 1813; she was for a time governess to the children of Queen Victoria and a Lady of the Bedchamber, and died 13 April 1870. They had three sons and two daughters:

- The Honorable Caroline Lavinia Lyttelton (1 February 1816 – 8 April 1902)
- George William Lyttelton, 4th Baron Lyttelton (31 March 1817 – 19 April 1876), he married Mary Glynne on 25 July 1839. They had twelve children. He remarried Sybella Harriet Clive on 10 June 1869. They had three daughters.
- The Honorable Spencer Lyttelton (19 June 1818 – 4 February 1889), he married Henrietta Cornewall on 10 August 1848. They had one son.
- Reverend The Honorable William Lyttelton (3 April 1820 – 24 July 1884) he married Emily Pepys on 28 September 1854. He remarried Constance Yorke on 5 February 1880.
- The Honorable Lavinia Lyttelton (1821 - 3 October 1850), she married Reverend Henry Glynne rector of Hawarden. on 14 October 1843. They had four children.
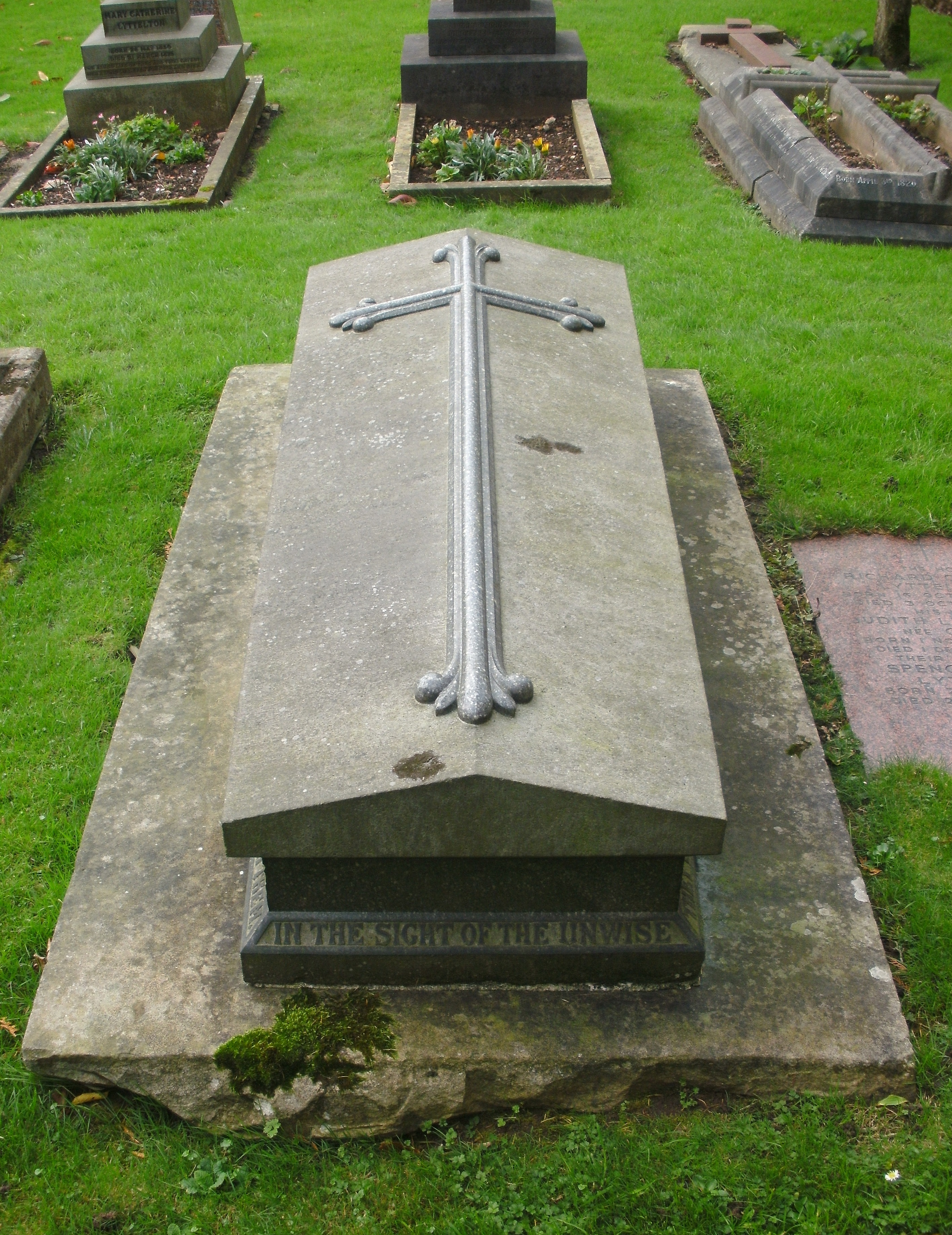
St John the Baptist Church, Hagley, grave of George William, 4th Baron Lyttelton

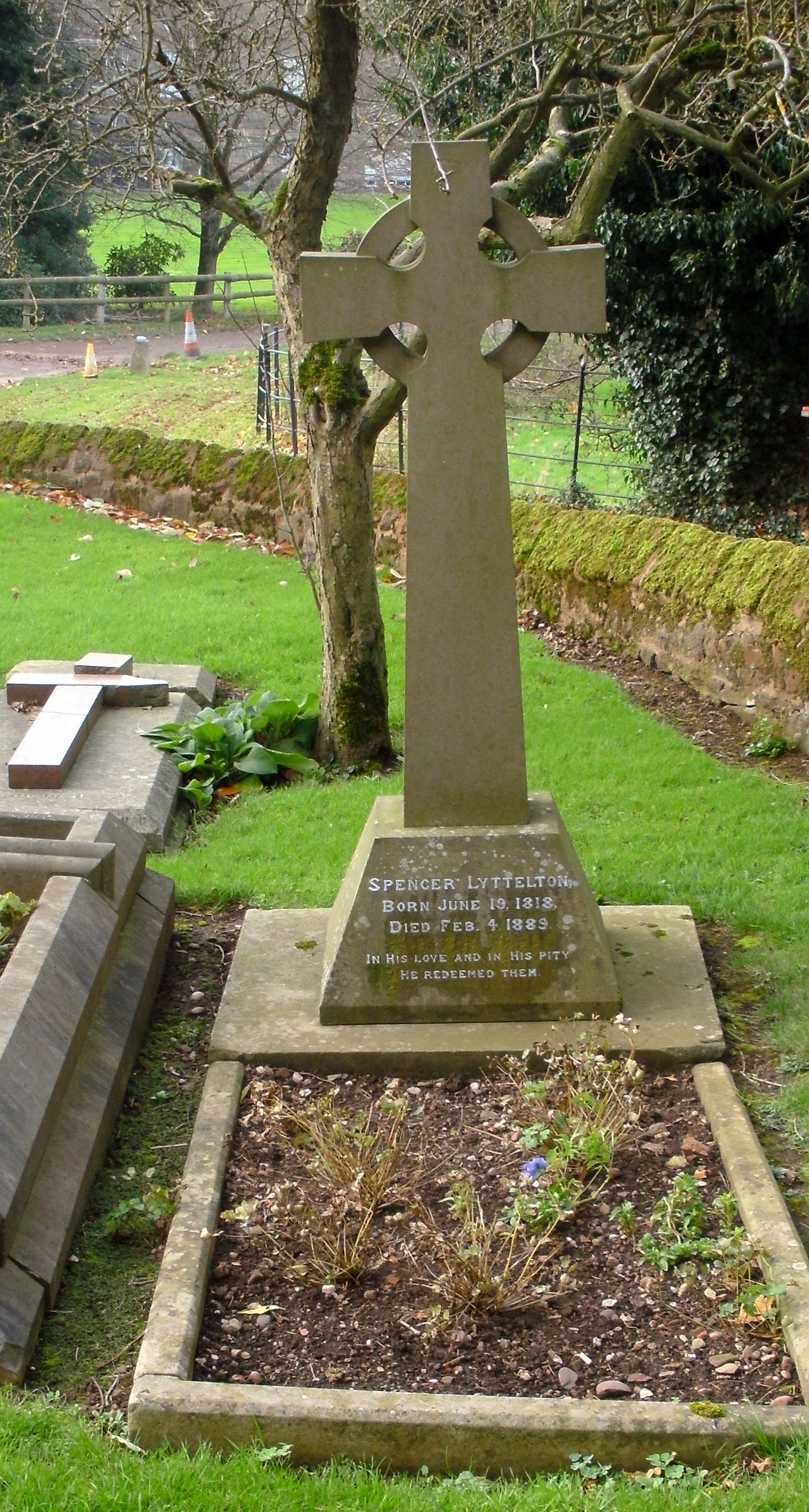
St John the Baptist Church, Hagley, grave of Spencer Lyttelton (1818–1882)

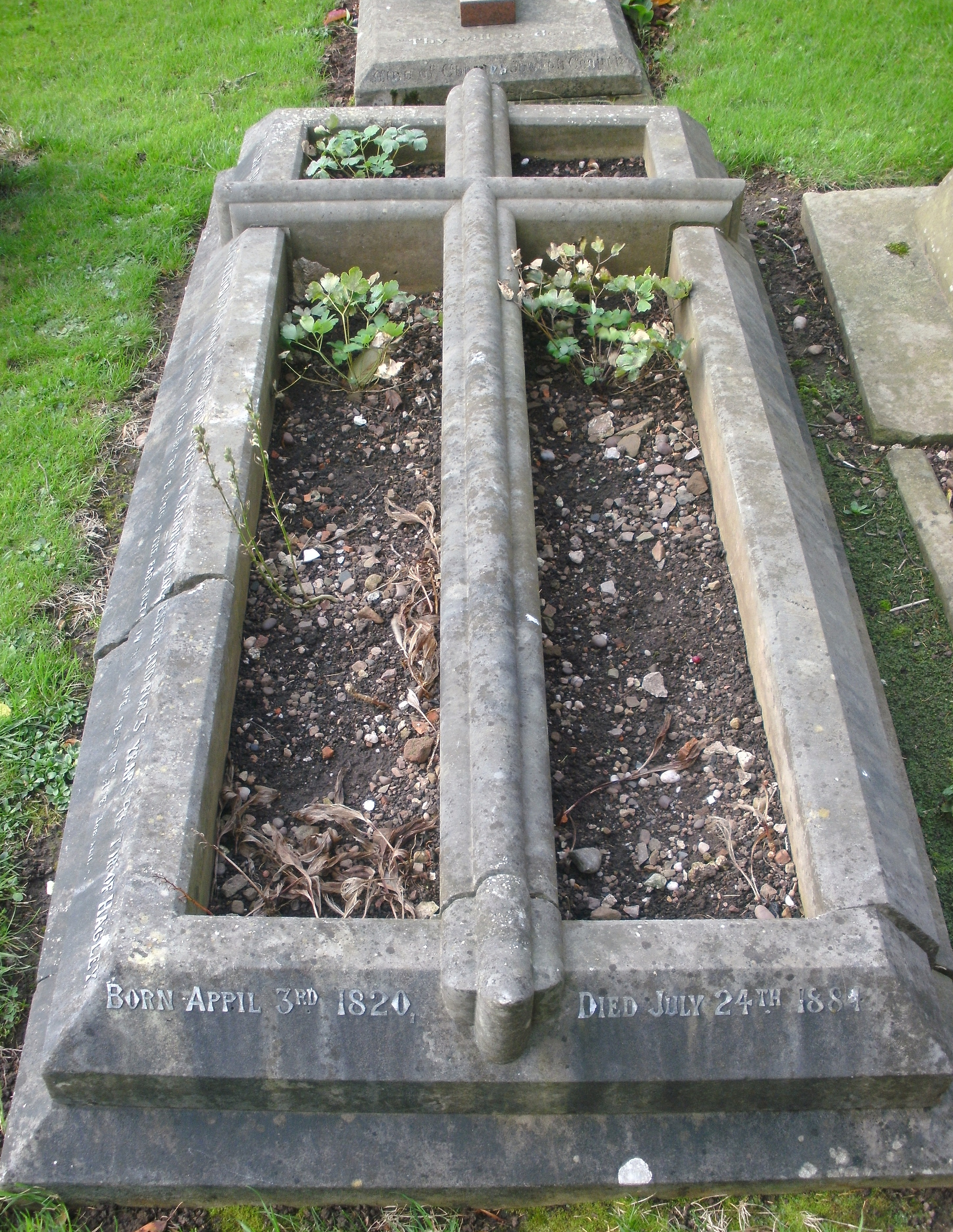
St John the Baptist Church, Hagley, grave of William Henry Lyttelton (1820–1884)

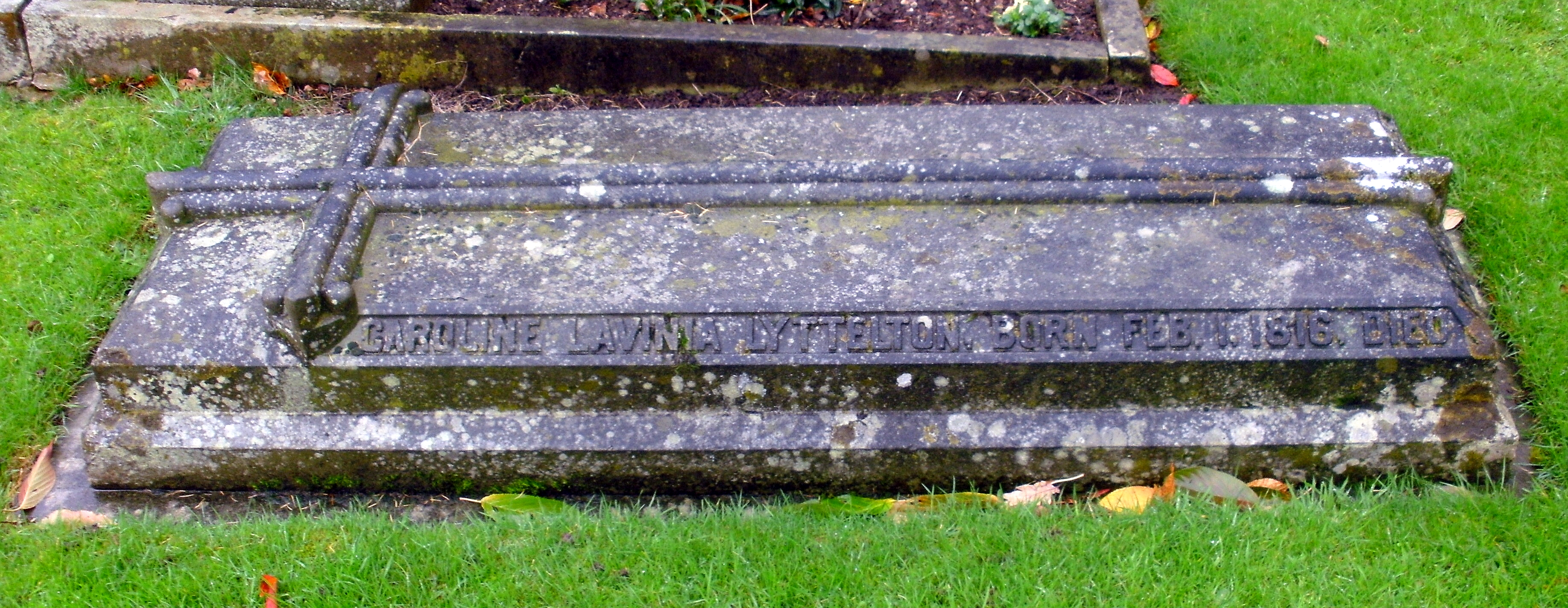
St John the Baptist Church, Hagley, grave of Caroline Lyttleton (1816–1902)

== Notes ==
Parliament of Great Britain
Preceded by Hon. William Beauchamp Lygon; Hon. John William Ward	Member of Parliament for Worcestershire; 1806–1820; With: Hon. William Beauchamp Lygon	Succeeded by Hon. William Beauchamp Lygon; Hon. Henry Beauchamp Lygon
Honorary titles
Preceded by The 3rd Lord Foley	Lord Lieutenant of Worcestershire; 1833–1837	Succeeded by The 4th Lord Foley
Peerage of Great Britain
Preceded by George Fulke Lyttelton	Baron Lyttelton; 1828–1837	Succeeded by George William Lyttelton
Peerage of Ireland
Preceded by George Fulke Lyttelton	Baron Westcote; 1828–1837	Succeeded by George William Lyttelton
