= Cuffe =

Cuffe is a surname. Notable people with the surname include:

- Charles Cuffe (1914–1972), Irish cricketer
- Ciarán Cuffe (born 1963), Irish Green Party politician
- Ellen Cuffe, Countess of Desart (1857–1933), Irish politician and company director
- Francis Cuffe (died 1694), Irish politician, MP for Mayo 1692–93
- Francis Cuffe (died 1717), Irish politician, MP for Mayo 1715–17
- Gerald Cuffe (1669 – after 1715), Irish politician, MP for Castlebar 1703–14
- Hamilton Cuffe, 5th Earl of Desart, KP, KCB, PC (1848–1934), British peer and solicitor
- Henry Cuffe (1563–1601), English author and politician, executed during the reign of Queen Elizabeth I of England for treason
- James Cuffe, 1st Baron Tyrawley (1747–1821), Irish peer and politician
- James Cuffe (died 1678) (died 1678), Irish politician
- James Cuffe (died 1762) (1707–1762), of Elmhall and Ballinrobe, was an Irish landowner in County Mayo
- James Cuffe (died 1828) (1778–1828), Irish MP, elected to the Irish House of Commons for Tulsk in 1800
- John Cuffe (1880–1931), Australian-born English cricketer and footballer
- John Cuffe, 3rd Earl of Desart (1818–1865), Irish Conservative politician
- Lady Charlotte Wheeler Cuffe (née Williams) (1867–1967), Irish botanic artist and collector
- Michael Cuffe (1694–1744), Irish Member of Parliament
- Mike Cuffe, Republican member of the Montana Legislature
- Nikita Cuffe, Australian water polo player
- Selena Cuffe, née Saunders (born 1975), African-American businesswoman
- William Cuffe, 4th Earl of Desart (1845–1898), Writer and Irish peer

== See also ==
- Cuffe Parade, upmarket neighbourhood in South Mumbai
- Paul Cuffe Farm, National Historic Landmark on 1504 Drift Road in Westport, Massachusetts
- Wheeler-Cuffe baronets, a title in the Baronetage of Ireland
- Cuff (disambiguation)
  - Cuff, extra layer of fabric at the lower edge of the sleeve of a garment
  - Cuff (surname), with list of people with surname 'Cuff'
- Kuffs, 1992 comedy film directed by Bruce A. Evans and produced by Raynold Gideon
