= John Bingham (disambiguation) =

John Bingham (1815–1900) was an American politician and judge

John Bingham may also refer to:

== Sportspeople ==
- John Bingham (cricketer) (1864–1946), Australian cricketer
- John Bingham (English footballer) (born 1949), English footballer
- John Bingham (Gaelic footballer), Louth defender
- John Bingham (runner) (born 1948), American long-distance runner and author

== Other ==
- John Bingham (MP for Nottingham), MP for Nottingham in March 1416 and 1420
- John Bingham (MP for Tuam) (1714–1780), Irish MP for Tuam, 1739–1760
- John Bingham, 1st Baron Clanmorris (1762–1821), Irish MP for Tuam, 1798–1800
- John Bingham, 4th Baron Clanmorris (1826–1876), Anglo-Irish landowner and aristocrat
- John Bingham, 5th Baron Clanmorris (1852–1916), Irish peer
- John Bingham, 7th Baron Clanmorris (1908–1988), Irish peer, secret agent, and novelist
- John Bingham, 7th Earl of Lucan (1934–after 1974), British peer and suspected murderer, popularly known as Lord Lucan
- John Bingham (loyalist) (1953–1986), Ulster Volunteer Force member
- John Bingham (Roundhead) (1615–1673), English politician who sat in the House of Commons between 1645 and 1659
- John Bingham (pianist) (1942–2003), British classical pianist
- Sir John Bingham, 1st Baronet of the Bingham baronets
- Sir John Bingham, 5th Baronet (1690–1749), Irish MP for Mayo 1727–1749
- Sir John Bingham, 6th Baronet (1728–1750), his son, Irish MP for Mayo 1749–1750

== See also ==
- J. B. Morton or John Bingham Morton (1893–1979), English writer and columnist
- Bingham (surname)
