= James Cuffe =

James Cuffe may refer to:

- Sir James Cuffe (died 1678), Irish MP for Mayo 1661, grandfather of
- James Cuffe (died 1762) (1707–1762), Irish MP for Mayo 1742–61, father of
- James Cuffe, 1st Baron Tyrawley (1747–1821), Irish MP for Mayo 1768–97, for Donegal Borough 1776–77, for Tuam 1783, and peer, father of
- James Cuffe (died 1828) (1778–1828), Irish MP for Tralee 1819–28

== See also ==
- James Cuffey (1911–1999), American astronomer
