= Henry Bingham =

Henry Bingham may refer to:

- Sir Henry Bingham, 1st Baronet (1573–c. 1658), Irish MP for Castlebar
- Sir Henry Bingham, 3rd Baronet (1654–1714), Irish MP for Mayo, Custos Rotulorum for Mayo
- Henry H. Bingham (1841–1912), US politician and brigadier general, Medal of Honor recipient
- Henry Bingham (1715–1769), Irish politician, MP for Tuam
- Henry Bingham (1688–1743), Irish politician, MP for County Mayo, and for Castlebar
