= Arthur Gore, 2nd Earl of Arran =

Irish peer (1734–1809)

The Right Honourable The Earl of Arran KP, PC
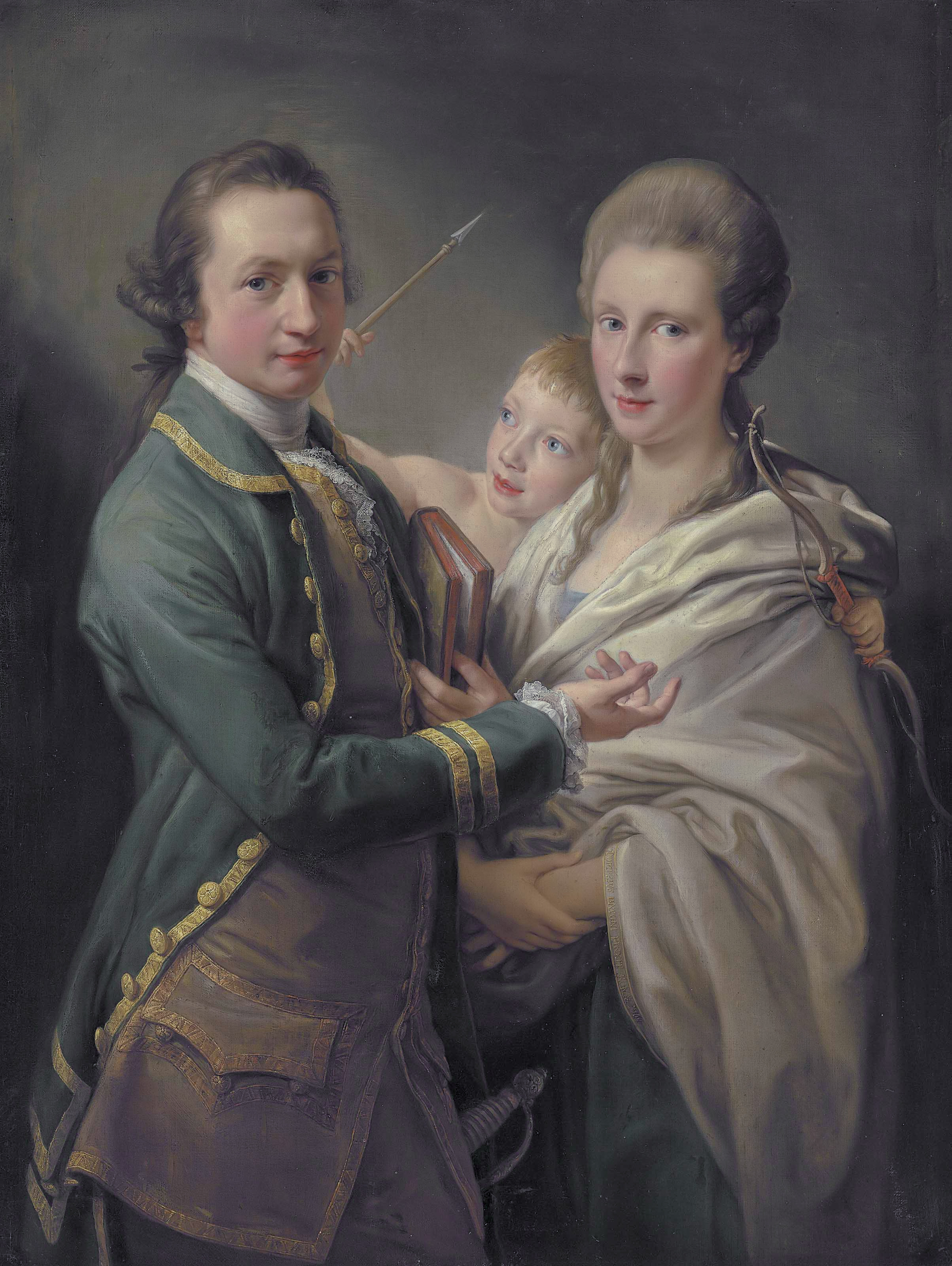
- Portrait by Pompeo Batoni, 1769

Member of Parliament for Donegal Borough
- In office 1768–1774 Serving with Richard Gore
- Preceded by: Robert Doyne; John Knox
- Succeeded by: Barry Yelverton; Richard Gore

Member of Parliament for County Wexford
- In office 1761–1768 Serving with Caesar Colclough, Vesey Colclough
- Preceded by: Caesar Colclough; Andrew Ram
- Succeeded by: Vesey Colclough; Hon. Henry Loftus

Member of Parliament for Donegal Borough
- In office 1759–1761 Serving with John Folliott
- Preceded by: Sir Arthur Gore, 3rd Bt; John Folliott
- Succeeded by: Robert Doyne; John Knox

Personal details
- Born: Arthur Saunders Gore; 25 July 1734
- Died: 8 October 1809 (aged 75)
- Spouses: Hon. Catherine Annesley (m. 1760; died 1770) Anne Knight (m. 1771; died 1779) Elizabeth Underwood (m. 1781)
- Children: 16, including Arthur, Cecilia, and Charles
- Parent(s): The 1st Earl of Arran; Jane Saunders
- Relatives: Sir Arthur Gore, 2nd Baronet (grandfather); Philip Gore, 4th Earl of Arran (grandson)

Arthur Saunders Gore, 2nd Earl of Arran, KP, PC (Ire) (25 July 1734 – 8 October 1809), styled The Honourable Arthur Gore from 1758 to 1762 and Viscount Sudley from 1762 to 1773, was an Irish peer and politician.

== Early life ==
Arran was the eldest son of Arthur Gore, 1st Earl of Arran, and Jane Saunders. His younger brothers were Hon. Richard Gore, MP and Hon. Paul Gore, who married Anne Leonard (a daughter of William Leonard). His sisters were Lady Joanna Gore (wife of Philip Doyne and, after his death, Michael Daly) and Lady Elizabeth Gore (wife of Sir John Evans-Freke, 1st Baronet).

His paternal grandparents were Sir Arthur Gore, 2nd Baronet, and the former Elizabeth Annesley (a daughter of Maurice Annesley of Sherlock v Annesley infamy). His aunt, Anne Gore, was married to the 1st Earl of Altamont. His maternal grandfather was Richard Saunders (a grandson of Henry Whitfield, MP).

Upon his grandfather's death, his father became the 3rd Gore Baronet of Newtown. After his father was raised to the Peerage of Ireland as Baron Saunders of Deeps in the County of Wexford, and Viscount Sudley of Castle Gore in the County of Mayo in 1758, he was styled The Honourable Arthur Gore. When his father was made the Earl of Arran in 1762, he assumed the courtesy title of Viscount Sudley for himself.

== Career ==
He was elected to the Irish House of Commons for Donegal Borough in 1759, a seat he held until 1761 and again from 1768 to 1774 and also represented County Wexford between 1761 and 1768. In 1773, he succeeded his father as second Earl of Arran and entered the Irish House of Lords. Arran was also appointed High Sheriff of County Wexford in 1757 and High Sheriff of Mayo in 1765.

He was admitted to the Irish Privy Council in 1771 and in 1783 he was invested as one of the original sixteen Knights of the Order of St Patrick.

== Personal life ==
On 14 July 1760, Lord Arran married Hon. Catherine Annesley (1739–1770), only daughter of the 1st Viscount Glerawly and Lady Anne Beresford (eldest daughter of the 1st Earl of Tyrone). They had six children:

- Arthur Saunders Gore, 3rd Earl of Arran (20 July 1761 – 20 January 1837), who married Mary Tyrrell, governess to Princess Charlotte of Wales and only surviving daughter and heiress of Sir John Tyrrell, 5th Baronet
- Lady Anne Jane Gore (April 1763 – 3 May 1827), who married Henry Hatton of Great Clonard in 1783, and after his death married, as his third wife, John Hamilton, 1st Marquess of Abercorn in 1800
- Lady Elizabeth Araminta Gore (April 1764 – ?), who married Henry Monck
- Lady Catherine Charlotte Gore (September 1766 – 1852), who married her cousin, John Evans-Freke, 6th Baron Carbery
- Colonel Hon. William John Gore (1767–1836), Master of the Horse to the Lord Lieutenant of Ireland, who married Caroline Hales, youngest daughter and co-heiress of Sir Thomas Hales, 4th Baronet
- Lady Jane Gore (November 1770 – 1831), who married Dudley Loftus of Killyon

In 1771, he remarried to Anne Knight, daughter of Rev. Boleyn Knight of Otley. Before her death in 1779, they were the parents of three children:

- Very Rev. Hon. George Gore (February 1774 – 1844), who married Anne Burrowes, daughter of Robert Burrowes of Stradone, then married Sophia Ribton, daughter of Sir George Ribton, 2nd Baronet, in 1820, and married for the third time Maria Isaac, widow of Thomas Bunbury Isaac of Hollywood House, in 1823
- Lady Maria Louisa Gore (June 1775 – 1827), who married James Knox-Gore of Broadlands Park in 1800
- Lady Eleanor Gore (September 1776 – 21 March 1812), who married Hon. Frederick Cavendish, fourth son of Rt Hon. Sir Henry Cavendish, 2nd Baronet and Sarah Bradshaw, 1st Baroness Waterpark, in 1801

In February 1781, he remarried for the third, and final, time to Elizabeth Underwood, daughter of Richard Underwood and Christiana Goold (daughter of Caleb Goold of Dublin). Together, they had seven children:

- Hon. Saunders Gore (1783–1813), who died unmarried
- Hon. John Gore (c. 1784–1814), who died unmarried
- Lady Cecilia Gore (c. 1785–1873), who married, as his second wife, Sir George Buggin of Great Cumberland Place, London in 1815, then married, in contravention of the Royal Marriages Act 1772, as his second wife, Prince Augustus Frederick, Duke of Sussex, the sixth son of King George III, in 1831; she later became Duchess of Inverness
- Lady Isabella Gore (c. 1786–1838), who in 1816 married the Rev. Hon. Charles Douglas, brother of the 17th Earl of Morton and second son of Hon. John Douglas (a younger son of the 14th Earl of Morton) and Lady Frances Lascelles (eldest daughter of the 1st Earl of Harewood)
- General Hon. Sir Charles Stephen Gore (1793–1869), Lieutenant-Governor of Chelsea Hospital, who married Sarah Rachel Fraser, daughter of James Fraser of Nova Scotia, in 1824
- Captain Hon. Edward Gore (1797–1879), who married Mary Anne Douglas in 1822
- Lady Julia Gore (1800–1891), who married Robert Manners Lockwood in 1821

Lord Arran died in October 1809, aged 75, and was succeeded in his titles by his eldest son Arthur. His widow, the Dowager Countess of Arran, died in 1829.

Parliament of Ireland
Preceded by Sir Arthur Gore, 3rd Bt; John Folliott	Member of Parliament for Donegal Borough; 1759–1761; With: John Folliott	Succeeded by Robert Doyne; John Knox
Preceded by Caesar Colclough; Andrew Ram	Member of Parliament for County Wexford; 1761–1768; With: Caesar Colclough 1761–1766; Vesey Colclough 1766–1768	Succeeded by Vesey Colclough; Hon. Henry Loftus
Preceded by Robert Doyne; John Knox	Member of Parliament for Donegal Borough; 1768–1774; With: Richard Gore	Succeeded by Barry Yelverton; Richard Gore
Peerage of Ireland
Preceded by Arthur Gore	Earl of Arran; 1773–1809	Succeeded by Arthur Saunders Gore
