= Francis Cuffe =

Francis Cuffe may refer to:

- Francis Cuffe (died 1694), Irish politician, MP for Mayo 1692–93
- Francis Cuffe (died 1717), Irish politician, MP for Mayo 1715–17

== See also ==
- Cuffe (disambiguation)
