= High Sheriff of Mayo =

British judicial representative in County Mayo, Ireland (1500's-1922)

The High Sheriff of Mayo was the British Crown's judicial representative in County Mayo, Ireland from the 16th century until 1922, when the office was abolished in the new Free State and replaced by the office of Mayo County Sheriff. The sheriff had judicial, electoral, ceremonial and administrative functions and executed High Court Writs. In 1908, an Order in Council made the Lord-Lieutenant the Sovereign's prime representative in a county and reduced the High Sheriff's precedence. However, the sheriff retained his responsibilities for the preservation of law and order in the county. The usual procedure for appointing the sheriff from 1660 onwards was that three persons were nominated at the beginning of each year from the county and the Lord Lieutenant then appointed his choice as High Sheriff for the remainder of the year. Often the other nominees were appointed as under-sheriffs. Sometimes a sheriff did not fulfil his entire term through death or other event and another sheriff was then appointed for the remainder of the year. The dates given hereunder are the dates of appointment. All addresses are in County Mayo unless stated otherwise.

== High Sheriffs of County Mayo ==
- 1583: John Brown (1st High Sheriff)
- 1587–1589: John Brown (killed Mar 1589)
- 1639: Sir Henry Bingham, 1st Baronet<
- 1641: John Garvey
- 1655: Edward Ormsby of Tobervaddy Castle
- 1656: Sir Arthur Gore, 1st Baronet
- 1662: Hon Sir Lucas Dillon
- 1662: Sir George Bingham, 2nd Baronet
- 1670: Sir Arthur Gore, 1st Baronet
- 1678: Sir George Bingham, 2nd Baronet
- 1684: Sir Henry Bingham, 3rd Baronet
- 1690: George Browne
- 1694: Sir Henry Bingham, 3rd Baronet
- 1703: Egbert Miller of Milford
- 1708: Sir Arthur Shaen, 2nd Baronet
- 1711: Sir Arthur Gore, 2nd Baronet
- 1718: Francis Knox of Moyne Abbey
- 1721: Sir John Bingham, 5th Baronet
- 1723: James Gildea of Gallagh and Port Royal
- 1731: John Browne, 1st Earl of Altamont
- 1732–1733: Arthur Knox of Castle Rea
- 1735: Robert Miller of Milford
- 1737: John Bourke, 1st Baron Naas
- 1745: Thomas Lewin of Cloghans
- 1746: William Chambers of Kilboyne [40]
- 1747: Sir George Browne, 6th Baronet
- 1748:
- 1750: Crosdaile Miller of Milford
- 1755: Roger Palmer, later Sir Roger Palmer, 1st Baronet of Castlelacken
- 1756: Charles Bingham, 1st Earl of Lucan
- 1756: Crosdaile Miller
- 1758: James Knox of Moyne Abbey
- 1762: Mathew Vaughan of Carramore
- 1763: John Knox of Castlerea (son of Arthur, HS 1733)
- 1765: Arthur Saunders Gore, 2nd Earl of Arran of the Arran Islands
- 1766:
- 1776: Neale O'Donnell, later Sir Neale O'Donnell, 1st Baronet of Newport
- 1778: John Browne, 1st Baron Kilmaine
- 1779: John Denis Browne, 1st Marquess of Sligo
- 1781: Valentine Blake
- 1782: Charles Costello of Edmondstown
- 1783: John Ormsby of Gortnarabby
- 1784: George Jackson, the younger, of Prospect
- 1785: Charles Atkinson of Rehins
- 1786: Hon. Denis Browne of Claremorris
- 1787: Charles Dillon-Lee, 12th Viscount Dillon of Costello-Gallin
- 1788: John Browne, 1st Baron Kilmaine
- 1791: Sir John Edmond Browne, 1st Baronet
- 1796: Joseph Lambert of Brockhill
- 1798: Right Hon Denis Browne

== 19th century ==
- 1800:
- 1802: Major Michael Cormick of Castlehill, Crossmolina
- 1804: Owen O'Maley
- 1805: Andrew Clarke O'Malley
- 1806: Robert Orme
- 1807: William Orme
- 1808: George Gildea
- 1809: Thomas Palmer
- 1810: Henry William Knox of Netley Park
- 1811: John Ormsby
- 1812: George Mahon
- 1813–1814: Connell O'Donnell
- 1815: Henry P. Browne
- 1816: Owen O'Malley
- 1817: Henry Peter Browne
- 1818: James Cuffe of Deal Castle
- 1819: Dominick Browne
- 1820: William Jackson of Enniscoe
- 1821: John Knox of Mount Falcon
- 1822: Thomas Spencer Lindsey of Hollymount House
- 1823: John Frederic Knox of Mount Falcon
- 1824: Colonel George Jackson, of Enniscoe
- 1825: Annesley Knox, of Rappa Castle, Ballina.
- 1826: Sir William Brabazon, 2nd Baronet
- 1827: George Ormsby, of Gortner Abbey, Crossmolina
- 1828: Patrick Kirwan, of Dalgin-park, Headfort.
- 1829: Annesley Knox of Rappa Castle, Ballina
- 1831: Charles Nesbitt Knox of Castle Lacken
- 1834: Sir Richard Annesley O'Donell, Baronet
- 1834: John Gardiner, of Farmhill, Killala
- 1836: Thomas Valentine Clendining of Thomastown, Ballyglass
- 1837: Sir William O'Malley
- 1838: Maurice Blake of Ballinafad
- 1839: Valentine O'Connor Blake
- 1840: Lieut-Col Sir Francis Knox-Gore, 1st Baronet of Belleek Manor, Ballina.
- 1841: Honorable Geoffry Dominick Browne
- 1842: George Vaughan-Jackson of Carramore House, Ballina.
- 1843: Mervyn Pratt
- 1845: Henry William Knox, of Netley Park.
- 1846: Patrick Crean Lynch, of Cloghr House, Ballyglass
- 1848: C.L. Kirwan of Dalgan Park, Headford
- 1849: Anthony Ormsby of Ballinamore, Ballyglass.
- 1850: Charles Mahon, of Mount Pleasant Ballyglass.
- 1851: David Watson Ruttledge of Barbersfort
- 1852: John Knox of Greenwood Park
- 1853:
- 1855: Mark Blake of Ballinafad
- 1856:
- 1858: Honourable George Yelverton of Hayerock, Westport
- 1860: Charles Knox of Ballinrobe
- 1862: Philip Taaffe of Woodville, Kilkelly.
- 1864: Robert Ruttledge.
- 1864: Maurice Charles Joseph Blake.
- 1865: Thomas Bruen.
- 1866:
- 1869: Oliver Vaughan Jackson of Carramore House, Ballina.
- 1870: Charles B. Miller of Milford, Foxhall, Tuam.
- 1871:
- 1873: Charles Howe Cuff Knox of Creagh.
- 1875: Utred Augustus Knox of Mount Falcon, Ballina.
- 1876: Joseph Pratt Esq. of Enniscoe House, Crossmolina & Cabra Castle, County Cavan.
- 1877: Lieut-Col Sir Charles James Knox-Gore JP, 2nd Baronet of Belleek Manor, Ballina.
- 1878: Lieut-Col Arthur William Knox-Gore Esq. of Ballina House.
- 1879: Thomas Tighe of Clairmorris.
- 1881: Dominick Andrew Browne of Breaghwy.
- 1882:
- 1884: Robert Vesey Stoney.
- 1884: Annesley Arthur Knox of Rappa Castle, Ballina.
- 1886: Frederic Thomas Lewin of Cloghans.
- 1886: Owen Bingham Manners O'Malley.
- 1888: Sir Roger William Henry Palmer, 5th Baronet.
- 1889: Sir George Clendining O'Donell, 5th Baronet.
- 1889: Heremon John Francis Headfort Lindsey-Fitzpatrick of Hollymount.
- 1890: Geoffrey Browne, 3rd Baron Oranmore and Browne of Castle MacGarrett, Claremorris.
- 1891: Arthur Knox Gildea of Clooncormack.
- 1892–93: Ormsby Bowen Miller.
- 1894: Edwin Thomas-O'Donel of Newport House, Newport.
- 1895: Major-General William Boyd Saunders-Knox-Gore of Ardmore, Torquay, Devon & Belleek Manor, Ballina.
- 1896: Dominick Sidney Browne of Breaghwy.
- 1897: Sir Henry Lynch-Blosse of Athavallie, Balla.
- 1898: William Edward Kelly of St Helen's.
- 1899: Col. William Arthur Gore Saunders-Knox-Gore Esq. of Belleek Manor, Ballina.

== 20th century ==
- 1900: Edmond Arthur Gore Pery Knox-Gore Esq. of Coolcronan House, Foxford.
- 1901:
- 1902: George Bingham, 5th Earl of Lucan.
- 1903:
- 1904: Thomas Henry Bruen Ruttledge of Bloomfield.
- 1905: George Augustus Moore Esq. of Moorehall, Belcarra
- 1906: Joseph Alexander Lambert of Brookhill.
- 1907: Edward Cormac Walshe Esq. DL of Castlehill, Crossmolina
- 1908: Thomas Frederic Lewin of Castlegrove.
- 1909: Desmond Gerald Fitzgerald of Turlough Park.
- 1910: Christopher Guy Orme Esq. JP DL of Owenmore House, Crossmolina
- 1911: Henry Blosse Lynch of Partry House.
- 1912: Brigadier-Gen. Arthur Corrie Lewin.
- 1913:
- 1915: Frederick James Peregrine Birch Esq. of Massbrook House, Crossmolina
- 1916: Valentine Joseph Blake.
- 1917: Charles Andrew Gallagher Esq. JP of Millview Cottage, Bunree, Ballina
- 1918: Anthony Ormsby Esq. DL of Ballinamore House, Kiltimagh
- 1919:
- 1920: George O'Malley Ormsby Esq. JP of Rathmoy, Ballina
- 1921: Sir Robert Lynch-Blosse, 12th Baronet.
- 1922: Victor Arthur Tilson Shaen Carter Esq. of Shaen Lodge, Belmullet.
