= Custos Rotulorum of Mayo =

The Custos Rotulorum of Mayo was the highest civil officer in County Mayo.

Custos rotulorum is latin for "keeper of the rolls".

== Incumbents ==
- 1663–1682?: Sir George Bingham, 2nd Bt
- 1682–1714?: Sir Henry Bingham, 3rd Bt
- 1772–1773: Arthur Gore, 1st Earl of Arran
- 1773–1786: Arthur Gore, 2nd Earl of Arran
- 1801-1828: James Cuffe

For later (post 1831) custodes rotulorum, see Lord Lieutenant of Mayo
