= James Browne (died 1790) =

Irish politician

The Honorable James Browne (1736/38 – 22 October 1790) was an Irish Member of Parliament and Law Officer. He sat in the House of Commons of Ireland from 1768 to 1790.

He was born in County Mayo, fourth son of John Browne, 1st Earl of Altamont and Anne Gore, daughter of Sir Arthur Gore, 2nd Baronet and Elizabeth Annesley.

He entered Middle Temple in 1755 and was called to the Bar in 1760. He was advanced to the rank of Prime Serjeant-at-law (Ireland) in 1780. He was dismissed following the change of Government in 1782, but was reappointed in 1784 when a promotion to the Bench left the office open. He was dismissed a second time in 1787.He died unmarried in 1790.

Hart suggests that he was a failure as Prime Serjeant, but adds that the office itself was by the 1780s an anachronism. Although in theory, the Prime Serjeant was still the Government's most senior legal advisor, in practice the Attorney General of Ireland had for over a century had precedence over the Serjeants. The office of Prime Serjeant was abolished in 1805 following the death of Arthur Browne.

He was an MP for Jamestown from 1768 to 1776, for Tuam from 1776 to 1783, and for Castlebar from 1783 to 1790.

Parliament of Ireland
Preceded by Edward Loftus; Roger Palmer	Member of Parliament for Jamestown; 1768–1776; With: John FitzGibbon	Succeeded by Viscount Westport; Richard Martin
Preceded by Hugh Carleton; William Hull	Member of Parliament for Tuam; 1776–1783; With: Sir Henry Lynch-Blosse, 7th Bt	Succeeded by James Cuffe; David La Touche
Preceded by Stephen Popham; Thomas Coghlan	Member of Parliament for Castlebar; 1783–1790; With: Thomas Warren	Succeeded by John Francis Cradock; Edward FitzGerald
