= Paul Annesley Gore =

Irish politician

Paul Annesley Gore (c. 1703 – 1780) was an Irish politician. He was the second son of Sir Arthur Gore, 2nd Baronet, and Elizabeth Annesley, and younger brother of Arthur Gore, 1st Earl of Arran.

He sat in the House of Commons of Ireland, as a Member of Parliament for County Mayo from 1751 to 1760, and for County Sligo from 1765 to 1768.

Parliament of Ireland
Preceded by James Cuffe; Sir John Bingham, 6th Bt	Member of Parliament for County Mayo; 1751–1761; With: James Cuffe	Succeeded by Hon. Peter Browne-Kelly; Sir Charles Bingham, 7th Bt
Preceded by Owen Wynne; Sir Edward King, 5th Bt	Member of Parliament for County Sligo; 1765–1768; With: Owen Wynne	Succeeded by Owen Wynne; Joshua Cooper
