= William Tonson, 1st Baron Riversdale =

Irish landowner, soldier and peer

Lieutenant-Colonel William Tonson, 1st Baron Riversdale (3 May 1724 – 4 December 1787), was an Irish landowner, soldier and politician.

Tonson was the son of Richard Tonson, for many years Member of Parliament for Baltimore, by his second wife Peniel Gates, daughter of a Colonel Gates. He was a lieutenant-colonel in the 53rd Regiment of Foot and served in the Spanish invasion of Portugal in 1762 under William, Count of Schaumburg-Lippe. In 1768 he was returned to the Irish House of Commons for Tuam, a seat he held until 1776, and then represented Rathcormack until 1783. The latter year he was raised to the Irish peerage as Baron Riversdale, of Rathcormack in the County of Cork.

Lord Riversdale married Rose Bernard, daughter of James Bernard and sister of the 1st Earl of Bandon, in 1773. They had eight sons and two daughters. He died in December 1787, aged 63, and was succeeded by his second but eldest surviving son, William. Riversdale's eighth and youngest son, Ludlow, who eventually succeeded in the barony, was Bishop of Killaloe and Clonfert.

Parliament of Ireland
Preceded by Henry Bingham; Henry Bingham	Member of Parliament for Tuam; 1768–1776; With: Richard Power 1768–1772; Hugh Carleton 1772–1776	Succeeded by James Browne; Sir Henry Lynch-Blosse, Bt
Preceded by Abraham Devonsher; James Barry	Member of Parliament for Rathcormack; 1776–1783; With: Francis Bernard Beamish	Succeeded by Charles Francis Sheridan; Sackville Hamilton
Peerage of Ireland
New creation	Baron Riversdale; 1783–1787	Succeeded by William Tonson
