= Castlebar (Parliament of Ireland constituency) =

Pre-1801 Irish constituency

- Former borough constituency for the Irish House of Commons
- County: County Mayo
- Borough: Castlebar

1614–1801
- Replaced by: Disfranchised

Castlebar was a constituency represented in the Irish House of Commons from 1614 to 1800. The area is in County Mayo. Between 1725 and 1793 Catholics and those who were married to Catholics could not vote.

== History ==
In the Patriot Parliament of 1689 summoned by James II, Castlebar was represented with two members.

== Members of Parliament, 1613–1801 ==
- 1613–1615 Sir John Bingham and Thomas Peyton
- 1634–1635 Sir Henry Bingham, 1st Bt
- 1639–1648 Sir Henry Bingham, 1st Bt and Sir George Carr
- 1661–1666 Sir George Bingham, 2nd Bt and William Rowse (AWOL and replaced 1665 by Sir Hugh Middleton, 3rd Baronet)

=== 1689–1801 ===
Election	First MP	Second MP
1689	John Bermingham	Thomas Bourke
1692	John Bingham	Robert Ormsby (Note: Also elected for Galway Town in 1695, for which he chose to sit)
August 1695	William Palmer	Robert Ormsby
1695	William Palmer	Edward Eyre
1703	William Palmer	Gerald Cuffe
1713	Sir George Browne, 4th Bt	Gerald Cuffe
1715	John Bingham	Henry Bingham
1727	John Wynne	Henry Bingham
1744	John Wynne	John Browne
1747	Henry Mitchell	John Browne
May 1761	Joshua Cooper	Sir Charles Bingham, 7th Bt (Note: Also elected for County Mayo in 1761, for which he chose to sit.)
1761	Joshua Cooper	Richard Gore
1768	John Knox	Edward Kirwan
1775	John William Hamilton	Edward Kirwan
1776	Stephen Popham	Thomas Coghlan
1783	James Browne	Thomas Warren
1790	Edward FitzGerald	John Francis Cradock
January 1798	Thomas Lindsay	Denis Browne (Note: Also elected for County Mayo in 1798, for which he chose to sit.)
1798	Thomas Lindsay	Thomas Lindsay
1800	George Miller	Thomas Lindsay
1801	Disenfranchised	

== Bibliography ==
- O'Hart, John (2007). The Irish and Anglo-Irish Landed Gentry: When Cromwell came to Ireland. Vol. II. Heritage Books. ISBN 0-7884-1927-7.
- Leigh Rayment's historical List of Members of the Irish House of Commons. Cites: Johnston-Liik, Edith Mary (2002). The History of the Irish Parliament 1692-1800 (6 volumes). Ulster Historical Foundation.
