= Sir George Browne, 4th Baronet =

Irish politician, died 1737

Sir George Browne, 4th Baronet (1680s – 8 May 1737) was an Irish politician.

He sat in the House of Commons of Ireland from 1713 to 1714, as a Member of Parliament for Castlebar.

Parliament of Ireland
Preceded by Gerald Cuffe; William Palmer	Member of Parliament for Castlebar; 1713 – 1714; With: Gerald Cuffe	Succeeded by Henry Bingham; John Bingham
Baronetage of Nova Scotia
Preceded by John Browne	Baronet (of The Neale, Mayo) c. 1712 – 1737	Succeeded by John Browne
