= Hugh Carleton, 1st Viscount Carleton =

Irish politician and judge

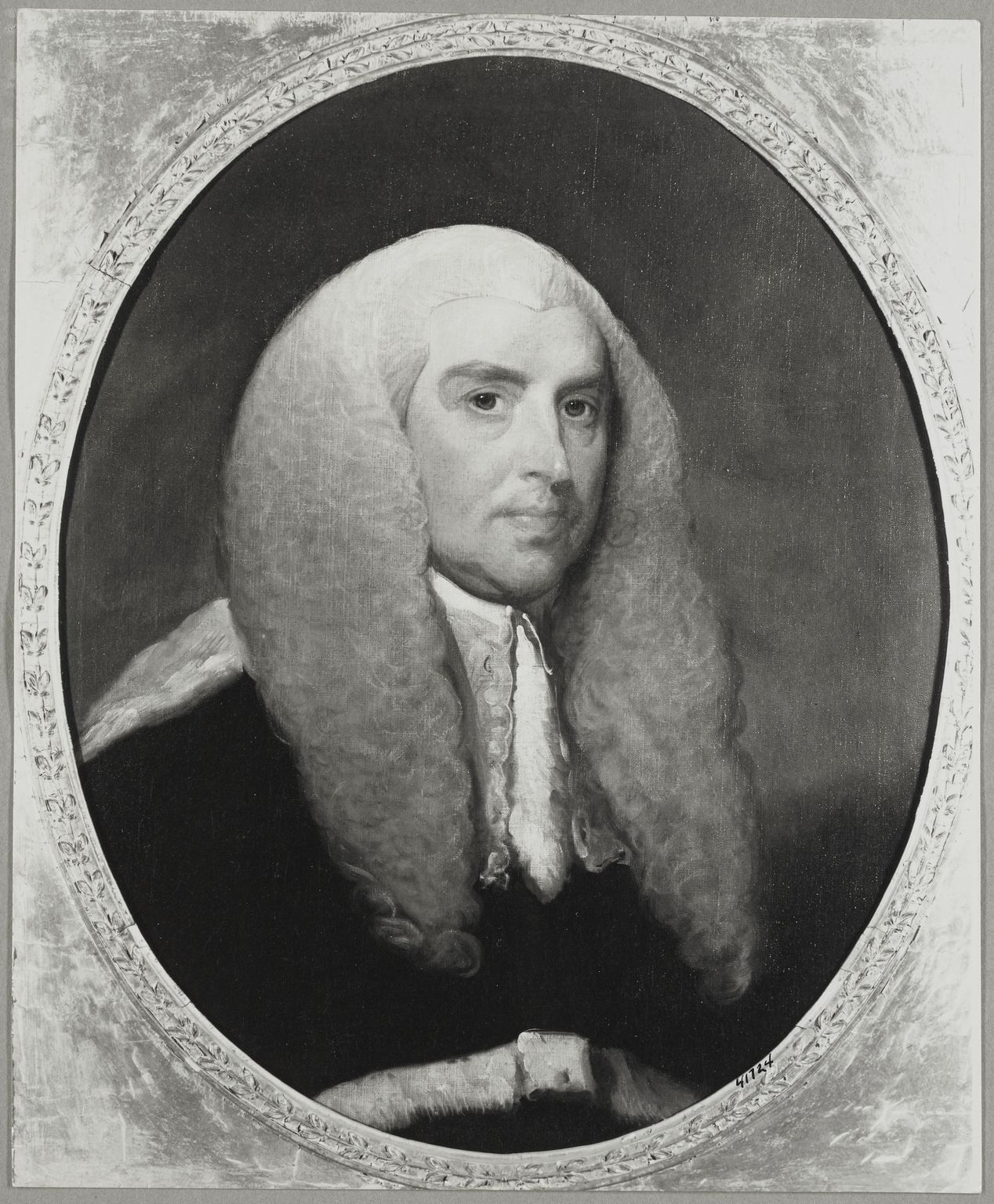

Member of the Ireland Parliament for Tuam
- In office 1772–1776

Member of the Ireland Parliament for Philipstown
- In office 1776–1783

Member of the Ireland Parliament for Naas
- In office 1783–1787

Chief Justice of the Irish Common Pleas
- In office 1787–1800

Representative peer for Ireland
- In office 1800–1826

Viscount Carleton
- In office 1797–1826

Personal details
- Born: 11 September 1739
- Died: 25 February 1826 (aged 86) London, UK
- Spouses: Elizabeth Mercer; Mary Buckley Mathew
- Parents: Francis Carleton; Rebecca Lawton

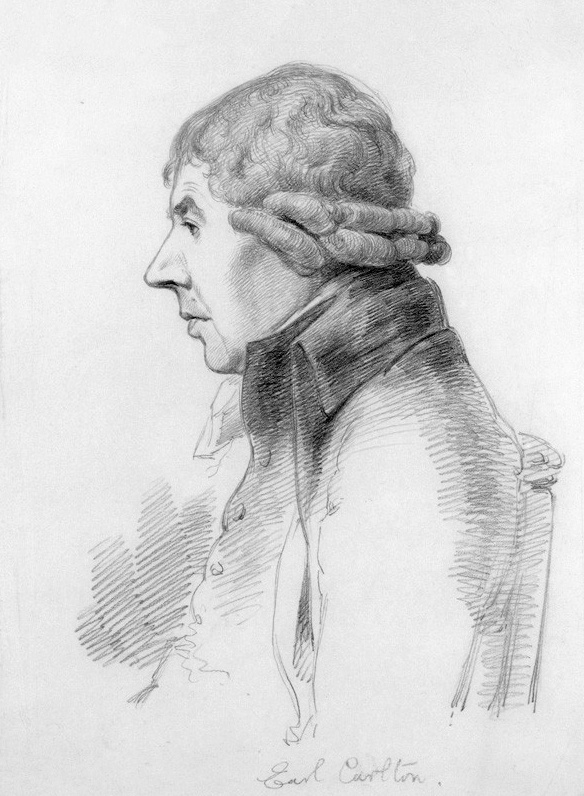
Lord Carleton

Hugh Carleton MRIA, 1st Viscount Carleton, PC (I), SL (11 September 1739 – 25 February 1826) was an Irish politician and judge.

== Early life ==
Carleton was possibly born in Cork city, son of Francis Carleton (1713–1791) and Rebecca (d.1791), daughter of Hugh Lawton of Castle Jane and Lake Marsh, County Cork. His father was a wealthy merchant from a family which settled in Cork in the time of Charles I; he was also a powerful local politician, popularly known as "the King of Cork" for his opulence and respectability. Hugh's maternal grandfather, Hugh Lawton, was a member of the Lawton family of Lawton Hall, Cheshire, who came to Ireland in 1689 with William III. Hugh Carleton was educated at Kilkenny College, where he became friends with John Scott who stood up for him and protected him against bullying. In gratitude, Hugh's father became patron to Scott, the future Earl of Clonmell, and sent both the boys off to Trinity College Dublin and Middle Temple with equal allowances.

Hugh matriculated at Dublin in 1755 and entered Middle Temple in 1758. He was called to the Irish Bar in 1764, becoming King's Counsel in 1768.

== Political career ==
Given his father's political influence Carleton was assured of a seat in the Irish House of Commons: he was elected member for Tuam in 1772, for Philipstown in 1776 and for Naas in 1783. As a politician he was not a success: M.P.s complained his speeches were inaudible, though this fault did not prevent him from becoming a highly successful barrister.

== Judicial career ==
Carleton was appointed Recorder of Cork in 1769, Third Serjeant in 1776 and Second Serjeant in 1777. He became Solicitor General for Ireland in 1779 and Chief Justice of the Irish Common Pleas from 1787 to 1800. In 1787 he was invested as a member of the Privy Council of Ireland.

In 1788 he became a member of the Royal Irish Academy. He was raised to the Peerage of Ireland as Baron Carleton, of Anner in the County of Tipperary, on 17 September 1789, "to provide additional legal expertise for the House of Lords in its recently restored capacity as the final court of appeal in Ireland" and to balance against the influence of other members who were seen as less supportive of the government. He was further honoured when he was made Viscount Carleton, of Clare in the County of Tipperary, on 21 November 1797, also in the Irish peerage. Following the implementation of the Acts of Union 1800 he was elected as one of the original 28 Irish representative peers. On his death without issue in 1826, both titles became extinct.

He was active in suppressing the Irish Rebellion of 1798, and presided over the trial and condemnation of the Sheares brothers, Henry and John, who were executed for their part in the Rebellion. He was widely criticised for hearing the case, as their father had appointed him the boys' guardian, and he became an object of particular hatred among the United Irishmen.

Lord Carleton was highly regarded as a judge, but his notorious hypochondria made him a subject of some ridicule since like many hypochondriacs he in fact enjoyed excellent health. His decision to retire on the ground of ill health at 60 was greeted with derision, which was fully justified since he survived for another quarter century. His former schoolfriend John Scott, Lord Clonmell, whose diary is full of savage attacks on his colleagues, describes Carleton as "a worthless wretch, though I am his maker"; but no one else seems to have shared this view. His manner in Court was notably gloomy: John Philpot Curran joked that in every case he heard, Carleton was plaintiff (plaintive). His portrait confirms that he was a man of solemn appearance.

== Personal life ==
He married firstly on 2 August 1766 Elizabeth Mercer of Dublin, daughter of Richard Mercer and Elizabeth Godbey, who died in 1794. He married secondly in the following year Mary Buckley Mathew of Dorset, daughter of Abednego Mathew and his estranged wife Jennett Buckley of Saint Kitts. Both his wife's parents were wealthy slaveowners in Saint Kitts. Mary died in 1810. He had no children by either marriage.

He was deeply shaken by the murder of his colleague Arthur Wolfe, 1st Viscount Kilwarden, during the Irish rebellion of 1803, especially as there was a rumour that Kilwarden had been murdered by mistake. Carleton was said by some to be the real target, in revenge for his condemnation of the Sheares brothers in 1798. The rumour was almost certainly false since the eyewitnesses to the murder agreed that Kilwarden was killed only after giving his name and office, and was in great fear of his life during the Rebellion.

He lived at Willow Park, Booterstown and at a succession of townhouses in Dublin. In his last years he lived in London and died at Hanover Square. His pamphlet collection, comprising 158 bound volumes, was purchased by the library of Lincoln's Inn in 1842.

== Notes ==
Parliament of Ireland
Preceded by William Tonson; Richard Power	Member of Parliament for Tuam; 1772–1776; With: William Tonson	Succeeded by James Browne; Sir Henry Lynch-Blosse
Preceded by Duke Tyrrell; Richard Rochfort-Mervyn	Member of Parliament for Philipstown; 1776–1783; With: John Handcock	Succeeded by John Toler; Henry Cope
Preceded by Hon. John Bourke; Thomas Allan	Member of Parliament for Naas; 1783–1787; With: Lord Naas	Succeeded by Lord Naas; Sir Richard Gorges-Meredyth
Legal offices
Preceded by Robert Hellen	Solicitor-General for Ireland; 1779–1787	Succeeded by Arthur Wolfe
Preceded by Marcus Paterson	Chief Justice of the Irish Common Pleas; 1787–1800	Succeeded by The Lord Norbury
Parliament of the United Kingdom
New title	Representative peer for Ireland; 1800–1826	Succeeded by The Earl Mount Cashell
Peerage of Ireland
New creation	Viscount Carleton; 1797–1826	Extinct
New creation	Baron Carleton; 1789–1826	Extinct
