= John Wynne (died 1747) =

Irish politician

John Wynne (c. 1690 – 9 February 1747) was an Irish politician.

He sat in the House of Commons of Ireland from 1727 to 1747 as a Member of Parliament for Castlebar.

Parliament of Ireland
Preceded by Henry Bingham; John Bingham	Member of Parliament for Castlebar; 1727–1747; With: Henry Bingham to 1744; John Browne from 1744	Succeeded by John Browne; Henry Mitchell
