= Arthur Gore, 1st Earl of Arran =

Irish politician

Arthur Gore, 1st Earl of Arran PC (Ire) (1703 – 17 April 1773), known as Sir Arthur Gore, 3rd Baronet from 1741 to 1757 and as Viscount Sudley from 1758 to 1762, was an Irish politician.

Arran was the son of Sir Arthur Gore, 2nd Baronet, and Elizabeth Annesley, and was educated at Trinity College, Dublin. In 1727 he was elected to the Irish House of Commons for Donegal Borough, a seat he held until 1758. He was also High Sheriff of Wexford in 1738 and was admitted to the Irish Privy Council in 1748. In 1758 he was raised to the Peerage of Ireland as Baron Saunders, of Deeps in the County of Wexford, and Viscount Sudley, of Castle Gore in the County of Mayo. In 1762 he was further honoured when he was created Earl of Arran, of the Arran Islands in the County of Galway. This was the third occasion that the title Earl of Arran had been created in the Peerage of Ireland.

His sister Anne married John Browne, 1st Earl of Altamont in December 1729 and had ten children. Another sister Elizabeth married James Cuffe, and was the mother of seven children including James Cuffe, 1st Baron Tyrawley. Lord Arran married Jane Saunders, daughter of Richard Saunders (a grandson of the MP Henry Whitfield), in 1731. They had three sons and two daughters. He died in April 1773 and was succeeded in his titles by his eldest son Arthur.

== Notes ==
Parliament of Ireland
Preceded by Henry Maxwell; Alexander Montgomery	Member of Parliament for Donegal Borough; 1727–1758; With: Henry Maxwell 1727–1730; John Folliott 1730–1758	Succeeded by John Folliott; Hon. Arthur Saunders Gore
Peerage of Ireland
New creation	Earl of Arran; 1762–1773	Succeeded by Arthur Saunders Gore
New creation	Viscount Sudley; 1758–1773	Succeeded by Arthur Saunders Gore
Baronetage of Ireland
Preceded by Arthur Gore	Baronet (of Newtown); 1741–1773	Succeeded by Arthur Saunders Gore
