= Charles Bingham, 1st Earl of Lucan =

Irish peer and politician (1735-1799)

The Right Honourable The Earl of Lucan
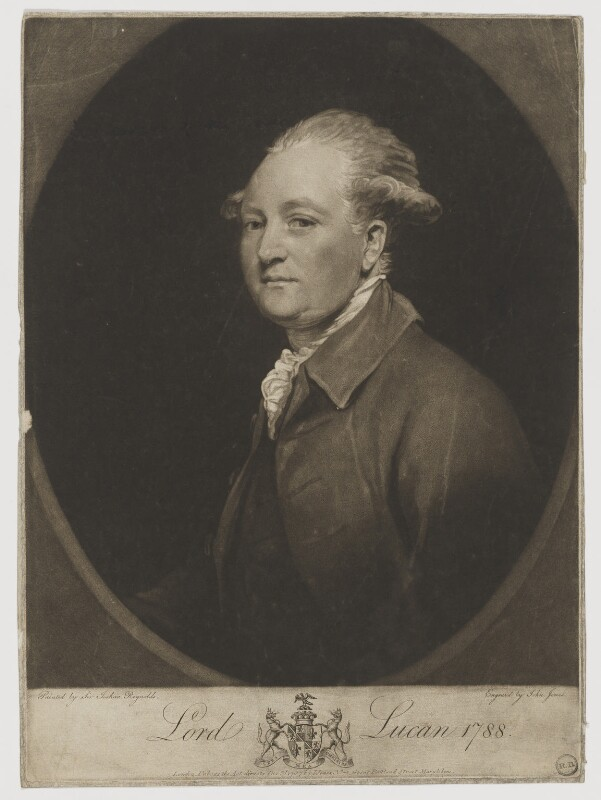
- Charles Bingham, 1st Earl of Lucan

Member of Parliament for Northampton
- In office 1782–1784 Serving with George Rodney
- Preceded by: Viscount Althorpe; George Rodney
- Succeeded by: Lord Compton; Fiennes Trotman

Member of Parliament for County Mayo
- In office 1761–1776 Serving with Hon. Peter Browne-Kelly (1761–68); James Cuffe II (1768–76)
- Preceded by: James Cuffe I Paul Annesley Gore
- Succeeded by: James Cuffe II; Arthur Browne

Member of Parliament for Castlebar
- In office 1761–1761 Serving with Joshua Cooper
- Preceded by: Henry Mitchell; John Browne
- Succeeded by: Joshua Cooper; Richard Gore

Personal details
- Born: 22 September 1735
- Died: 29 March 1799 (aged 63) Charles Street, London
- Spouse: Margaret Smith (m. 1760)
- Children: 5
- Parents: Sir John Bingham (father); Anne Vesey (mother)
- Relatives: Agmondesham Vesey (maternal grandfather); John Bingham (brother); Richard Bingham (son); Lavinia Bingham (daughter)

Charles Bingham, 1st Earl of Lucan (22 September 1735 – 29 March 1799), known as Sir Charles Bingham, 7th Baronet, from 1750 until 1776, was an Irish peer and politician.

== Background ==
He was the second son of Sir John Bingham, 5th Baronet, and his wife Anne Vesey, daughter of Agmondesham Vesey. In 1750, Bingham succeeded his older brother John as baronet.

== Career ==
Bingham was appointed High Sheriff of Mayo in 1756. He was elected as Member of Parliament for both Castlebar and County Mayo in 1761, and chose to sit for the latter. He was returned to the Irish House of Commons until 1776, when he was elevated to the Peerage of Ireland as Baron Lucan, of Castlebar in the County of Mayo. As his title enabled him only to take a seat in the Irish House of Lords, Bingham was not restricted from entering the British House of Commons for Northampton in 1782, representing it until two years later. In 1795, Bingham was further ennobled in the Peerage of Ireland as Earl of Lucan, of Castlebar in the County of Mayo.

== Family ==
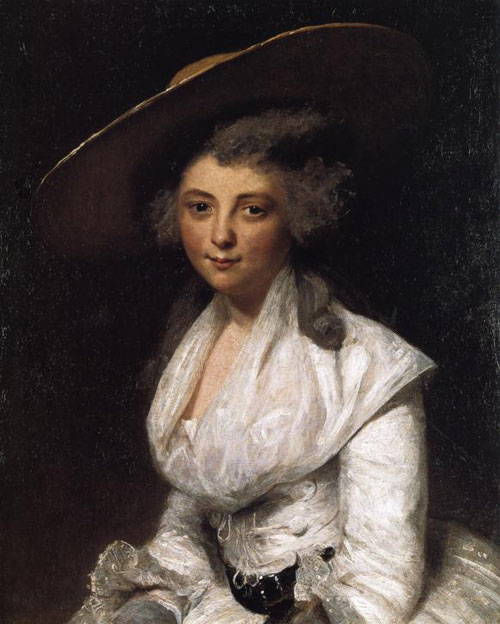
His daughter Anne by Joshua Reynolds, 1786

On 25 August 1760, he married Margaret Smith, daughter of Sir James Smith, at Bath, Somerset, and by her he had four daughters and a son, among which:

- Richard Bingham, 2nd Earl of Lucan;
- Lady Lavinia Bingham, who married The 2nd Earl Spencer;
- Lady Anne Bingham
- Lady Margaret Lindsey; her daughter was Margaret Grey Porter
- John A. Bingham [needs citation for confirmation]

Lord Lucan died, aged 63, at Charles Street, London, and was succeeded in his titles by his only son Richard.

Parliament of Ireland
Preceded by James Cuffe I Paul Annesley Gore	Member of Parliament for County Mayo; 1761–1776; With: Hon. Peter Browne-Kelly 1761–68; James Cuffe II 1768–76	Succeeded by James Cuffe II; Arthur Browne
Preceded by Henry Mitchell; John Browne	Member of Parliament for Castlebar; 1761; With: Joshua Cooper	Succeeded by Joshua Cooper; Richard Gore
Parliament of Great Britain
Preceded by Viscount Althorpe; George Rodney	Member of Parliament for Northampton; 1782 – 1784; With: George Rodney	Succeeded by Lord Compton; Fiennes Trotman
Peerage of Ireland
New creation	Earl of Lucan; 1795–1799	Succeeded by Richard Bingham
New creation	Baron Lucan; 1776–1799	Succeeded by Richard Bingham
Baronetage of Nova Scotia
Preceded by John Bingham	Baronet (of Castlebar); 1750–1799	Succeeded by Richard Bingham
