= Baron Riversdale =

Baron Riversdale, of Rathcormuck in the County of Cork, was a title in the Peerage of Ireland. It was created on 13 October 1783 for William Tonson, who had earlier represented Rathcormack and Tuam in the Irish House of Commons. His eighth son, the third Baron (who succeeded his elder brother in 1848), was Bishop of Killaloe and Clonfert. The title became extinct on his death in 1861. The Tonson family descended from Benjamin Tonson, Treasurer of the Navy during the reign of Queen Elizabeth I. His descendant Richard Tonson was granted lands in Ireland for his services during the English Civil War and settled at Spanish Island, County Cork. His grandson Richard Tonson was a member of the Irish Parliament for Baltimore for many years. The latter's only son was the aforementioned William Tonson who was elevated to the peerage in 1783.

== Barons Riversdale (1783) ==
- William Tonson, 1st Baron Riversdale (1724–1787)
- William Tonson, 2nd Baron Riversdale (1775–1848)
- Ludlow Tonson, 3rd Baron Riversdale (1784–1861)
