= Henry Maxwell (1669–1730) =

Anglo-Irish politician and writer

The Right Honourable Henry Maxwell

Personal details
- Born: 1669 Finnebrogue, County Down, Kingdom of Ireland
- Died: 12 February 1730 (aged 60–61) Dublin, Kingdom of Ireland
- Party: Whig
- Education: Trinity College Dublin

Henry Maxwell PC(I) (1699 – 2 February 1730) was an Anglo-Irish Whig politician and political writer. He was one of the most influential and active figures in the Irish House of Commons during his lifetime, and was among the most prominent early eighteenth-century advocates of a union between England and Ireland. While he defended the principle of Poynings' Law in his writings, he was an occasional critic of its operation in parliament.

== Early life ==
Maxwell was born in Finnebrogue, County Down, the son of a Church of Ireland clergyman, Rev. Robert Maxwell, and Jane Chichester, daughter of the Rev. Robert Chichester of Belfast. His family were of Scottish and English descent. In 1683 he entered Trinity College Dublin, receiving a BA in 1688. In 1718 he would also receive an LLD from the university. It is unknown if he stayed in Ireland during the Glorious Revolution of 1688 and subsequent Williamite War in Ireland, but he was a firm opponent of Jacobitism. Initially intending to pursue a career in law, he entered the Middle Temple in London in 1693, but left without being called to the bar.

== Career ==
=== MP for Bangor ===
In 1698, he stood in a by-election for Bangor and was elected to the Irish House of Commons as a Member of Parliament; he was re-elected for the seat in 1703. Maxwell's first major political tract was written in 1703, entitled An essay upon an union of Ireland with England. The work argued that a union was the logical solution to the ongoing constitutional conflicts between the Irish and English parliaments, but also sought to reassure its English audience that Irish Protestants did not want independence. Maxwell's authorship of the tract was confirmed in a letter to James Stanhope, which also situated Maxwell as an associate of fellow-Whig Anthony Ashley-Cooper, 3rd Earl of Shaftesbury. In 1703 he introduced the heads of a bill for the naturalisation of Protestant settlers to Ireland and to encourage Huguenot immigration.

By 1704, Maxwell had become established as a core member of the Whig faction of Alan Brodrick in opposition to the administration of James Butler, 2nd Duke of Ormonde. Like many Irish Whigs, he was a firm supporter of the established church. In 1704, he opposed the continuation of Regium Donum payments to nonconformist Irish clergymen, and he was lauded by Archbishop William King for opposing attempts to repeal the Test Acts. He opposed relief for presbyterians alongside Samuel Dopping. In other areas of policy, his views were more aligned to the Whigs and he supported the Whig Lord Lieutenant, Lord Wharton. In 1705, he spoke against accepting the submission of the displaced deputy vice-treasurer, Sir William Robinson. In 1707, Maxwell criticised the Irish Privy Council for making amendments to bills passed by the Parliament of Ireland. In 1710, Maxwell chaired and reported from the Whig-dominated committee of public accounts, which had become one of the most important committees in the Irish Commons. In 1711, a pamphlet, Anguis in herba, attributed to Maxwell, criticised peace negotiations aimed at ending the War of the Spanish Succession.

=== MP for Killybegs ===
In 1713 Maxwell was returned as the MP for Killybegs on the interest of his Whig ally and close friend, William Conolly. Maxwell played a prominent role in the parliament of 1713 to 1714; at the start of the session, he led criticism of the Peace of Utrecht proposed by the British Tory leader, Robert Harley. Later in the session Maxwell was again elected chairman of the committee of public accounts. He was deeply suspicious of Irish Tories, suspecting some of Jacobitism, a belief that was only heightened in the wake of the Jacobite rising of 1715 in Scotland.

=== MP for Donegal Borough ===
Maxwell was elected to sit for Donegal Borough, again under Connolly's patronage, in the Irish election of 1715. In parliament he was elected to the committee of public accounts and chaired a committee which carried out an investigation into the activities of a number of Tory officials, including Constantine Phipps, in the last year of Queen Anne's reign. When Connolly was elected Speaker of the Irish House of Commons in 1715, Maxwell began to be referred to as "the speaker's echo". He nonetheless disagreed with Connolly when Maxwell voted against the Indemnity Bill in 1716.

In 1721, Maxwell supported a bill to establish the Bank of Ireland, publishing several tracts in criticism of those who opposed the bank, including Hercules Rowley. In arguing for the bank, he acknowledged Ireland's subordination to the Kingdom of Great Britain and made a plea that his fellow countrymen take a similarly realistic attitude. Later in the same parliamentary session, he again led criticism of the Privy Council's tendency to amend Irish bills and denounced the practical operation of Poynings' Law. Maxwell remained active in parliament throughout the 1720s; he was twice elected to the committee of public accounts (1721 and 1725) and played a central role in several legislative initiatives, in particular related to the linen industry. By the end of his parliamentary career, he had become a reliable supporter of the Dublin Castle administration. In 1727, he was made a member of the Privy Council of Ireland and in the election of that year was returned again for Donegal Borough.

He died in Dublin on 12 February 1730 and was buried in St Mary's Church, Mary Street, Dublin.

== Marriage and issue ==
Maxwell was married twice. He married firstly his second cousin, Jane Maxwell, the sister of John Maxwell, 1st Baron Farnham. In 1713, he married secondly Dorothy Brice, daughter of Edward Brice, a presbyterian Belfast merchant. As Maxwell died intestate and his three children, Robert, Edward, and Margaret, were still in their minority, Brice, as their next of kin, became their guardian and the administrator of the family estate.

== Political writings ==
- Anguis in herba: or, The fatal consequences of a treaty with France (1701, reprinted in 1707 and 1711)
- An essay upon an union of Ireland with England: most humbly offered to the consideration of the queen's most excellent majesty, and both houses of parliament (1703)
- Reasons offered for erecting a bank in Ireland: in a letter to H Rowley, esq. (1721)
- Mr Maxwell's second letter to Mr Rowley; wherein the objections against the bank are answered (1721)

Parliament of Ireland
Preceded by Sir James Hamilton; David Campbell	Member of Parliament for Bangor; 1698–1713; With: Sir James Hamilton (1698–1707); Charles O'Neill (1707–1713)	Succeeded by Capel Moore; Robert Ward
Preceded by Thomas Pearson; Benjamin Parry	Member of Parliament for Killybegs; 1713–1714; With: Thomas Pearson	Succeeded by Thomas Pearson; Charles Fane
Preceded by Sir Arthur Gore, Bt; George Macartney	Member of Parliament for Donegal Borough; 1715–1730; With: Robert Miller (1715–1725); Alexander Montgomery (1725–1727); Arthur Gore (1727–1730)	Succeeded by John Folliott; Arthur Gore
