= Garret Moore =

Garret Moore may refer to:

- Garret Moore, 1st Viscount Moore (c.1564–1627), Anglo-Irish politician and peer
- Garret Moore (Jacobite) (died c.1706), Irish soldier and Jacobite
