= Sir George Bingham, 2nd Baronet =

Irish politician

Sir George Bingham, 2nd Baronet (c. 1625 – 1682) was an Irish politician and baronet.

He was the only son of Sir Henry Bingham, 1st Baronet and his wife Catherine Byrne, daughter of John Byrne. In 1658, Bingham succeeded his father as baronet. He entered the Irish House of Commons for Castlebar in 1661, representing the constituency until 1666. Bingham was appointed High Sheriff of Mayo in 1662 and again in 1678. In 1663, he became Custos Rotulorum of Mayo.

== Family ==
Bingham married firstly Anne Partiger, 1 June 1661 at St. Benet's, Paul's Wharf, London, and had a son Henry. Anne died c. 1661. Bingham married secondly Rebecca Middleton, daughter of Sir William Middleton, 2nd Baronet, and Eleanor Harris on 5 December 1661. and had a child George. He was succeeded in the baronetcy successively by his sons Henry and George.

Baronetage of Nova Scotia
Preceded by Henry Bingham	Baronet (of Castlebar); 1658–1682	Succeeded by Henry Bingham
