= Donegal Borough (Parliament of Ireland constituency) =

Pre-1801 Irish constituency

Donegal
- Former borough constituency for the Irish House of Commons
- County: County Donegal
- Borough: Donegal

1613–1801
- Seats: 2
- Replaced by: Disfranchised

Donegal was a constituency represented in the Irish House of Commons until 1800.

== Members of Parliament, 1613–1801 ==
Election	First MP		Second MP
1613	William Crofton		Walter White
1634	William Crofton		Gilbert Domville
1639	Andrew Wilson		William Dixon
1661	Henry Brooke (Note: Knighted in 1664)		Thomas Juxon
1689	Donegal Borough was not represented in the Patriot Parliament		
1692	William Conolly	Whig	John Hamilton
1695	William Conolly	Whig	William Gore
1703	Sir Ralph Gore, 4th Bt	Whig	Richard Jones
1713	Sir Arthur Gore, 2nd Bt (Note: Also elected for County Mayo in 1715, for which he chose to sit)	Whig	George Macartney
1715	Henry Maxwell	Whig	Robert Miller
1725	Henry Maxwell	Whig	Alexander Montgomery
1727	Henry Maxwell	Whig	Arthur Gore (Note: Succeeded as 3rd Baronet in 1741)
1730	John Folliott		Arthur Gore
1759	John Folliott		Hon. Arthur Saunders Gore
1761	Robert Doyne		John Knox
1768	Viscount Sudley		Richard Gore
1774	Barry Yelverton (Note: Also elected for Carrickfergus in 1776, for which he chose to sit)	Patriot	Richard Gore
1776	Barry Yelverton	Patriot	James Cuffe (Note: Also elected for County Mayo in 1776, for which he chose to sit.)
June 1776	Henry Vaughan Brooke		James Cuffe
1777	Henry Vaughan Brooke		Robert Longfield
1779	Henry Vaughan Brooke		Henry Cope
October 1783	Henry Hatton		Viscount Sudley (Note: Also elected for Baltimore in 1783, for which he chose to sit)
1783	Henry Hatton		Sir John Evans-Freke, 2nd Bt
1790	William Downes		Humphrey Butler
1797	William Keller		Humphrey Butler
1798	Hugh O'Donnell		William Cusack-Smith
1799	Charles Kendal Bushe		William Cusack-Smith
1801	Disenfranchised		

== Bibliography ==
- Return of Members of Parliament, Part II (1878).
- O'Hart, John (2007). The Irish and Anglo-Irish Landed Gentry: When Cromwell came to Ireland. Vol. II. Heritage Books. ISBN 0-7884-1927-7.
- Leigh Rayment's historical List of Members of the Irish House of Commons. Cites: Johnston-Liik, Edith Mary (2002). The History of the Irish Parliament 1692-1800 (6 volumes). Ulster Historical Foundation.
