= Sir Henry Bingham, 3rd Baronet =

Sir Henry Bingham, 3rd Baronet (1654 – 5 July 1714) was an Irish politician and baronet.

He was the eldest son Sir George Bingham, 2nd Baronet and his first wife, Anne Partiger. In 1682, he succeeded his father as baronet. Bingham was educated at the Middle Temple. From 1682 he was Custos Rotulorum of Mayo. In 1692, Bingham entered the Irish House of Commons for County Mayo, representing the constituency until his death in 1714. He was High Sheriff of Mayo in 1684 and again in 1694.

On 4 September 1677, he married firstly Jane Cuffe, daughter of Sir James Cuffe, he married secondly Lettice Hart née Vesey widow of Merrick Hart. He died childless and was succeeded in the baronetcy by his younger half-brother George.

Parliament of Ireland
Preceded by Garret Moore; Walter Bourke	Member of Parliament for County Mayo; 1692–1714; With: Francis Cuffe 1692–1694; John Bingham 1694–1707; Henry Bingham 1707–1714	Succeeded by Sir Arthur Gore, Bt; Francis Cuffe
Baronetage of Nova Scotia
Preceded by George Bingham	Baronet (of Castlebar); 1682–1714	Succeeded by George Bingham
