= George Browne (died 1782) =

Irish politician

Hon. George Browne (c. 1735 – 22 July 1782) was an Irish politician.

He sat in the House of Commons of Ireland from 1779 to 1782 as a Member of Parliament for County Mayo.

Parliament of Ireland
Preceded by James Cuffe; Arthur Browne	Member of Parliament for County Mayo; 1779 – 1782; With: James Cuffe	Succeeded by James Cuffe; Denis Browne
