= Sir John Bingham, 5th Baronet =

Irish politician

Sir John Bingham, 5th Baronet (1690 – 21 September 1749) was an Irish politician.

He was the eldest son of Sir George Bingham, 4th Baronet, and his first wife Mary Scott. Bingham was educated at the Middle Temple. He was appointed High Sheriff of Mayo in 1721 and was Governor of County Mayo. In 1727, he entered the Irish House of Commons for County Mayo, the same constituency his father had represented before, and sat for it until his death in 1749. In 1730, he succeeded his father as baronet.

By 1730, he married Anne Vesey, daughter of Agmondisham Vesey and had five daughters and three sons. Bingham died in 1749 and was buried at Castlebar. He was succeeded in the baronetcy successively by his sons John and Charles.

Parliament of Ireland
| Preceded by Sir Arthur Gore, Bt; Michael Cuffe | Member of Parliament for County Mayo; 1727–1749; With: Sir Arthur Gore, Bt 1727–1742; James Cuffe 1742–1749 | Succeeded by James Cuffe; Sir John Bingham, Bt |
Baronetage of Nova Scotia
| Preceded by George Bingham | Baronet (of Castlebar); 1730–1749 | Succeeded by John Bingham |
