= John Browne, 1st Earl of Altamont =

Irish peer and politician (c. 1709 – 1776)

The Right Honourable The Earl of Altamont
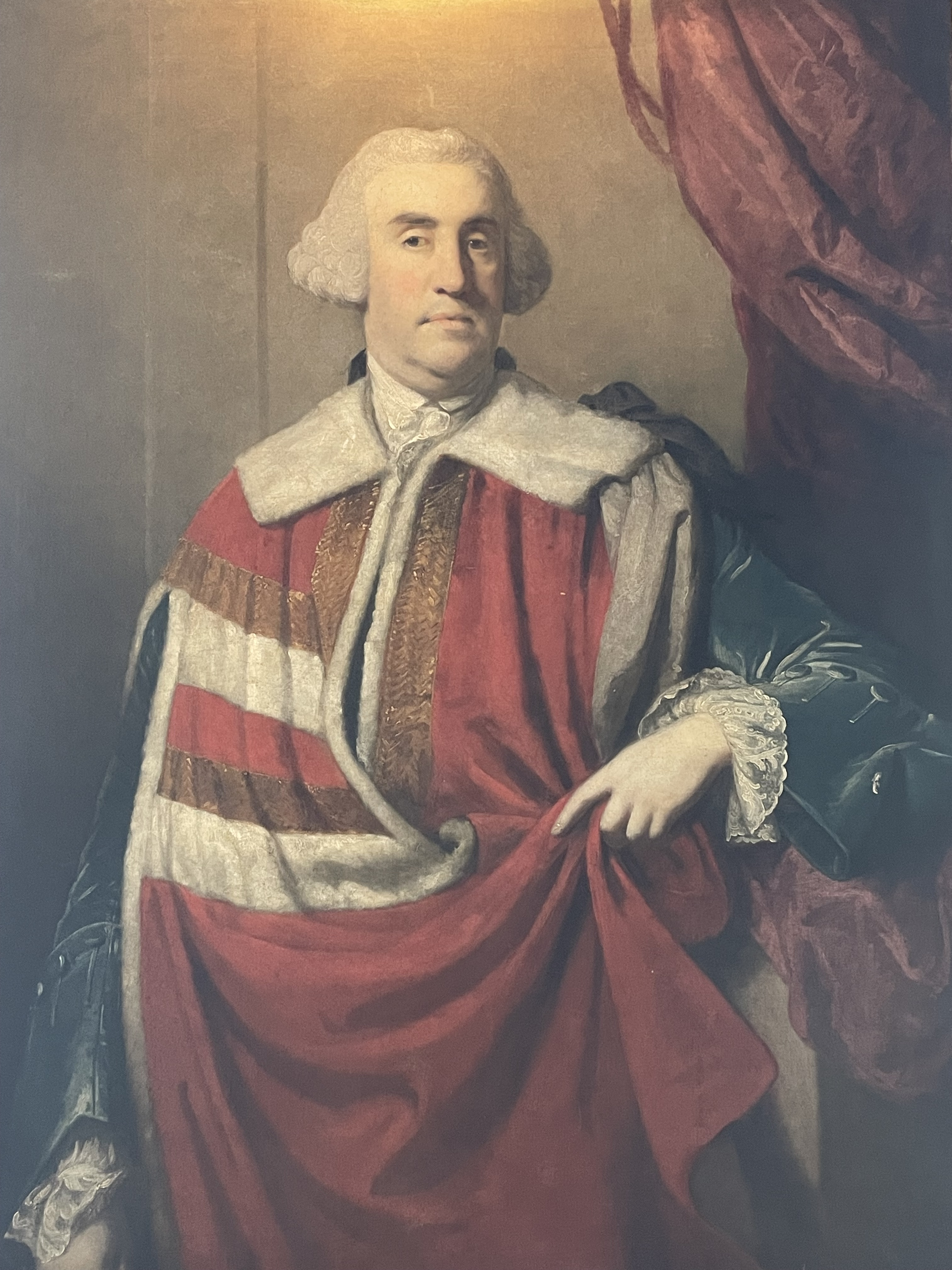
- Portrait by Sir Joshua Reynolds

Member of the Parliament of Ireland
- In office 1744–1760

John Browne, 1st Earl of Altamont (c. 1709 – 4 July 1776), styled Lord Mount Eagle between 1760 and 1768 and Viscount Westport between 1768 and 1771, was an Irish peer and politician. He began the building of Westport House and the town of Westport.

== Background and education ==
Browne was the only son of Peter Browne, a prosperous Catholic landowner in County Mayo, and Mary Daly. He was a grandson of Colonel John Browne, a signatory of the Treaty of Limerick, and of Denis Daly, judge of the Court of Common Pleas (Ireland). His sisters were Roman Catholics but he himself was a member of the Church of Ireland. He matriculated at Christ Church, Oxford, in July 1725.

== Career ==
Browne was High Sheriff of Mayo in 1731, and was elected Member of Parliament for Castlebar in 1744, an office he held until 1760, although he rarely attended Parliament. He was raised to the Peerage of Ireland as Baron Mount Eagle, of Westport in the County of Mayo, and in 1768 he was created Viscount Westport, of Westport in the County of Mayo. In 1771 he was even further honoured when he was made Earl of Altamont, in the County of Mayo.

He was an active and improving landlord, with a particular interest in the breeding of livestock and the improvement of crop strains. He also did much to improve the linen trade in the town of Westport, County Mayo. He also extensively rebuilt Westport House, which remained the family home until 2017.

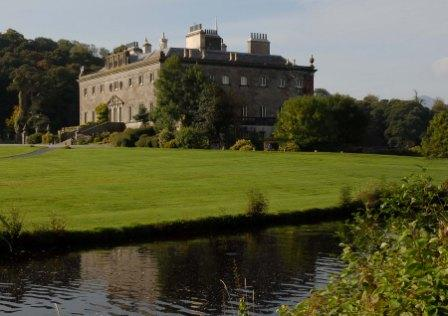
Westport House 2008

== Family and issue ==
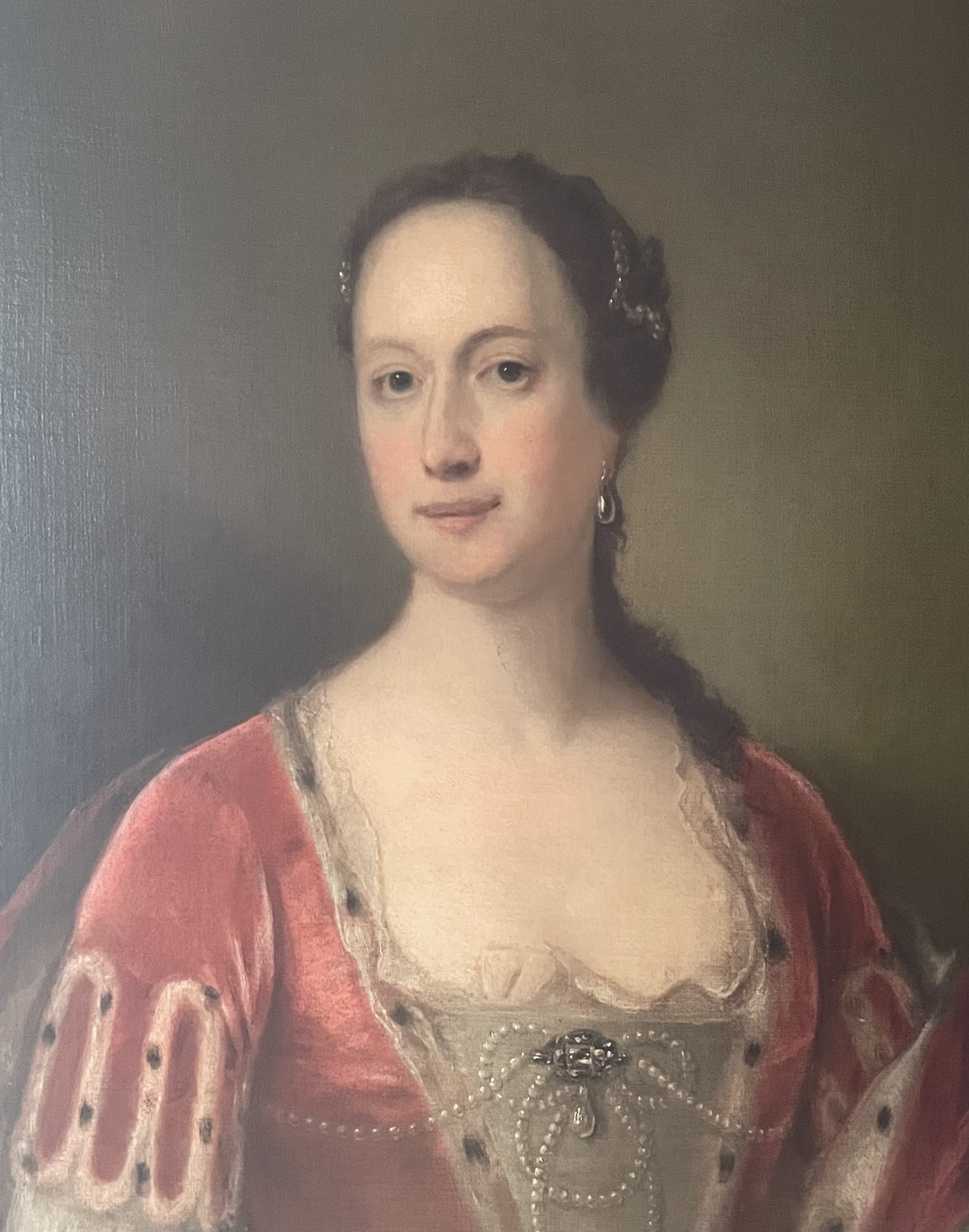
Anne Gore, 1st Countess of Altamont

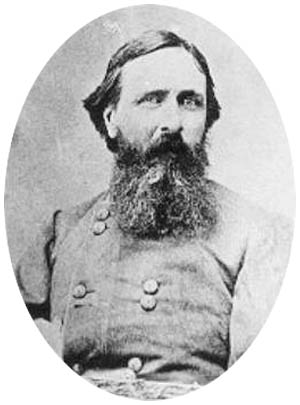
CSA Colonel William M. Browne

Lord Altamont married Anne Gore, daughter of Sir Arthur Gore, 2nd Baronet, and Elizabeth Annesley, in December 1729. Their children – six sons and four daughters – included:

- Peter Browne, 2nd Earl of Altamont, c. 1731 – 28 Dec 1780 from whom descended the Marquess of Sligo.
- Colonel Arthur Browne (14 Mar 1731 – 21 Jul 1779, Boston, New England), served at Quebec, 1770s MP for County Mayo.
- Lady Anne Browne, c. 1740 – 21 Feb 1815
- George Browne, MP for County Mayo, c. 1735–1782; father of Dominick Geoffrey Browne who married Margaret, the daughter of the Hon. George Browne, 4th son of John, 1st Earl of Altamont. Dominick and Margaret were the parents of: A) Dominick Browne, 1st Baron Oranmore and Browne (1787–1860), and Catherine Anne Isabella Monck, daughter of Henry Monck, in 1811. Dominick Browne son Geoffrey Browne-Guthrie succeeded to the peerage; another son was William M. Browne (1823–1883) an officer in the Confederate States Army. B) Henrietta Browne,(1789–1862) married Henry, Viscount Dillon, and was ancestral to Clementine (the wife of Winston Churchill) and to the Mitford sisters.
- James Browne, MP for Castlebar and Prime Serjeant of Ireland, c. 1736–1790
- Henry Browne, (b. 1738; d. 28 Jan 1811, Molesworth Street, Dublin)
- John Browne, married Mary Cocks; their daughter Mary Browne married on 14 May 1800 Peter Blake of Corbally Castle, County Galway (? - 1842, bur. Peter’s Well, County Galway); their grandson Peter Blake of Corbally Castle (c. 1805 - bur. St. Ann's, Dublin, 19 November 1850), was a Galway-born county Inspector of the Irish Constabulary, and married at Mobarnan, County Tipperary, Jane Lane (Lanespark, County Tipperary, 5 March 1819 - ?), daughter of John Lane of Lanespark, County Tipperary; their great-grandson was Sir Henry Arthur Blake.

== Bibliography ==
- Westport House and the Brownes, Denis Browne, Westport, 1981
- Dictionary of Irish Biography, p. 917, Cambridge, 2010

Parliament of Ireland
Preceded by John Wynne; Henry Bingham	Member of Parliament for Castlebar; 1744–1760; With: John Wynne to 1747; Henry Mitchell 1747–1761	Succeeded by Joshua Cooper; Sir Charles Bingham, 7th Bt
Peerage of Ireland
New creation	Earl of Altamont; 1771–1776	Succeeded by Peter Browne
New creation	Viscount Westport; 1768–1776	Succeeded by Peter Browne
New creation	Baron Mount Eagle; 1760–1776	Succeeded by Peter Browne
