= Sir Arthur Gore, 1st Baronet =

Irish politician

Sir Arthur Gore Bt

Member of Parliament for County Mayo
- In office 1661–1666 Serving with Sir James Cuffe

Personal details
- Born: before 1629
- Died: 20 December 1697 (aged 56–57)
- Resting place: St Muredach's Cathedral, Ballina
- Spouse: Eleanor St George
- Children: 11
- Parent(s): Sir Paul Gore, 1st Baronet; Isabella Wycliffe

Sir Arthur Gore, 1st Baronet (before 1629 – 20 December 1697), was an Irish soldier and politician.

== Early life ==
Gore was the second son of Sir Paul Gore, 1st Baronet, and his wife Isabella Wycliffe, daughter of Francis Wycliffe.

== Career ==
In 1656, he was High Sheriff of Mayo and additionally High Sheriff of County Galway. He was appointed constable of Fort Falkland for life in August 1660 and in December of that year he became major of a company of foot. He entered the Irish House of Commons in 1661 and represented County Mayo until 1666.

On 10 April 1662, he was created a Baronet, of Newtown, in the County of Mayo. He served as Sheriff for Mayo again in 1670 and was nominated High Sheriff of Leitrim in 1677.

== Personal life ==
Gore married Elinor St George (occasionally spelt Eleanor in imprecise pedigrees), daughter of Sir George St George (knight of Carrickdrumrusk). They had seven daughters and four sons. Of his daughters, Anne married Colonel John French of Frenchpark, nicknamed An Tiarna Mór (the Great Lord). They were the great-grandparents of Arthur French, 1st Baron de Freyne. Lettice married William Caulfeild, and Eleanor married Edward Wingfield and was the mother of Richard, 1st Viscount Powerscourt.

Gore died in 1697 and was buried at St Muredach's Cathedral, Ballina; his wife survived him until 1713. His oldest son Paul having predeceased him in 1689, he was succeeded in the baronetcy by the latter's son and thus his grandson Arthur. His third son William sat as Member of Parliament (MP) for County Leitrim and his fourth son George was sometime Attorney General for Ireland and a judge of the Court of Common Pleas (Ireland).

Parliament of Ireland
Preceded by Sir Thomas Sadlier	Member of Parliament for County Mayo; 1661–1666; With: Sir James Cuffe	Succeeded by Garret Moore; Walter Bourke
Baronetage of Ireland
New creation	Baronet of Newtown; 1662–1697	Succeeded by Arthur Gore
