= Ludlow Tonson, 3rd Baron Riversdale =

Ludlow Tonson, 3rd Baron Riversdale (6 March 1784 – 13 December 1861), was a Church of Ireland bishop.

Tonson was the eighth and youngest of William Tonson, 1st Baron Riversdale, by Rose Bernard, daughter of James Bernard and sister of the 1st Earl of Bandon. He was Bishop of Killaloe, Kilfenora, Clonfert and Kilmacduagh between 1839 and 1861. He was consecrated on 17 February 1839 and succeeded his brother William in the barony in 1848. He died in December 1861, aged 77, when the barony became extinct.

Church of Ireland titles
Preceded by Stephen Creagh Sandes	Bishop of Killaloe, Kilfenora, Clonfert and Kilmacduagh; 1839–1861	Succeeded by William Fitzgerald
Peerage of Ireland
Preceded by William Tonson	Baron Riversdale; 1848–1861	Extinct
