= Sarah Wewitzer =

British actress and singer

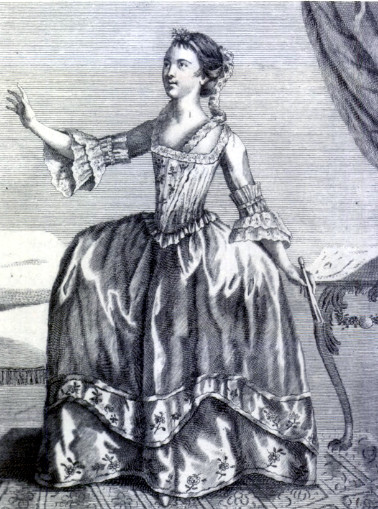
- Born: c. 1756; Prob. London
- Died: 1820; Ballinrobe
- Occupation: Singer
- Known for: becoming "Lady Trelawny"
- Partner: James Cuffe, 1st Baron Tyrawley
- Children: two

Sarah Wewitzer (1756–1820) was a British actress and singer who styled herself Lady Tyrawley in later life in Ireland.

== Life ==
Wewitzer was baptised in 1756 by Peter and Ann Wewitzer. She had Norwegian heritage. She first appeared in a theatre in 1772 where she specialised in the works of Isaac Bickerstaff. Her siblings including her elder sister and her brother Ralph Wewitzer were also entertainers. In 1774 she may have sung at Marylebone Gardens and she may have made similar performances before 1772. Wewitzer appeared at the Smock Alley Theatre where she made her home in Dublin. In 1775, her reputation was compared favourably with the notorious Ann Catley.

Her reputation for purity ended when she set up home with James Cuffe who was the member of parliament for Mayo and had an estranged wife, Mary. They had two sons including James who became an MP. Her partner's wife died in 1808 and Wewitzer adopted her title of "Lady Tyrawley" as Cuffe had been promoted to Baron Tyrawley in 1797.

Wewitzer died on 4 October 1820 at Ballinrobe.

== Legacy ==
A tombstone was placed in Ballinrobe churchyard to Henry Cuff, who died 25 August 1811, son of James Cuff, Baron of Tyrawly. A further tombstone in the same churchyard gives Right Honr. Sarah, Baroness Tyrawly who died 4 October 1820.
