= Sir John Bingham, 6th Baronet =

Irish politician

Sir John Bingham, 6th Baronet (November 1728 – 27 November 1750) was an Irish politician and baronet.

He was the oldest son of Sir John Bingham, 5th Baronet and his wife Anne Vesey, daughter of Agmondisham Vesey. In 1749, Bingham succeeded his father as baronet as well as Member of Parliament for County Mayo, but died a year later. He died unmarried and was buried in Castlebar. He was succeeded in the baronetcy by his younger brother Charles, later elevated to the Peerage of Ireland as Earl of Lucan.

Parliament of Ireland
Preceded by James Cuffe; Sir John Bingham, Bt	Member of Parliament for County Mayo; 1749–1750; With: James Cuffe	Succeeded by James Cuffe; Paul Annesley Gore
Baronetage of Nova Scotia
Preceded by John Bingham	Baronet (of Castlebar); 1749–1750	Succeeded by Charles Bingham
