= Arthur Browne (1732–1779) =

Irish politician

Rt. Hon. Colonel Arthur Browne (14 March 1731 – 21 (buried 26) July 1779) was an Irish politician.

He was a son of John Browne, 1st Earl of Altamont.

He sat in the House of Commons of Ireland from 1769 to 1779, as a Member of Parliament for Gowran from 1769 to 1776, and for County Mayo from 1776 to 1779.

Parliament of Ireland
Preceded by James Agar; John Ponsonby	Member of Parliament for Gowran; 1769 – 1776; With: Henry Prittie	Succeeded by James Agar; John Butler
Preceded by James Cuffe; Sir Charles Bingham, 1st Bt	Member of Parliament for County Mayo; 1776 – 1779; With: James Cuffe	Succeeded by James Cuffe; George Browne
