= Cuff (disambiguation) =

A cuff is the lower edge of a sleeve or pant leg.

Cuff may also refer to:

== Objects ==
- Epimanikia, often called "cuffs", a liturgical vestment used in the Eastern Churches
- Cuff, an inflatable balloon that can hold a catheter in place
- Cuff, a slang term for handcuffs
- Cuff microscope, a form of microscope

== Organizations ==
- Canadian Unihockey/Floorball Federation
- Cuffs (Iowa State University), an Iowa State University BDSM student group

== Other uses ==
- Cuff (surname), a list of people with the surname
- City University Film Festival, or CUFF, at CUNY
- Calgary Underground Film Festival in Alberta, Canada
- Cuff Cape, a headland in Victoria Land, Antarctica
- Cuffs (TV series), a 2015 police drama series set in Brighton, England
- Cuff, NATO reporting name for the Russian Beriev Be-30 airliner and transport aircraft
- Cuff, a slang term meaning metaphorically attaching oneself to another, as in cuffing season

== See also ==
- Cuffing (disambiguation)
- Rotator cuff, a group of muscles and their tendons that act to stabilize the shoulder
- Kuffs, a 1992 film starring Christian Slater and Milla Jovovich
