= Peter Browne, 2nd Earl of Altamont =

Anglo-Irish politician and landowner

The Right Honourable The Earl of Altamont
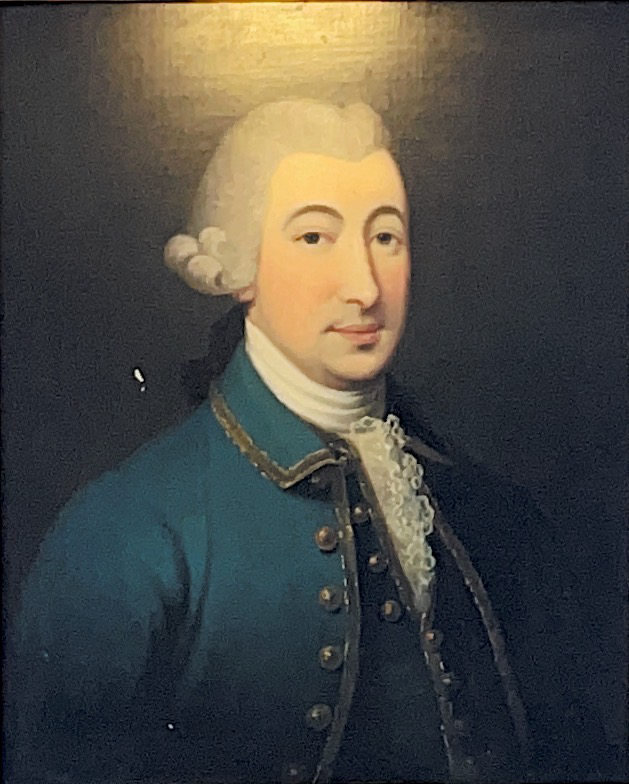
- Portrait by Joseph Hone

Member of the Parliament of Ireland
- In office 1761–1768

Peter Browne, 2nd Earl of Altamont (c. 1731 – 28 December 1780) was an Anglo-Irish politician and landowner. He was the son of John Browne, 1st Earl of Altamont, and Anne Gore, and was involved in organising the construction of the town of Westport, County Mayo with the architect William Leeson.

== Marriage and Estates ==
He married Elizabeth Kelly (1732-1765) on 16 April 1752. She was the daughter of Denis Kelly, former Chief Justice of Jamaica and his wife Priscilla Halstead. Elizabeth was the only legitimate child and heiress of Denis Kelly. The Jamaican slave plantations as well as the Lisduff and Spring Garden estates, both in the civil parish of Tynagh, Barony of Leitrim (County Galway) thus passed into the ownership of the Browne family. The couple took up residence at Mount Browne, a few miles from Westport.

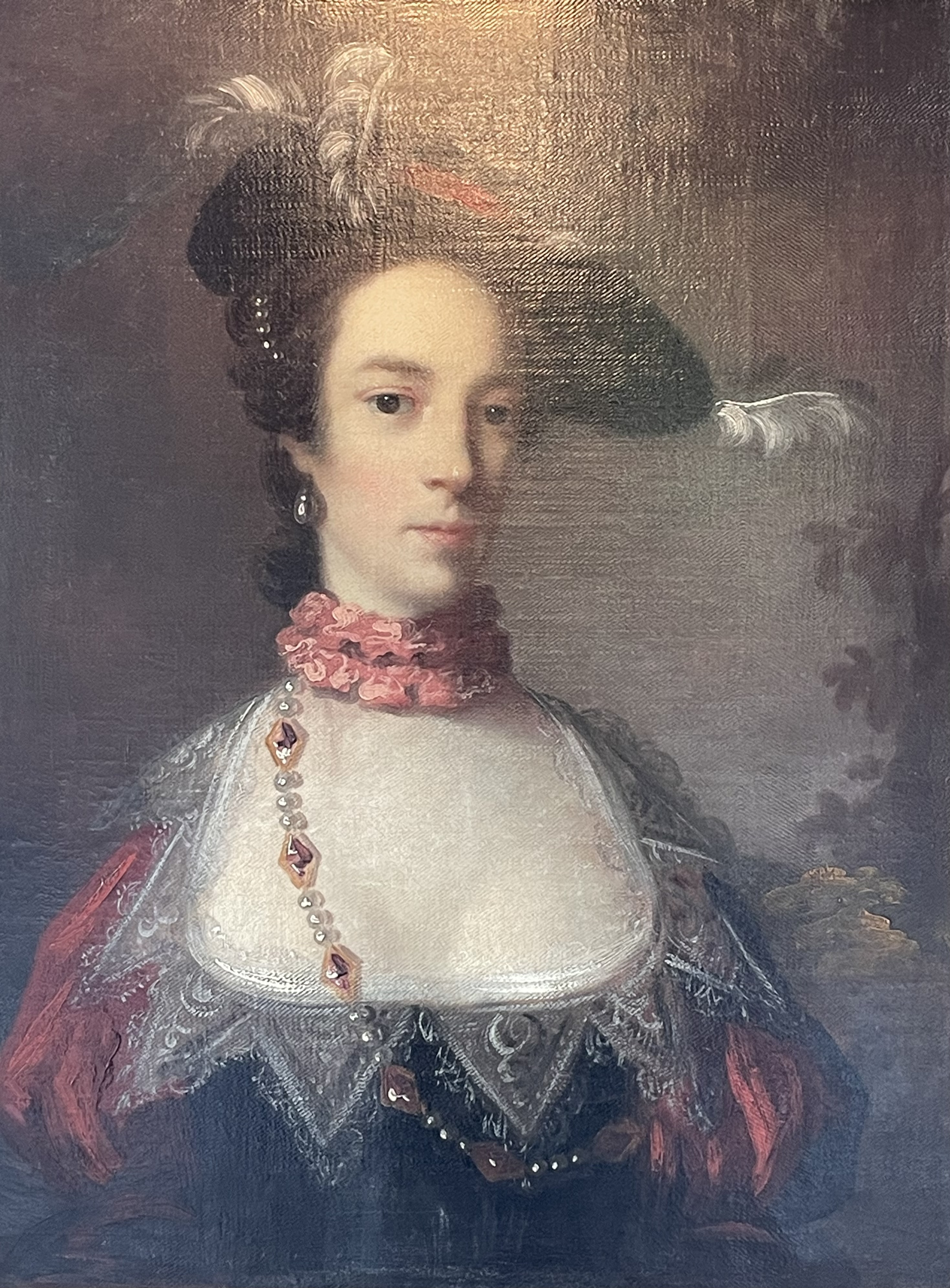
Elizabeth Kelly, 2nd Countess of Altamont

He adopted the additional surname of Kelly. Elizabeth Browne Kelly died at Mount Browne on 2 August 1765, aged thirty-three.

The townland of Lisduff exceeds 264 acres while the townland of Spring Garden exceeds 275 acres.

The Lisduff estate was acquired from Denis Kelly's brother, Edmond Kelly. The estate was enlarged by land purchases in the townland of Drumatober (also in the Barony of Leitrim, Abbeygormacan civil parish) and Garrancarf in 1749, and of the lands of Cormickoge from John Burke in 1750.

Elizabeth Kelly's half-sister, Priscilla Kelly, married Robert Cooper Lee, Crown Solicitor-General of Jamaica. Their daughter, Favell Bourke Lee, married David Bevan, a British banker of Barclay, Bevan, Bennin, Tritton (forerunners of Barclays Bank DCO). This united several aristocratic families of Britain.

Peter Browne was elected Member of Parliament for Mayo in the Parliament of Ireland for 1761 to 1768.

== Issue ==
- Charlotte, born 31 July 1765, married John Mahon of Bessborough, Co Tipperary on 9 January 1794 and died 23 January 1849
- John Denis Browne, 1st Marquess of Sligo
- Denis Browne (politician)
- Elizabeth, c. 1765-1795
- Anne, Countess of Desart, Viscountess Desart, Viscountess Castlecuffe, Baroness Desart (c. 1765–1814), married Otway Cuffe, 1st Earl of Desart

=== Illegitimate issue ===
- Peter Browne, Dean of Ferns from 1794 until his death on 21 July 1842.

Parliament of Ireland
Preceded by Paul Annesley Gore; James Cuffe	Member of Parliament for County Mayo; 1761 – 1768; With: Sir Charles Bingham, 7th Bt	Succeeded by Sir Charles Bingham, 7th Bt; James Cuffe II
Peerage of Ireland
Preceded by John Browne	Earl of Altamont; 1776 – 1780	Succeeded by John Browne
