= Peter Browne (1670–1724) =

18th-century Irish Catholic nobleman

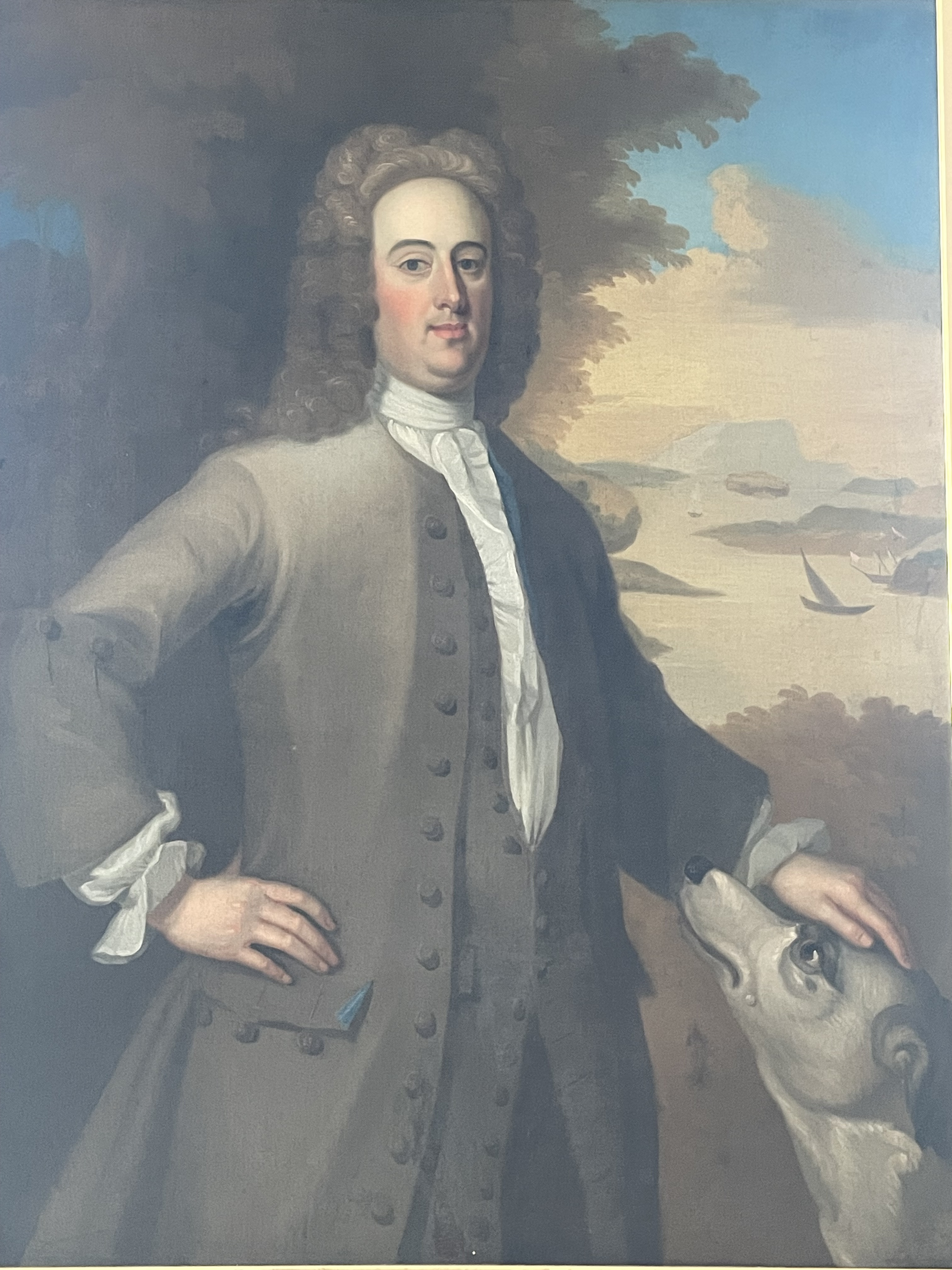
- Born: 1670
- Died: 1724 (aged 53–54)
- Resting place: Burishoole
- Occupation: landowner
- Spouse: Mary Daly
- Children: John Browne, 1st Earl of Altamont
- Parents: Colonel John Browne (father); Maud Burke (mother)

Peter Browne (1670–1724) was the oldest son of Colonel John Browne, a major landowner in the west of Ireland as well as a Jacobite who fought in the War of the Two Kings. A Catholic, the fortunes of the Browne family did not fully revive until the time of his son John, later first Earl of Altamont.

== Family ==
In 1707 he married Mary Daly, daughter of Denis Daly of Carrownakelly The daughters were raised as Catholic, his only son became Protestant.

== Difficulties ==
Peter Browne had once been heir to the richest man in Connaught, however following the defeat of 1691 Peter found himself bankrupt and, as a Catholic, excluded from politics. He lived at Mount Browne, a house built around 1700 near Westport. He made the harbour at Westport Quay. Peter Browne may have intended to improve the local economy for in 1723 he engaged two stonemasons to build a market house wall at Westport. However he died the next year. He is buried in Burishoole, a great Catholic cemetery. The year before he died he presented a chalice to its church.
