= George Rodney, 2nd Baron Rodney =

British soldier and politician

Lieutenant-Colonel The Right Honourable The Lord Rodney

Member of Parliament for Northampton
- In office 1780–1784 Serving with Viscount Althorp (1780–1782); The Lord Lucan (1782–1784)
- Preceded by: Wilbraham Tollemache; Sir George Robinson, Bt
- Succeeded by: Lord Compton; Fiennes Trotman

Personal details
- Born: 25 December 1753
- Died: 2 January 1802 (aged 48) Old Alresford, Hampshire, England
- Spouse: Anne Harley (m. 1781)
- Children: 10
- Parents: Admiral George Rodney (father); Lady Jane Compton (mother)
- Relatives: George Rodney (son)
- Military career
- Allegiance: United Kingdom
- Branch: British Army
- Rank: Lieutenant-Colonel
- Unit: 3rd Foot Guards

Lieutenant-Colonel George Rodney, 2nd Baron Rodney (25 December 1753 – 2 January 1802), was a British soldier and politician.

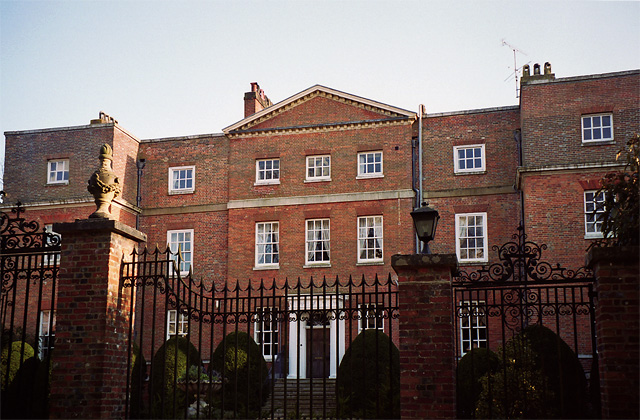
Old Alresford house

Rodney was the eldest son of Admiral George Rodney, 1st Baron Rodney, by his first wife Lady Jane Compton, daughter of the Honourable Charles Compton. His mother died when he was three years old. Rodney was a captain in the 3rd Foot Guards and a lieutenant-colonel in the British Army. In 1780, he was returned to Parliament for Northampton, a seat he held until 1784. In 1792, he entered the House of Lords on the death of his father and inherited Old Alresford House, built by his father at Old Alresford, Hampshire.

Lord Rodney married Anne Harley, daughter of the Honourable Thomas Harley, in 1781. They had nine sons and one daughter. He died in January 1802, aged 48, and was succeeded by his eldest son, George. Lady Rodney died in April 1840, aged 80.

Parliament of Great Britain
Preceded by Wilbraham Tollemache; Sir George Robinson, Bt	Member of Parliament for Northampton; 1780–1784; With: Viscount Althorp 1780–1782; The Lord Lucan 1782–1784	Succeeded by Lord Compton; Fiennes Trotman
Peerage of Great Britain
Preceded by George Brydges Rodney	Baron Rodney; 1792–1802	Succeeded by George Rodney
