= Rappa Castle =

Ruined building in County Mayo, Ireland

Coordinates: 54°08′N 9°15′W

Rappa Castle is a ruined castle located in Ballina, County Mayo, Ireland.

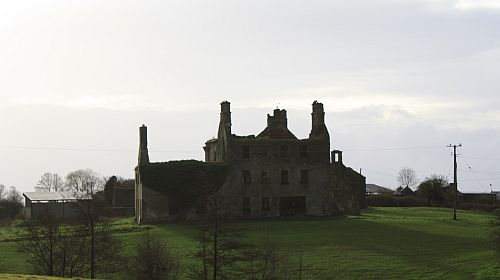
Rappa castle

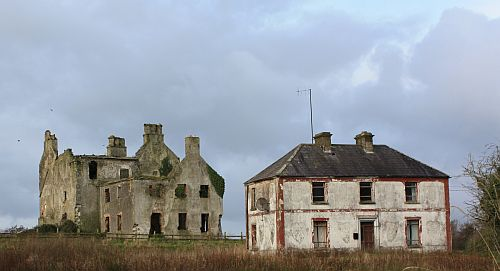
House Built in front of Castle

== History ==
Rappa Castle was held by the Bourke family and was granted to a Cromwellian soldier named Crofton. In the 17th century William Knox of Castlerea (born 1630) married a Crofton of Rappa Castle. The castle remained the home of the Knox family until the 1920s.

Francis Knox, 3rd son of Francis Knox of Moyne Abbey and his wife Dorothy Annesley, was born 1726 and married Mary Gore of Belleek, heiress of Rappa, in 1761. He settled there and was High Sheriff of Mayo. Rappa passed in 1818 to his son Annesley Gore Knox (1768–1839) who was high sheriff in 1825 and father of eight sons. The next occupant, the latter's eldest son Annesley (1798–1878), was high sheriff in 1829. He was survived by three sons, of whom Annesley Arthur succeeded to the estate. He was high sheriff in 1884.

The Knox family left the castle after the Irish War of Independence and it came into the possession of William Gillespie. The Gillespie family which included 13 children lived in the castle until the upkeep became too much. William Gillespie built a new home for the family in front of the house where the family lived until 2001. The remains of the castle stand behind the house.

The castle is a listed protected structure.
