= Richard Bingham, 2nd Earl of Lucan =

Irish landowner and Tory politician (1764–1839)

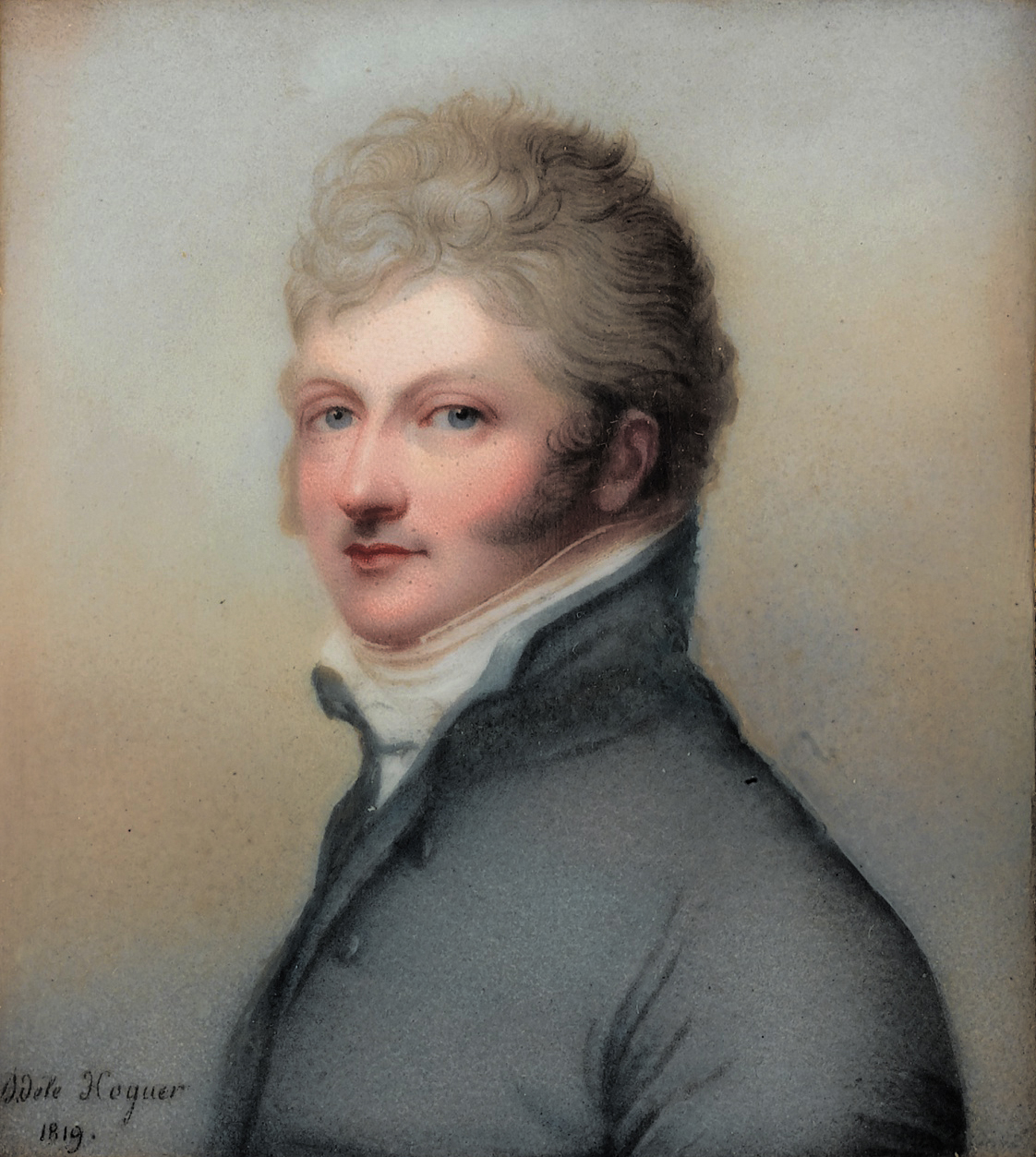
Richard, 2nd Earl of Lucan (Adélaïde-Félicité Hoguer, 1819)

Richard Bingham, 2nd Earl of Lucan (4 December 1764 – 30 June 1839), styled The Honourable from 1776 to 1795 and subsequently Lord Bingham until 1799, was an Irish peer and Tory politician.

== Background ==
He was the only son of Charles Bingham, 1st Earl of Lucan, and his wife Margaret Smith, daughter of Sir James Smith. Bingham was educated at The Royal College of St Peter in Westminster and Christ Church, Oxford. In 1799, he succeeded his father as earl.

== Career ==
Bingham entered the British House of Commons for St Albans in 1790, representing the constituency until 1800. After the Act of Union in the following year, he sat as Irish representative peer in the House of Lords from 1802 until his death in 1839.

== Family ==
On 26 May 1794, he married Lady Elizabeth Belasyse, third daughter of Henry Belasyse, 2nd Earl Fauconberg and former wife of Bernard Howard, 12th Duke of Norfolk, and had by her five daughters and two sons. They separated in 1804. Bingham died, aged 74 at his residence at Serpentine Terrace, Knightsbridge and was succeeded in his titles by his older son George. His second son, Richard Camden Bingham, was a diplomat. His eldest daughter, Elizabeth, married George Harcourt.

He was acquainted with the novelist Jane Austen, who in a letter dated 8 February 1807 reported that "Lord Lucan has taken a mistress."

Parliament of Great Britain
Preceded by William Charles Sloper; William Grimston	Member of Parliament for St Albans; 1790–1800; With: John Calvert 1790–1796; Thomas Skip Dyot Bucknall 1796–1800	Succeeded by William Stephen Poyntz; Thomas Skip Dyot Bucknall
Political offices
New title	Representative peer for Ireland; 1800–1839	Succeeded by The Earl of Dunraven and Mount-Earl
Peerage of Ireland
Preceded by Charles Bingham	Earl of Lucan; 1799–1839	Succeeded by George Bingham
