= Charles Compton, 1st Marquess of Northampton =

British politician

Charles Compton, 1st Marquess of Northampton (24 March 1760 – 24 May 1828), known as Lord Compton from 1763 to 1796 and as the 9th Earl of Northampton from 1796 to 1812, was a British peer and politician.

== Early life ==
Northampton was the son of Spencer Compton, 8th Earl of Northampton, and his wife Jane (née Lawton). He was educated at Westminster, Ealing School and Trinity College, Cambridge (1776–1779).

== Career ==
He served as a Captain and later Major in the Northamptonshire Militia during its embodiment in the American War of Independence. On 18 March 1784 his father appointed him Colonel of the regiment. He resigned the command in 1798. On 18 February 1793, he was appointed a deputy lieutenant of Northamptonshire by his father. He was elected to the House of Commons for Northampton in 1784, a seat he held until 7 April 1796, when he succeeded his father in the earldom and entered the House of Lords. His cousin Spencer Perceval, later Prime Minister, replaced him as Member of Parliament for Northampton. Lord Northampton also served as Lord Lieutenant of Northamptonshire. In 1812, he was created Baron Wilmington, of Wilmington in the County of Sussex, Earl Compton, of Compton in the County of Warwick, and Marquess of Northampton.

== Personal life ==
Lord Northampton married Maria, daughter of Joshua Smith of Erlestoke, Wiltshire, on 18 August 1787. He died in May 1828, aged 68, at Dresden and was buried at Castle Ashby, one of the family seats. He was succeeded in his titles by his son Spencer. Lady Northampton died in 1843.

== Notes ==
Parliament of Great Britain
Preceded by George Rodney; The Lord Lucan	Member of Parliament for Northampton; 1784–1796; With: Fiennes Trotman 1784–1790; Hon. Edward Bouverie 1790–1796	Succeeded by Hon. Edward Bouverie; Spencer Perceval
Honorary titles
Preceded by The Earl of Northampton	Lord Lieutenant of Northamptonshire; 1796–1828	Succeeded by The Earl of Westmorland
Peerage of the United Kingdom
New creation	Marquess of Northampton; 2nd creation 1812–1828	Succeeded by Spencer Joshua Alwyne Compton
Peerage of England
Preceded by Spencer Compton	Earl of Northampton; 5th creation 1796–1828	Succeeded by Spencer Joshua Alwyne Compton
