= Stephen Popham =

Member of Parliament for Castlebar
- In office 1776–?
- Monarch: George III of the United Kingdom
- Preceded by: John William Hamilton
- Succeeded by: James Browne

Personal details
- Born: 5 July 1745 United Kingdom
- Died: 13 June 1795 (aged 49) Conjeevaram, Madras Presidency
- Education: Trinity College, Cambridge
- Occupation: Solicitor, politician, civic activist
- Profession: Lawyer

Stephen Popham (5 July 1745 – 13 June 1795) was a British politician and solicitor who is remembered for improving the residential locality of Georgetown in the city of Chennai, India and reforming the civic and police administration.

== Early life ==
Popham was born on 5 July 1745, the fourth son of Joseph Popham of Gibraltar and Mary Riggs. Popham's younger brother was the British naval officer Admiral Sir Home Riggs Popham. He had his education at King's School and matriculated from Trinity College, Cambridge in 1764. He graduated as 4th Wrangler in 1767 and obtained a Master of Arts degree in 1774. Popham was admitted to the Middle Temple on 14 April 1762.

Popham entered politics in 1776 and was elected to the Irish House of Commons in June 1776 as MP for Castlebar. Popham and was succeeded as MP by James Browne.

== In India ==
Popham's fortunes began to decline in the late 1770s and he faced a financial crisis. He arrived in India about this time and was worked in Calcutta as Secretary to Sir John Day, the Advocate-General of Bengal. In 1778, he travelled along with Day to the city of Madras for an official inquiry. At Madras, a violent argument broke out between Day and Popham forcing the two to break up. Popham stayed on in Madras and purchased a plot in Blacktown and settled down in the city.

Popham purchased the adjacent plot and constructed a drainage channel in the area. He then constructed a wide thoroughfare through Blacktown. The road was named "Popham's Broadway" and presently, it is known simply as Broadway. Popham was critical of the power and influence of the dubashes

Popham recommended the construction of direct and cross drains in every street, the lighting of streets, registration of births and deaths and licensing of liquor shops and outlets. In 1782, Popham submitted a plan for the creation of a regular police force in Madras city.

== Pophams Broadway, Madras ==
The Pophams Broadway at Madras was once a fine road bisecting George Town into Peddanaickenpet and Muthialpet. Before, it was a road, it was a ditch in the suburb called Atta Pallam, and was owned by Stephen Popham, former MP of the British Parliament and later Advocate General at Calcutta, who moved to Madras in 1778. Popham is credited with setting up the Madras Police in 1782. At that time, the lands of the present Madras United Club, General Hospital and Park Town Post Office was a hill called Hoggs Hill (called as Narimedu or 'mound of foxes' by the natives). Hoggs Hill was considered to be a security threat to the Fort St. George and a decision was taken to level the hill. Popham's negotiated with the Government of Madras to use the earth removed from Hoggs Hill to fill up the ditch. The road which came through after filling the ditch came to be known as Popham's Broadway.

== Death ==
Popham died in Conjeevaram on 13 June 1795 as a result of injuries suffered during a fall from his curricle.

== Notes ==
Parliament of Ireland
Preceded by Edward Kirwan; John William Hamilton	Member of Parliament for Castlebar; 1776 – 1783; With: Thomas Coghlan	Succeeded by Thomas Warren; James Browne
