= Stephen Sandes =

Stephen Creagh Sandes (1778–1842) was a Church of Ireland bishop in the 19th century.

A Fellow of Trinity College, Dublin, he was ordained in 1807. He was consecrated Bishop of Killaloe, Kilfenora, Clonfert and Kilmacduagh on 12 June 1836 and translated to Cashel, Emly, Waterford and Lismore in February 1839.

He died on 13 November 1842.

He was the son of William Sandes and Margaret Creagh. He was born at Sallow Glen, near Tarbert, County Kerry, where the Sandes family had been settled for several generations. He married Mary Anne Dickson, daughter of Samuel Dickson of County Limerick, and they had four children.

Among his students at Trinity College was the eminent barrister and author Gerald Fitzgibbon, who remembered with gratitude that it was Sandes who advised him, despite his lack of money or influential connections (Fitzgibbon was a small farmer's son), to persist in a career in the law.

A much younger cousin, who was also named Stephen Creagh Sandes, was the father of Elise Sandes, founder of a welfare movement for soldiers which survives today.

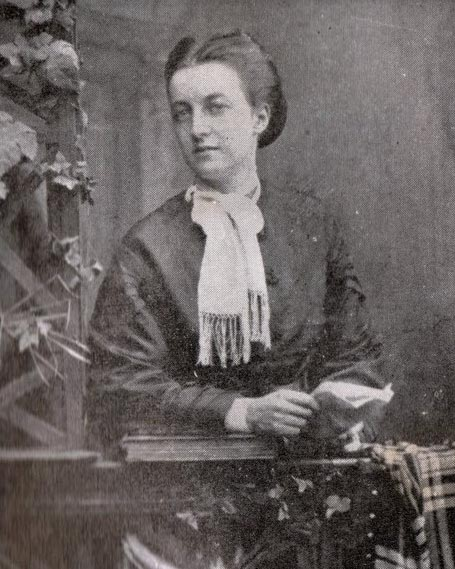
Elise Sands, cousin of the bishop and founder of a leading welfare movement for soldiers

Church of Ireland titles
Preceded by Christopher Butson	Bishop of Killaloe, Kilfenora, Clonfert and Kilmacduagh; 1836–1839	Succeeded by Ludlow Tonson
Preceded by Inaugural appointment	Bishop of Cashel, Emly, Waterford and Lismore; 1839–1842	Succeeded by Robert Daly
