= Cuff (surname) =

Cuff is a surname. Notable people with the surname include:

== Athletes ==
- Anthony Cuff (born 1957), New Zealand cyclist
- Ed Cuff Jr. (born 1961), American golfer
- John Cuff (baseball) (1864–1916), American baseball player
- Katherine Cuff, Canadian professor of economics
- Leonard Cuff (1866–1954), New Zealand cricketer and all-round sportsman, and sports administrator
- Omar Cuff (born 1984), American football running back
- Pat Cuff (born 1952), English footballer
- Ward Cuff (1914–2002), American football player
- Wayne Cuff (born 1971), Jamaican cricketer
- Will Cuff (1868–1949), chairman of Everton Football Club, England

== Others ==
- Agnes Cuff (1890–?), mother of actor Alec Guinness
- Dana Cuff, American architect theorist and professor
- John Cuff (optician) (1708–1772), English scientific instrument maker
- John Cuff (politician) (1805–1864), New Zealand politician

== See also ==
- Cuffe, with a list of people surnamed 'Cuffe'
