= Spencer Compton, 8th Earl of Northampton =

British peer and Member of Parliament

Spencer Compton, 8th Earl of Northampton (16 August 1738 – 7 April 1796) was a British peer and Member of Parliament.

Northampton was the younger son of the Hon. Charles Compton, third son of George Compton, 4th Earl of Northampton and Mary Lucy. He was educated at Westminster School from 1746.

He was elected to the House of Commons for Northampton in 1761, a seat he held until 1763 when he succeeded his elder brother in the earldom and entered the House of Lords. He also served as a Groom of the Bedchamber to George III (1760–63), as Recorder of Northampton from 1763 to his death, and as Lord Lieutenant of Northamptonshire from 1771 to death.

Lord Northampton married Jane, daughter of Henry Lawton, in 1758. He died in April 1796, aged 57, and was succeeded in his titles by his son Charles, who was created Marquess of Northampton in 1812.

== Sources ==
- Kidd, Charles, Williamson, David (editors). Debrett's Peerage and Baronetage (1990 edition). New York: St Martin's Press, 1990.

Parliament of Great Britain
| Preceded by Richard Backwell; Frederick Montagu | Member of Parliament for Northampton; 1761–1763; With: Frederick Montagu | Succeeded by Frederick Montagu; Lucy Knightley |
Honorary titles
| Preceded by The Earl of Halifax | Lord Lieutenant of Northamptonshire; 1771–1796 | Succeeded by The Earl of Northampton |
Peerage of England
| Preceded by Charles Compton | Earl of Northampton; 5th creation 1763–1796 | Succeeded by Charles Compton |
