= James Cuffe (died 1762) =

Irish landowner

James Cuffe (1707 – 20 March 1762), of Elmhall and Ballinrobe, was an Irish landowner in County Mayo.

He was the son of Gerald Cuffe, who built Elmhall and his wife Dorothy Wynne, and grandson of Sir James Cuffe, who was granted the lands of Ballinrobe in 1667. On 30 April 1731 he married Elizabeth, daughter of Sir Arthur Gore, 2nd Baronet and Elizabeth Annesley; they were the parents of James Cuffe, 1st Baron Tyrawley and six other children.

In 1742 Cuffe succeeded his father-in-law as Member of Parliament for County Mayo in the Irish House of Commons, sitting until 1760.

Parliament of Ireland
Preceded by Sir John Bingham, 5th Bt; Sir Arthur Gore, 2nd Bt	Member of Parliament for County Mayo; 1742–1761; With: Sir John Bingham, 5th Bt to 1749; Sir John Bingham, 6th Bt 1749–51; Paul Annesley Gore 1751–61	Succeeded by Sir Charles Bingham, 7th Bt; Peter Browne-Kelly
