= John Bingham (MP for Nottingham) =

English politician

John Bingham (fl. 1388–1467) was an English politician, merchant and coroner. He sat as MP for Nottingham in March 1416 and 1420.

He also served as bailiff of Nottingham from Michaelmas 1395 till 1396; coroner of Nottinghamshire before July 1429; and commissioner of inquiry in Nottinghamshire in July 1434 concerning concealments.

He was possibly the son of Thomas Bingham of Car Colston. He married Margaret, the daughter and co-heiress of Richard Wilford of Wilford, Nottinghamshire and they had one son.
