= Sir Henry Bingham, 1st Baronet =

Irish politician

Sir Henry Bingham, 1st Baronet (1573 – c. 1658) was an Irish politician.

Born at Milton Abbas, he was the son of Sir George Bingham, brother of Sir Richard Bingham, and his wife Cicely Martin, daughter of Robert Martin. Bingham served as captain in the Irish Army. He was nominated High Sheriff of County Galway in 1607 and High Sheriff of Mayo in 1639. He entered the Irish House of Commons in 1634, representing Castlebar from July to November of that year and in 1639 until he retired because of ill health. On 7 June 1632, Bingham was created a baronet, of Castlebar, in the County of Mayo by King Charles I of England.

By 1625, he married Catherine Byrne, daughter of John Byrne, and had by her a son and a daughter. Bingham died by 1658 and was buried in Castlebar. He was succeeded in the baronetcy by his son George.

Baronetage of Nova Scotia
New creation	Baronet (of Castlebar); 1632–1658	Succeeded by George Bingham
