= Middleton baronets of Ruthin (1622) =

Middleton baronets of Ruthin

The Middleton (or Myddleton) Baronetcy, of Ruthyn in the County of Denbigh, was created in the Baronetage of England on 22 October 1622 for Sir Hugh Middleton, 1st Baronet, Member of Parliament for Denbigh Boroughs. The second, third and fourth Baronets also represented Denbigh in the House of Commons. The title became dormant on the death of the sixth Baronet in circa 1757.

== Middleton baronets, of Ruthin, Denbighshire (1622) ==
- Sir Hugh Myddleton (or Middleton), 1st Baronet (c. 1555 – 7 December 1631) MP for Denbigh 1604–11, 1614, 1621–22, 1624–25,1625, 1626 and 1628–29
- Sir William Middleton, 2nd Baronet (10 April 1603 – c. 1652) MP for Denbigh 1630 and 1647
- Sir Hugh Middleton, 3rd Baronet (c. 1633 – 11 December 1675)
- Sir Hugh Middleton, 4th Baronet (6 April 1653 – 2 February 1701)
- Sir Hugh Middleton, 5th Baronet (died 16 November 1756)
- Sir Hugh Middleton, 6th Baronet (1 December 1723 – c. 1757). The title became dormant on his death. Cokayne considered that the baronetcy had become extinct with the death of the last male descendant of the 1st Baronet in 1828.
