= Tuam (Parliament of Ireland constituency) =

Pre-1801 Irish constituency

- Former borough constituency for the Irish House of Commons
- County: County Galway
- Borough: Tuam

1614–1801
- Replaced by: Disfranchised

Tuam was a borough constituency which elected two MPs representing Tuam, County Galway, to the Irish House of Commons, the house of representatives of the Kingdom of Ireland. It was incorporated by a 1614 charter of James I. It originally belonged to the Church of Ireland Archbishop of Tuam, before later passing into the control of the Clanmorris branch of the Bingham family. It was disenfranchised by the Acts of Union 1800.

== Members of Parliament ==
Election	First MP	Second MP	
1613	Sir Thomas Rotherham	Damien Pecke	
1634	Sir Thomas Rotherham		
1639	Sir Thomas Rotherham	Henry Bringhurst	
1661	Sir Thomas Bramhall, Bt; Sat for Dungannon	Geffrey Browne (mis-elected)	
1661	Robert Ormesby - died	Humphrey Abdy	
1665	Sir Richard Lane, Bt	Humphrey Abdy	
1689	James Lally	William Bourk	
1692	Sir Francis Brewster	Gilbert Ormsby	
1703	Agmondisham Vesey	Gilbert Ormsby	
1713	Agmondisham Vesey	Charles Stuart	
1715	Agmondisham Vesey	William Vesey	
1739	John Bingham	William Vesey	
1750	John Bingham	Henry Bingham	
1761	Henry Bingham	Henry Bingham	
1768	William Hull	Richard Power	
1772	William Hull	Hugh Carleton	
1776	James Browne	Sir Henry Lynch-Blosse, 7th Bt	
October 1783	James Cuffe	David La Touche	
1783	Robert Day	Sir Lucius O'Brien, 3rd Bt	
1790	Thomas Lighton	Jonah Barrington	Irish Patriot
1798	John Bingham	Walter Aglionby Yelverton	
1800	George Vesey	Walter Aglionby Yelverton	
1801	Constituency disenfranchised		
