= Michael Cuffe =

Irish politician (1694–1744)

Michael Cuffe (1694 – 24 July 1744) was an Irish Member of Parliament.

The son of Francis Cuffe by his wife Honora, daughter of Archbishop Michael Boyle, his paternal grandmother was the sister of Francis Aungier, 1st Earl of Longford.

Michael Cuffe was born in Dublin and educated at Trinity College Dublin. He was elected to the Irish House of Commons for County Mayo in 1719 - he resided at Ballinrobe - and then for Longford Borough in November 1727, sitting until his death.

His daughter, Elizabeth, married Thomas Pakenham in 1739. Pakenham was created Baron Longford in 1756 and she was created Countess of Longford in 1785.

Parliament of Ireland
| Preceded by Sir Arthur Gore, 2nd Bt; Francis Cuffe | Member of Parliament for County Mayo; 1719–1727; With: Sir Arthur Gore, 2nd Bt | Succeeded by Sir Arthur Gore, 2nd Bt; John Bingham |
| Preceded by James Macartney; John Folliot | Member of Parliament for Longford Borough; 1727–1745; With: Anthony Sheppard 1727–37; Richard Edgeworth from 1737 | Succeeded by Richard Lovell Edgeworth; Thomas Pakenham |
