= Gerald Cuffe =

Irish politician

Gerald Cuffe (24 July 1669 – after 1715) was an Irish politician.

Cuffe was born in Dublin and educated at Trinity College, Dublin.

He sat in the House of Commons of Ireland from 1703 to 1714, as a Member of Parliament for Castlebar.

He was the son of Sir James Cuffe (died 1678) and Alice Aungier.

Parliament of Ireland
Preceded by William Palmer; Edward Eyre	Member of Parliament for Castlebar; 1703 – 1714; With: William Palmer; Sir George Browne, 4th Bt	Succeeded by John Bingham; Henry Bingham
