= James Cuffe, 1st Baron Tyrawley =

Irish peer and politician

James Cuffe, 1st Baron Tyrawley (1747 – 15 June 1821) was an Irish peer and politician.

== Life ==
Cuffe's father was James Cuffe of Elmhall and Ballinrobe Castle and his mother was Elizabeth, daughter of Sir Arthur Gore, 2nd Baronet and Elizabeth Annesley, and sister of Arthur Gore, 1st Earl of Arran.

From 1768 until 1797 Cuffe represented County Mayo in the Irish House of Commons. In 1776, he stood also for Donegal Borough and in 1783 for Tuam, however, chose both times not to sit. He was created Baron Tyrawley on 7 November 1797 and was elected as one of the first Irish representative peers in 1800.

He was appointed Governor of Mayo, a position he held until 1821.

== Family ==
Cuffe had two illegitimate sons Henry and James Cuffe with Sarah Wewitzer, a leading actress. She called herself "Lady Trelawny" but neither of their children was recognised by inheriting their father's title. James was M.P. for Tralee.

Lord Tyrawley's first wife, [Mary Levinge, daughter of Sir Richard Levinge died without issue in 1808. She was the daughter of Richard Levinge (1724-1783) and Alice Marlay. Both her grandfathers were eminent judges.

A tombstone was placed in Ballinrobe churchyard to Henry Cuff, who died 25 August 1811, son of James Cuff, Baron of Tyrawly.

A further tombstone in the same churchyard gives Right Honr. Sarah, Baroness Tyrawly who died 4 October 1820.

James Cuffe's own tombstone reads: "To the memory of The Right Honr. James Cuff | Lord Baron Tyrawly | One of his Majestys | Most Honr. Privy Counsil | Late Barrackmaster Genl. | of | Ireland | who died on the 15th June 1821 | Aged ___ years.." Having no legitimate sons living at the time of his death, his title became extinct.

Parliament of Ireland
Preceded by Hon. Peter Browne-Kelly; Sir Charles Bingham, 7th Bt	Member of Parliament for County Mayo; 1768–1797; With: Sir Charles Bingham, 7th Bt 1768–76; Arthur Browne 1776–79; George Browne 1779–82; Denis Browne 1782–97	Succeeded by George Jackson; Denis Browne
Preceded by Barry Yelverton; Richard Gore	Member of Parliament for Donegal Borough; 1776–1777; With: Barry Yelverton 1776; Henry Vaughan Brooke 1776–77	Succeeded by Henry Vaughan Brooke; Robert Longfield
Preceded by James Browne; Sir Henry Lynch-Blosse, 7th Bt	Member of Parliament for Tuam; 1783; With: David La Touche	Succeeded by Robert Day; Sir Lucius O'Brien, 3rd Bt
Parliament of the United Kingdom
New title	Representative peer for Ireland; 1800–1821	Succeeded by The Earl of Wicklow
Peerage of Ireland
New creation	Baron Tyrawley; 1797 – 1821	Extinct
