= John Bingham (MP for Tuam) =

John Bingham (1714–October 24, 1780) was an Irish politician.

Bingham was educated at Trinity College, Dublin. He sat in the Irish House of Commons from 1739 to 1760 as a Member of Parliament (MP) for Tuam in County Galway
