= Garret Moore (Jacobite) =

Irish royalist soldier and Jacobite

Colonel Garret Moore PC (I) (died c.1706), also recorded as Gerald Moore, was an Irish Royalist soldier, official and Jacobite politician.

== Biography ==
=== Early life ===
Moore was the eldest son of Garret Moore, of Cloghan, County Offaly, while his mother's name is unknown. His year of birth is also unknown, but was likely around 1610. His paternal grandmother was Lady Mary Burke, daughter of Richard Burke, 2nd Earl of Clanricarde. In 1638, Moore was admitted to Lincoln's Inn in London to study law. He refused, however, to take the oaths of supremacy and allegiance required of Irish students in 1641 and was expelled.

=== Royalist soldier and Catholic agent ===
Between 1644 and 1647 he was an agent to his cousin, Ulick Burke, 1st Marquess of Clanricarde, in Ireland and England, including acting for Clanricarde in his dealings with the Confederate Assembly in Kilkenny. He subsequently served the royalist cause of the House of Stuart as an army officer in the Cromwellian conquest of Ireland. As Colonel Moore, he was among the royalist commanders in Connacht who surrendered to parliamentary authority in July 1652. He was transplanted to Connacht where he was granted 3,000 acres in 1656.

From June 1659 he was an agent of the Irish Catholics in London alongside Sir Robert Talbot. In 1663 the pair is recorded as lobbying in London in connection with the Irish land settlement. He was thereafter often at the court of Charles II and he was granted large grants of land in several counties, notably County Mayo, in 1683. In 1677 he was granted a Doctor of Civil Law degree by the University of Oxford when he accompanied the Duke of Ormond to his appointment as the university's chancellor. He was an agent of the Earl of Carlingford in London in 1678. Alongside Carlingford, he was accused of involvement in the Popish Plot in 1681, but does not appear to have suffered any consequences.

=== Jacobite ===
Moore was described by the Earl of Clarendon in 1685 as being among the moderate party of Jacobites associated with the Earl of Clanricarde. Moore is recorded as having written to James II to warn him of the extremism of Richard Talbot, 1st Earl of Tyrconnell. Moore was appointed to the Privy Council of Ireland in 1687.

He adhered to James II after the Glorious Revolution and in 1689 he represented County Mayo in the short-lived Patriot Parliament summoned by James in Dublin. He was appointed Lord Lieutenant of King's County the same year. He served in the Irish Jacobite army during the Williamite War in Ireland as the colonel of a free company.

Despite his Jacobitism, Moore does not appear to have suffered significantly as a result of the Williamite victory. He appears in the journal of the Irish House of Commons in 1695 and 1705 as prosecuting private bills. On 30 March 1705, he was one of the Catholics licensed to carry arms by the Irish Privy Council. Moore married Lady Margaret Burke, daughter of Richard Burke, 6th Earl of Clanricarde. Lady Margaret died in 1671, leaving one daughter. On Moore's death, likely in early 1706, his estates passed to a nephew.

Parliament of Ireland
Preceded by Sir Arthur Gore, Bt; Sir James Cuffe	Member of Parliament for County Mayo; 1689; With: Walter Bourke	Succeeded by Sir Henry Bingham, Bt; Francis Cuffe
