= Ribton baronets =

Extinct baronetcy in the Baronetage of Ireland

The Ribton Baronetcy, of Woodbrook in the County of Dublin, was a title in the Baronetage of Ireland. It was created on 21 April 1760 for George Ribton, Lord Mayor of Dublin between 1747 and 1748. The title became extinct on the death of the fourth Baronet in 1901.

== Ribton baronets, of Woodbrook (1760) ==
- Sir George Ribton, 1st Baronet (died 1762)
- Sir George Ribton, 2nd Baronet (1740–1806)
- Sir John Sheppey Ribton, 3rd Baronet (1797–1877)
- Sir George William Ribton, 4th Baronet (1842–1901)
