= John Browne (sheriff) =

Irish cartographer and sheriff

John Browne (died 1589) was an Irish cartographer and sheriff.

Browne appears to have been a member of the Anglo-Norman Browne family of Kilpatrick, County Westmeath. By his own account, he was "the first Englishman (Anglo-Irish) that in the memory of man settled himself to dwell in the county of Mayo."

In August 1583, while servant to Sir Christopher Hatton, he created town plans of Athenry and Galway, which he sent to Sir Francis Walsingham. That November, he was appointed the first Sheriff of County Mayo. He settled at The Neale, Ballinrobe, on lands thought to have been acquired from the Mac Meyler Bourkes. In the summer of 1584, he prepared a map of Mayo, leaving out the barony of Costello and parts of Gallen and Clanmorris. This map was created at the request of Sir Richard Bingham, and was sent to Walsingham. He was again appointed Sheriff in 1587.

Other maps by Browne included one of Connacht, which was completed by his nephew, John, in 1591, and one of parts of County Monaghan.

Browne and his sub-Sheriff, Donnel O'Daly, were killed in an encounter with Risdeard mac Deamhain and Chorrain and Walter na mBuilleadh Burke at Burrishoole in February 1589 at the start of a major rebellion.

John Browne married Ann, daughter of Thomas Kardyff of Dunsink, County Dublin. From their only son, Josias Browne, descends Baron Kilmaine, Marquess of Sligo and a number of other Browne families in Mayo. They were known as Browne of the Neale, and distinct from the family of Browne - one of the Tribes of Galway - who also settled in Mayo and assumed the title Baron Oranmore and Browne. Other descendants included John Browne of the Neale (1638-1712?); John Browne (died 1762) and Henry Browne, Chief Justice of Jamaica.
