= Francis Cuffe (died 1717) =

Irish politician

Francis Cuffe (after 1675 – November 1717) was an Irish politician.

He sat in the House of Commons of Ireland from 1715 to 1717, as a Member of Parliament for County Mayo.

Parliament of Ireland
Preceded by Sir Henry Bingham, 3rd Bt; Henry Bingham	Member of Parliament for County Mayo; 1715–1717; With: Sir Arthur Gore, 2nd Bt	Succeeded by Sir Arthur Gore, 2nd Bt; Michael Cuffe
