= Pat Cuff =

English footballer

Personal information
- Full name: Patrick Joseph Cuff
- Date of birth: 19 March 1952 (age 74)
- Place of birth: Middlesbrough, England
- Position: Goalkeeper

Youth career
- –: Middlesbrough

Senior career*
Years	Team	Apps	(Gls)
1971–1978	Middlesbrough	31	(0)
1971–1972	→ Grimsby Town (loan)	2	(0)
1978–1980	Millwall	42	(0)
1980–1983	Darlington	110	(0)
Total		185	(0)
- * Club domestic league appearances and goals

Patrick Joseph Cuff (born 19 March 1952) is an English former footballer who made 185 appearances in the Football League playing as a goalkeeper for Middlesbrough, Grimsby Town, Millwall and Darlington.

== Life and career ==
Cuff was born in Middlesbrough, and was an English schoolboy international. He began his football career as an apprentice with his hometown club, Middlesbrough F.C., in 1968. He made his debut in the Football League while on loan at Grimsby Town in the 1971–72 season, but had to wait until April 1974 for his Middlesbrough debut, by which time the club had already won the Second Division title. According to the Guardian's report of the goalless draw with Bolton Wanderers, "Pat Cuff, making his first appearance in the Middlesbrough goal after waiting six years for his chance, did well." He continued as backup to regular goalkeeper Jim Platt until a dispute between Platt and manager Jack Charlton in late 1976 gave Cuff a run in the side.

He finished his Middlesbrough career with 31 League appearances, and moved to Millwall in the 1978 close season on a free transfer. He spent two seasons with Millwall: in 1978–79, he was ever-present with 46 appearances in league and cups as the club were relegated to the Third Division, but then lost his place to new signing John Jackson and never played for the first team again. After three years in the Fourth Division with Darlington, which took his total league appearances to 185, Cuff retired.

Cuff became a bookmaker after his retirement from football. His son Phil played rugby union for West Hartlepool.
