= James Cuffe (died 1828) =

Irish MP

James Cuffe (1778 – 29 July 1828) was an Irish MP in the Irish and UK Parliaments.

== Life ==
He was one of two illegitimate sons of James Cuffe, 1st Baron Tyrawley and the actress Sarah Wewitzer.

Cuffe was elected to the Irish House of Commons for Tulsk in February 1800. The Parliament of Ireland was abolished on 31 December that year. He was then elected to the UK Parliament as MP for Tralee in 1819, sitting until his death in 1828.

He was a trustee of the Irish Linen Board in 1815 and Custos Rotulorum of Mayo from 1800 to death, High Sheriff of Mayo for 1818–19 and Governor of Mayo from 1821 until his death. He was last Constable of Castle Maine between 1810 and his death.

He married Harriet, the daughter of John Caulfeild of Donamon, co. Roscommon

Parliament of the United Kingdom
Preceded by Edward Denny	Member of Parliament for Tralee; 1819–1828	Succeeded by Edward Denny
