= Francis Cuffe (died 1694) =

Irish politician

Francis Cuffe (c. 1654 – 26 December 1694) was an Irish politician.

Cuffe was educated at Trinity College Dublin. He sat in the House of Commons of Ireland from 1692 to 1693, as a Member of Parliament for County Mayo. He was also elected in 1692 for Longford, but chose to sit for Mayo.

He was the son of Sir James Cuffe (died 1678) and Alice Aungier. Some time between 1682 and 1687 he married Honora Boyle, daughter of Rev. Michael Boyle, Archbishop of Armagh, and his second wife Mary O'Brien, and widow of the 3rd Earl of Ardglass. Their children included Michael Cuffe.

Parliament of Ireland
| Preceded by Gerald Moore; Walter Bourke | Member of Parliament for County Mayo; 1692–1695; With: Sir Henry Bingham, 3rd Bt | Succeeded by Sir Henry Bingham, 3rd Bt; John Bingham |
