= Henry Bingham (1715–1769) =

Henry Bingham was an Irish politician.

Bingham was educated at Trinity College, Dublin. He sat in the Irish House of Commons from 1750 to 1768 as a Member of Parliament (MP) in the Irish House of Commons for Tuam in County Galway
