= John Folliott (Donegal MP) =

Irish politician

John Folliott (or Ffolliott; 1696 – 12 January 1765) was an Irish politician.

John Folliott was the son of Francis Folliott of Ballyshannon and his wife Letitia, daughter of Sir James Cuffe. He sat in the Irish House of Commons for Donegal from 1730 to 1760, and for Kinsale from 1761 until his death. By his wife Frances Goodwin he had several children, including the eldest son Francis, who was the grandfather of John Ffolliott.
