= County Mayo (Parliament of Ireland constituency) =

Former Irish House of Commons constituency

- Former county constituency for the Irish House of Commons
- County: County Mayo

1611–1801
- Seats: 2
- Replaced by: County Mayo

County Mayo was a constituency represented in the Irish House of Commons from 1611 to 1800. Between 1725 and 1793, under the Penal Laws, Catholics and those married to Catholics could not vote.

== Members of Parliament ==
- 1585 Thomas Williams and John Browne
- 1613–1614 Tiobóid na Long Bourke, 1st Viscount Mayo and Sir Thomas Burke
- 1634–1635 Sir Thomas Bourke and Sir Roger O'Shaunessy
- 1639–1649 Sir Theobald Bourke, Baronet, and Thomas Bourke
- 1658 Sir Thomas Sadlier
- 1661 Sir Arthur Gore and James Cuffe

=== 1689–1801 ===
Election	First MP	Second MP
1689	Gerald Moore	Walter Bourke
1692	Sir Henry Bingham, 3rd Bt	Francis Cuffe I
1695	Sir Henry Bingham, 3rd Bt	John Bingham
1707	Sir Henry Bingham, 3rd Bt	Henry Bingham
1715	Sir Arthur Gore, 2nd Bt	Francis Cuffe II
1719	Sir Arthur Gore, 2nd Bt	Michael Cuffe
1727	Sir Arthur Gore, 2nd Bt	John Bingham
1742	James Cuffe I	John Bingham
1749	James Cuffe I	Sir John Bingham, 6th Bt
1751	James Cuffe I	Paul Annesley Gore
1761	Hon. Peter Browne-Kelly	Sir Charles Bingham, 7th Bt
1768	James Cuffe II	Sir Charles Bingham, 7th Bt
1776	James Cuffe II	Arthur Browne
1779	James Cuffe II	George Browne
1782	James Cuffe II	Denis Browne
1798	George Jackson	Denis Browne
1801	Succeeded by Westminster constituency of County Mayo	
