= James Cuffe (died 1678) =

Irish politician

Sir James Cuffe (died 1678) was an Irish politician.

== Early life ==
He was the son of Thomas Cuffe of Somerset, he moved to Ireland with his father and brother in 1641.

== Career ==
He served as Member of Parliament for County Mayo in 1661, as Master-General of the Ordnance in Ireland, and was appointed to the Privy Council of Ireland in August 1676.

== Personal life ==
He married Alice, daughter of Ambrose Aungier and his wife Griselda (Grizzell) Bulkeley, granddaughter of Francis Aungier, 1st Baron Aungier and Lancelot Bulkeley, Archbishop of Dublin, and sister of the first and second Earls of Longford. Their children included Francis Cuffe, ancestor of the Pakenham Earls of Longford; Gerald Cuffe, ancestor of Lord Tyrawley; Jane Cuffe, who married Sir Henry Bingham, 3rd Baronet; Alice Cuffe, who married James Macartney, and Lettice Cuffe, who married Francis Folliott.

== Legacy ==
Cuffe Street, Dublin, is named in his honour.
