= Sir Arthur Gore, 2nd Baronet =

Irish politician and baronet (c. 1685–1742)

Sir Arthur Gore, 2nd Baronet (c. 1685 – 10 February 1742) was an Irish politician and baronet.

He was the son of Paul Gore, himself son of Sir Arthur Gore, 1st Baronet, and his wife Anne Gore, daughter of Sir John Gore. Gore succeeded his grandfather as baronet in 1697. He was Member of Parliament (MP) in the Irish House of Commons. Gore represented Ballynakill from 1703 to 1713 and then for Donegal Borough until 1715. Subsequently, he sat for County Mayo until 1741.

Gore was married to Elizabeth Annesley, daughter of Maurice Annesley. They had eight children, four daughters and four sons. Gore was succeeded in the baronetcy by his eldest son Arthur, who later was raised to the Peerage of Ireland as 1st Earl of Arran. Of his daughters, Anne married John Browne, 1st Earl of Altamont and Elizabeth married James Cuffe (died 1762).

Parliament of Ireland
Preceded by Sir Edward Massey; Walter Weldon	Member of Parliament for Ballynakill; 1703–1713; With: John Barrington	Succeeded by John Barrington; Thomas Medlycott
Preceded by Richard Jones; Sir Ralph Gore, 4th Bt	Member of Parliament for Donegal Borough; 1713–1715; With: George Macartney	Succeeded by Henry Maxwell; Robert Miller
Preceded by Henry Bingham; Sir Henry Bingham, 3rd Bt	Member of Parliament for County Mayo; 1715–1742; With: Francis Cuffe 1714–1719; Michael Cuffe 1719–1727; John Bingham 1727–1742	Succeeded by Sir John Bingham, 5th Bt; James Cuffe
Baronetage of Ireland
Preceded by Arthur Gore	Baronet (of Newtown); 1697–1742	Succeeded by Arthur Gore
