= Sir Henry Lynch-Blosse, 7th Baronet =

Sir Henry Lynch-Blosse, 7th Baronet (14 October 1749 – 1788), was an Irish baronet and politician.

== Biography ==
Blosse's Name Act 1748
- Act of Parliament
- Parliament of Great Britain
- Long title: An Act to enable Robert Lynch Esquire to assume and take upon him the Name of Blosse.
- Citation: 22 Geo. 2. c. 38 Pr.
- Territorial extent: Great Britain

Dates
- Royal assent: 26 May 1749
- Commencement: 29 November 1748 (Note: Start of session.)

Status: Current legislation

Lynch-Blosse was born in London, the first child of Robert Lynch and Elizabeth Barker. Elizabeth was the daughter and heir of Francis Barker, and niece and heir of Tobias Blosse. It was a condition of the marriage that Robert would assume the additional surname of Blosse and conform to Protestantism. Robert changed his surname by a private act of Parliament, Blosse's Name Act 1748 (22 Geo. 2. c. 38 Pr.). Henry, better known as Harry, spent the first few years of his life in his mother's home in Suffolk, England.

The family moved to Ireland in 1754 and took up residence at the Lynch-Blosse home in Balla, Co Mayo. When Sir Henry Lynch, 5th Baronet died in 1762, his eldest son, Robert Lynch-Blosse became the 6th Baronet in the succession of Lynch-Blosse Baronets. When Sir Robert died circa 1775, Harry became the 7th Baronet. Shortly afterwards, Sir Harry was elected to the Irish House of Commons representing Tuam. He served in that capacity from 1776 to 1783. Sir Harry was also the godfather of the heiress, Anne O'Donel, who was reputedly abducted by Timothy Brecknock in 1785.

Lynch-Blosse died young in 1788 aged 38 years. He bequeathed generous legacies to each of his seven children by his mistress, Sibella Cottle. Because he died without legitimate heir, the baronetcy passed to his four-year-old nephew, Robert.

== Notes ==
Baronetage of Ireland
Preceded by Robert Lynch-Blosse	Baronet (of Galway); 1775–1788	Succeeded by Robert Lynch-Blosse
