= Bingham baronets =

There have been two baronetcies created for persons with the surname Bingham, one in the Baronetage of Nova Scotia and one in the Baronetage of the United Kingdom.

- Bingham baronets of Castlebar (1634): see Earl of Lucan
- Bingham baronets of West Lea (1903)
