= Henry Bingham (1688–1743) =

Henry Bingham was an Irish politician.

Bingham was educated at Trinity College Dublin. He sat in the Irish House of Commons as a Member of Parliament (MP) in the Irish House of Commons for County Mayo from 1707 to 1714; and for Castlebar from 1715 to 1743.
