= 1870 County Mayo by-election =

UK Parliamentary by-election

The 1870 County Mayo by-election was fought on 12 May 1870. The by-election was fought due to the death of the incumbent Liberal MP George Henry Moore. It was won by the unopposed Liberal candidate George Ekins Browne.
