= Joseph McDonnell =

Joseph McDonnell may refer to:

- Joseph Myles McDonnell (died 1872), Irish Repeal Association politician
- Joseph Patrick McDonnell (1846–1906), Irish-American labor leader and journalist

== See also ==
- Joe McDonnell (disambiguation)
