= George Gore Ousley Higgins =

Member of Parliament for County Mayo
- In office 29 July 1850 – 10 April 1857 Serving with George Henry Moore
- Preceded by: George Henry Moore; Robert Dillon Browne
- Succeeded by: George Henry Moore; Roger Palmer

Personal details
- Born: 15 October 1818
- Died: 8 May 1874 (aged 55)
- Party: Whig
- Other political affiliations: Independent Irish

George Gore Ousley Higgins (15 October 1818 – 8 May 1874) was an Irish Whig and Independent Irish Party politician.

The second son of Fitzgerald Higgins and Mary née Ouseley, Higgins first entered work as a civil servant for the Colony of Jamaica, and was also a Justice of the Peace for County Mayo.

Higgins was elected Whig MP for County Mayo at a by-election in 1850—caused by the death of Robert Dillon Browne—and, becoming an Independent Irish MP in 1852, held the seat until 1857 when he stood again as Whig but was defeated.

Parliament of the United Kingdom
Preceded by George Henry Moore; Robert Dillon Browne	Member of Parliament for County Mayo; 1850–1857; With: George Henry Moore	Succeeded by George Henry Moore; Roger Palmer
