= John Denis Browne =

Irish politician (1798–1862)

John Denis Browne (1798 – 21 May 1862) was an Irish politician.

The fourth son of Denis Browne, John lived at Mount Browne in County Mayo, and was related to the Marquess of Sligo. He stood in the 1831 UK general election in County Mayo, and was elected for the Whigs. He held the seat in the 1832 UK general elections, but was defeated in 1835.

Parliament of the United Kingdom
| Preceded by Dominick Browne; James Browne | Member of Parliament for County Mayo; 1831–1835; With: Dominick Browne | Succeeded by Dominick Browne; William Brabazon |
