= Thomas Tighe =

Thomas Tighe may refer to:

- Thomas Tighe (CEO), American nonprofit chief executive
- Thomas Tighe (MP), Irish politician
- Tommy Tighe, sports radio broadcaster
