= Baron Brabazon =

Baron Brabazon or Lord Brabazon may refer to:

- Baron Brabazon of Tara, a title in the peerage of the UK
- Lord Brabazon, a courtesy title used by some heirs of the Earl of Meath

== See also ==
- Brabazon baronets, a title in the peerage of Ireland
