= Dennis Kelly (disambiguation) =

Dennis Kelly (born 1970) is a British film, television, and theater writer.

Dennis Kelly may also refer to:

- Dennis Kelly (American football) (born 1990), American football offensive tackle
- Dennis Kelly (actor) (1943–2016), American stage and television actor
- Dennis Kelly (judge), Jamaican-born judge, planter and slave owner

== See also ==
- Denis Kelly (1852–1924), Irish Roman Catholic bishop
