= 1874 County Mayo by-election =

UK Parliamentary by-election

- 29 May 1874

Constituency of County Mayo
- Registered: 3,608
- Turnout: 54.4%
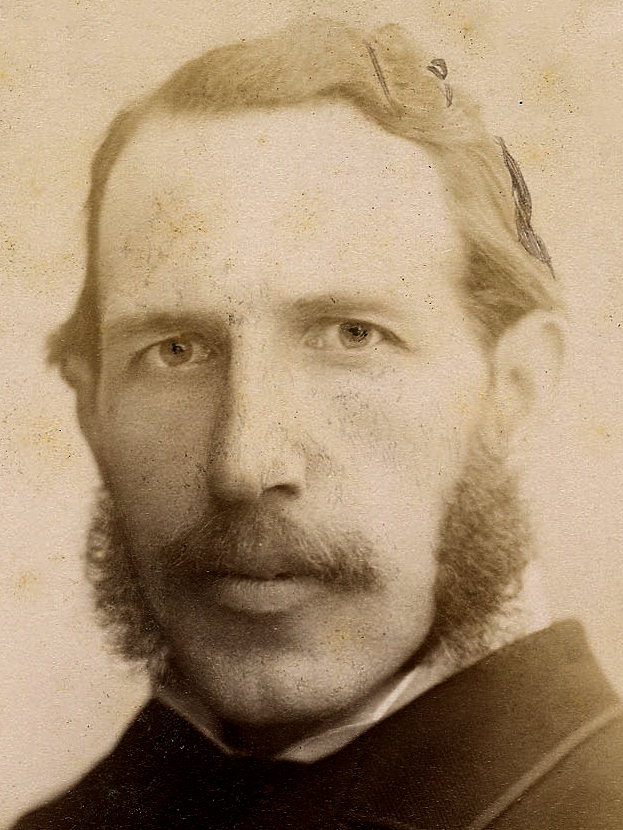
	First party	Second party	Third party
	HRL		HRL
Candidate	George Eakins Browne	John O'Connor Power	Thomas Tighe
Party	Home Rule	Home Rule	Home Rule
Popular vote	1,330	1,319	1,279
Percentage	33.9%	33.6%	32.6%
MPs before election
George Eakins Browne
Thomas Tighe
Home Rule
Elected MPs
George Eakins Browne
John O'Connor Power
Home Rule

The 1874 County Mayo by-election was fought on 29 May 1874. The by-election was fought due to the void elections of the incumbent Home Rule MPs, George Ekins Browne and Thomas Tighe. George Eakins Browne was re-elected while Thomas Tighe was defeated by John O'Connor Power.

== Previous election ==
General election 1874: Mayo
Party	Candidate	Votes	%	±%
Home Rule	George Eakins Browne	Unopposed		
Home Rule	Thomas Tighe	Unopposed		
Registered electors		3,608		
Home Rule gain from Conservative				
Home Rule gain from Liberal				

== By-election ==
By-election, 29 May 1874: Mayo
Party	Candidate	Votes	%	±%
Home Rule	George Eakins Browne	1,330	33.9	N/A
Home Rule	John O'Connor Power	1,319	33.6	N/A
Home Rule	Thomas Tighe	1,279	32.6	N/A
Majority		40	1.0	N/A
Turnout		1,964 (est)	54.4 (est)	N/A
Registered electors		3,608		
Home Rule hold				
Home Rule hold				
