= Howe Browne, 2nd Marquess of Sligo =

Anglo-Irish colonial administrator

The Most Honourable The Marquess of Sligo KP PC PC (Ire)
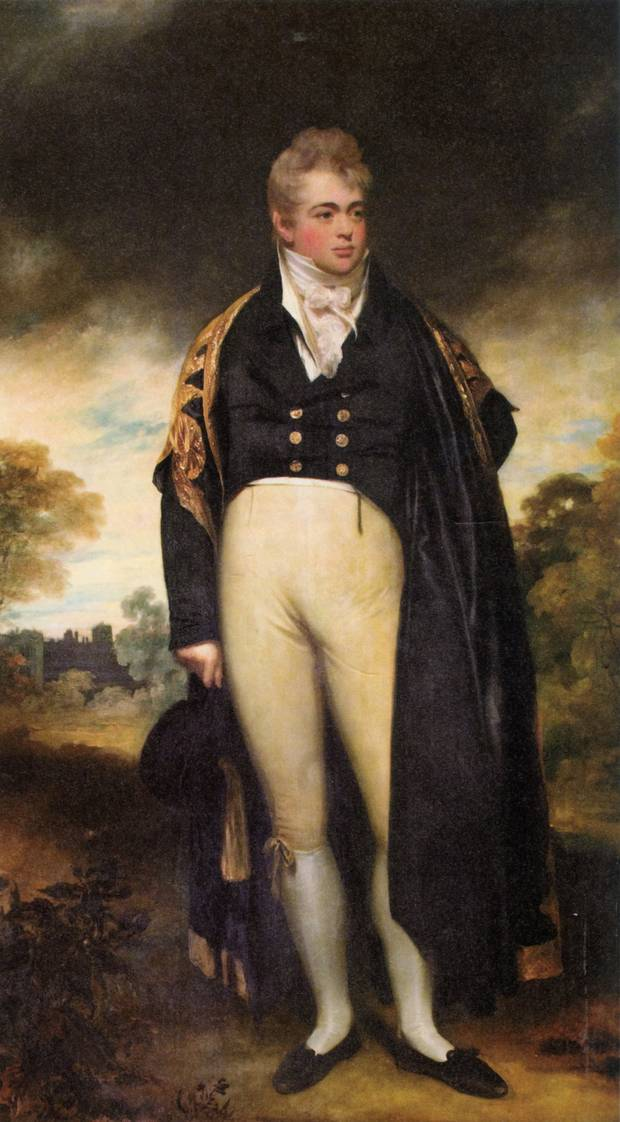
- Portrait of Sligo

Governor of Jamaica
- In office 1834–1836

Lord Lieutenant of Mayo
- In office 1831–1845

Marquess of Sligo
- In office 1809–1845
- Preceded by: John Browne
- Succeeded by: George Browne

Personal details
- Born: 18 May 1788 London, England
- Died: 26 January 1845 (aged 56) Royal Tunbridge Wells, Kent, England
- Resting place: Kensal Green Cemetery, London, England
- Spouse: Hester Catherine de Burgh
- Children: 14, including George
- Parents: John Browne, 1st Marquess of Sligo (father); Lady Louisa Catherine Howe (mother)
- Education: Eton College; Jesus College, Cambridge

Howe Peter Browne, 2nd Marquess of Sligo KP PC PC (Ire) (18 May 1788 – 26 January 1845), styled Viscount Westport until 1800 and Earl of Altamont from 1800 to 1809, was an Anglo-Irish colonial administrator who served as the governor of Jamaica from 1834 to 1836.

== Early life ==
Howe Browne was the son and heir of John Browne, 1st Marquess of Sligo. He was educated at Eton and Jesus College, Cambridge, receiving his MA as Lord Altamont in 1808. During his early years he is reputed to have befriended Thomas De Quincey and Lord Byron. He became Marquess of Sligo in 1809 on the death of his father and was appointed a Knight of the Order of St Patrick on 11 November 1809.

In 1812 Browne was charged with "enticing and persuading (a seaman) to desert (the navy)", a charge punishable with the death sentence at its most extreme. Browne was found guilty and sentenced to a £5,000 fine and four months in Newgate prison. In an odd turn of events, during the course of the trial, his mother grew amorous for the Judge Sir William Scott. Following the trial, the two were introduced and later married, despite a 20-year age gap. However, the marriage did not prove to be a happy one and was apparently on the rocks after just one year.

== Marriage and family ==
Previous to his marriage, he had a relationship with the French courtesan Pauline 'Cherie' Pacquot. The affair produced one son, William Henry Browne (1813-1817), whose paternity Howe questioned upon discovering he was not Pauline's only lover. He paid £1,000 a year to support Pacquot and his son.

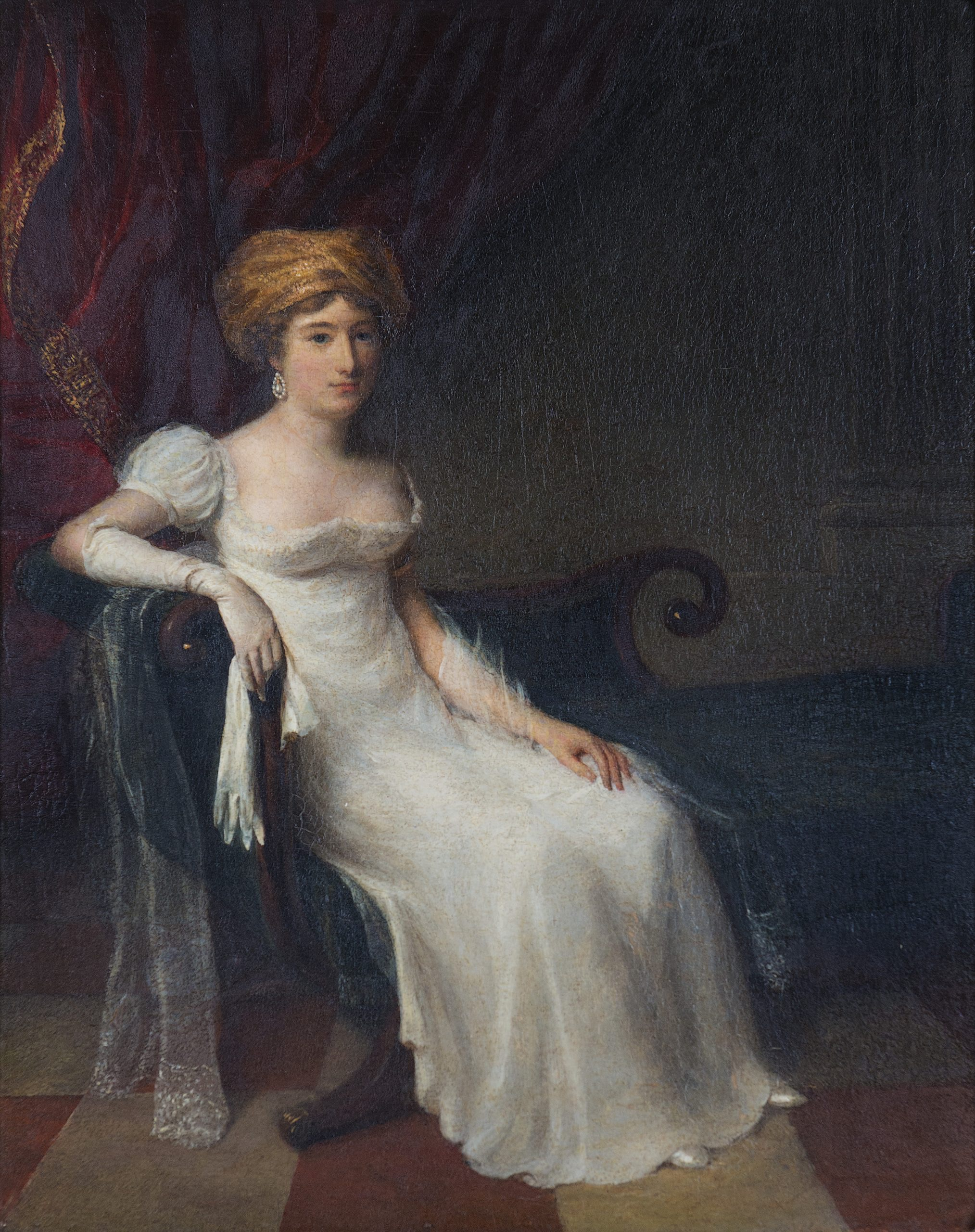
Hester Catherine de Burgh, 2nd Marchioness of Sligo (1800-1878)

On 4 March 1816, Browne married the 16-year-old Hester Catherine, daughter of John de Burgh, 13th Earl of Clanricarde. His mother is said to have remarked that "the most remarkable likeness to Pauline that I ever saw". The couple had 14 children between 1817 and 1839. Lady Hester was a cultured woman who patronised the arts and renovated Westport House, the family seat in County Mayo, and its gardens. The family also had a London home at 16 Mansfield Street, Marylebone. With her husband, she campaigned to abolish slavery, and later to relieve the Irish famine. She was a patron of the Sisters of Mercy. Their first child, Louisa Catherine was born at Westport House in December 1816. Their second daughter Elizabeth was born in December 1818. In January 1820 his oldest son George was born and named in honour of his godfather, King George IV. A second son Howe who was born in January 1821 died in Florence in February 1822. A third daughter Catherine was born in April 1822. James de Burgh (‘Jem’) was born in 1823. John was born in Westport House in 1824. Harriet was born in Paris in 1827. Emily Charlotte was born in Westport House in 1829. A son Henry Ulick was born in March 1831. A son Richard was born in Jamaica in August 1834. Hester Georgina was born in July 1837 and Augusta in August 1838. Their last child Marianne was born in 1839.

== Governor of Jamaica ==
In 1834-35 he was appointed Governor and Vice-Admiral of Jamaica and received with much pomp and circumstance. The local plantation owners assumed that Browne, as a plantation owner himself, would look after their interests. However Browne's ownership of two plantations on the island had come to him via an inheritance upon the death of his grandmother, and as Browne would reveal in short order, did not think much of the institution of slavery being practised on the island.

Arriving shortly after the Slavery Abolition Act 1833, Browne attempted to oversee the transition from slavery into a free society. After the passage of the Slave Compensation Act 1837 he had received over £5,000 for the loss of 286 enslaved persons on his Jamaican estates. He reformed the legal system, appointing the mixed-race Richard Hill in charge of the stipendiary magistrates during "the Apprenticeship" (a four-year period in which the black population was to be "taught" how to be "proper citizens"). He also set up schools for the black population, two of which he personally financed.

These moves almost instantly made Browne a villain to the ruling class in Jamaica. They quickly mocked his past reputation in the local press; "We are fully aware of his Lordship's nautical excursions and frolics before he came to Jamaica". By 1836 the Jamaican Assembly were blocking his attempts to fully emancipate the Black Jamaican population and were able to force him to resign from the Governorship. The first free village of Sligoville in Saint Catherine parish, Jamaica is named after him.

Lord and Lady Sligo are buried in Kensal Green Cemetery. Their grave lies in the centre of the overgrown northwest quadrant of the inner circle.

== Arms ==
Coat of arms of Howe Browne, 2nd Marquess of Sligo
Crest An eagle, displayed, vert. Escutcheon Sable, three lions, passant, in bend, argent, between four bendlets, of the last. Supporters Dexter, a talbot, proper, gorged with a baron’s coronet; Sinister, a horse, argent Motto Suivez raison (Follow reason). Orders The Most Illustrious Order of St. Patrick - Knight (KP).

Government offices
Preceded by George Cuthbert	Governor of Jamaica; 1834–1836	Succeeded by Sir Lionel Smith
Honorary titles
New office	Lord Lieutenant of Mayo; 1831–1845	Succeeded by The Earl of Lucan
Peerage of Ireland
Preceded by John Browne	Marquess of Sligo; 1809–1845	Succeeded by George Browne
