= Lord Lieutenant of Mayo =

Ceremonial officer in Mayo, Ireland

This is a list of people who have served as Lord-Lieutenant of Mayo.

There were lieutenants of counties in Ireland until the reign of James II, when they were renamed governors. The office of Lord Lieutenant was recreated on 23 August 1831.

== Governors ==
- James O'Hara, 2nd Baron Tyrawley: –1774
- John Browne, 1st Earl of Altamont: 1774–1776
- Charles Bingham, 1st Earl of Lucan: 1776–
- John Browne, 1st Baron Kilmaine: –1794
- John Browne, 1st Marquess of Sligo 1779–1808
- Arthur Gore, 2nd Earl of Arran: 1794–1809
- James Cuffe, 1st Baron Tyrawley: 1778?–1821
- Charles Dillon, 12th Viscount Dillon: 1809–1813
- James Cuffe: 1818–1828
- James Caulfeild Browne, 2nd Baron Kilmaine: 1821–1825
- Dominick Geoffrey Browne: –1831
- Howe Browne, 2nd Marquess of Sligo: –1831

== Lord Lieutenants ==
- Howe Browne, 2nd Marquess of Sligo: 7 October 1831 – 26 January 1845
- Field Marshal George Bingham, 3rd Earl of Lucan: 25 February 1845 – 10 November 1888
- Arthur Gore, 5th Earl of Arran: 14 January 1889 – 14 March 1901
- Charles Bingham, 4th Earl of Lucan: 27 July 1901 – 5 June 1914
- George Browne, 6th Marquess of Sligo: 1 September 1914 – 1922
