= Charles Bingham =

Charles Bingham may refer to:

- Charles Bingham, 1st Earl of Lucan (1735–1799), Irish MP for Mayo, British MP for Northampton
- Charles George Bingham, 4th Earl of Lucan (1830–1914), British MP for Mayo and Lord Lieutenant of Mayo
- Charles Thomas Bingham (1848–1908), Irish military officer and entomologist

== See also ==
- Charlie Bingham, Modern Family character
