= James Browne (1793–1854) =

Irish politician

James Browne (15 June 1793 – 23 December 1854) was an Irish politician who was the son of Hon. Denis Browne, MP for County Mayo in 1801 and brother of Peter Browne, MP. He succeeded his father in the year 1828 and was elected in 1818 as Member of Parliament for County Mayo, and held the seat until 1831.

James Browne married twice. His first wife being Eleanor Catherine, the daughter of John Wells of Bickley, Kent and his second wife being Elizabeth, the daughter of John David Puget, a banker of Totteridge, Hertfordshire. Browne had a son and three daughters by Elizabeth.

Parliament of the United Kingdom
Preceded by Denis Browne; Dominick Browne	Member of Parliament for County Mayo; 1818 – 1831; With: Dominick Browne 1818–26; George Bingham, Baron Bingham 1826–30; Dominick Browne 1830–31	Succeeded by Dominick Browne; John Denis Browne
