= Robert Dillon Browne =

Irish politician

Member of Parliament for County Mayo
- In office 6 May 1836 – 1 July 1850 Serving with William Brabazon (1836–1840); Mark Blake (1840–1846); Joseph Myles McDonnell (1846–1847); George Henry Moore (1847–1850)
- Preceded by: William Brabazon; Dominick Browne
- Succeeded by: George Henry Moore; George Gore Ousley Higgins

Personal details
- Born: 1811
- Died: 1 July 1850 (aged 38–39)
- Party: Repeal Association

Robert Dillon Browne (1811 – 1 July 1850) was an Irish Repeal Association politician.

Browne was born in County Mayo and educated at Trinity College Dublin. Browne was elected Repeal Association MP for County Mayo at a by-election in 1836—caused by the elevation of Dominick Browne to a Peerage—and held the seat until his death in 1850.

Parliament of the United Kingdom
Preceded by William Brabazon; Dominick Browne	Member of Parliament for County Mayo; 1836–1850; With: William Brabazon (1836–1840); Mark Blake (1840–1846); Joseph Myles McDonnell (1846–1847); George Henry Moore (1847–1850)	Succeeded by George Henry Moore; George Gore Ousley Higgins
