= George Henry Moore (politician) =

Irish politician (1810–1870)

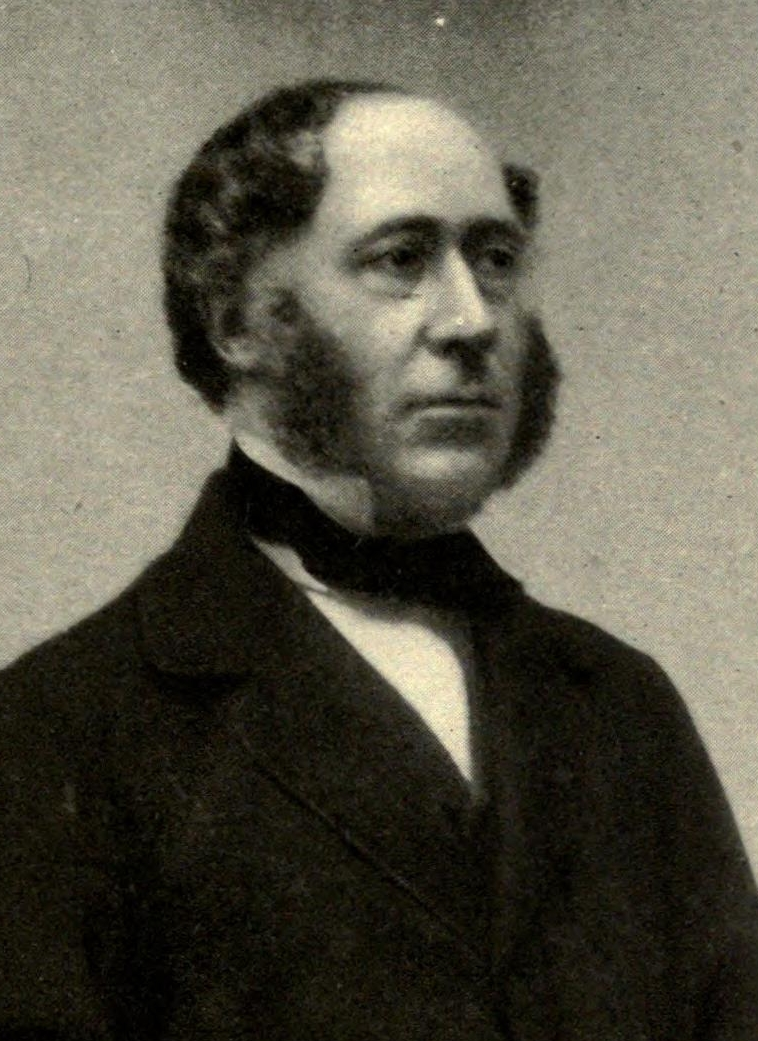
- Born: 1 March 1810; County Mayo, Ireland
- Died: 19 April 1870 (aged 60); Moore Hall, County Mayo, Ireland
- Resting place: Kiltoom, Moore Hall, County Mayo.
- Known for: Politician, landowner, tenant-right activist
- Office: Member of Parliament for County Mayo, 1847-1857, 1868-1870
- Movement: Catholic Defence Association, Tenant Right League
- Children: George Augustus; Maurice George; Nina; Henry Julian; Augustus
- Parent(s): George Moore and Louisa Browne
- Relatives: John Moore (uncle)

George Henry Moore (1 March 1810 – 19 April 1870) was an Irish politician who, in the 1850s, was a co-founder of the Tenant Right League, of the Catholic Defence Association and, as the Member for Mayo in the United Kingdom Parliament, of the Independent Irish Party. Although an advocate of tenant rights, and renowned for his relief efforts during the Great Famine, at the time of his death in 1870 Moore was defending his rights as a landowner against an oath-bound tenant society, the Ribbonmen. He was the father of the novelist George Augustus Moore and of the Fianna Fáil Senator Maurice George Moore.

== Family ==
George Henry Moore was born 1 March 1810 in Moore Hall, Ballyglass, County Mayo, the eldest of three sons born to Louisa Moore (née Browne), granddaughter of John Browne, 1st Earl of Altamont and George Moore (1770–1840), landowner and historian, the son of a wealthy merchant. In the rebellion year of 1798, an uncle, John Moore, was named President of the Government of the province of Connaught in Castlebar by General Humbert during its brief occupation by the French.

The Moores were originally English Protestant gentry but became Catholic when John Moore married a Roman Catholic, Jane Lynch Athy of Galway, and when their son, George, married Katherine de Kilikelly (a.k.a. Kelly), an Irish-Spanish Catholic, in 1765.

== Horse racing gentry ==
Moore was educated in England at St Mary's Catholic preparatory school in Oscott, near Birmingham, before entering Christ's College, Cambridge in 1827. Unable as a Catholic to take a degree, he spent most of his time gambling and playing billiards. Sent to London in 1830 to study law, he soon fell heavily into debt from gambling and so was recalled again to attend to the family estate of 12,000 acres.

From 1834 he traveled abroad, visiting Russia, Syria, and Palestine. On his father's death in 1840 he was recalled again to Mayo where he established a successful racing stable. After his brother Augustus was killed riding at Aintree in the 1845 English Grand National, and before selling his horses, Moore made one last grand wager. He won £10,000 on his own horse in the 1846 Chester Cup. The winnings he was to deploy, in part, for Irish famine relief.

== Organiser of Famine relief ==
During the Great Famine (1845–1852) Mayo was one of the counties worst ravaged by starvation and illness, but none of Moore's tenants starved, nor were any evicted—a fact he was to uphold twice in libel cases against The Times regarding the treatment of tenants and his character. Moore reduced rents: a full remission for any tenant paying £5 per year and 75% remission for those paying under £10 per annum. Although scolded by Marquess of Sligo for not evicting his tenants en masse, with the Marquess and another neighbouring landowner, Sir Robert Lynch-Blosse, Moore imported 1,000 tonnes of flour from the United States for distribution among tenants at half cost. As the famine got worse Moore gave grazing lands to the people and placed others directly under his care on his own estate at Moore Hall. His estate gradually fell into debt, forcing him during 1854 to sell half his property for £5,900.

== Catholic Defence, and Tenant Right, MP ==
Moore ran successfully in Mayo against Irish Repeal candidates in the 1847 general election. On a narrow property franchise he won his seat in Parliament with 504 votes. He tried, and failed, at a Dublin convention to get his fellow Whigs to oppose their leadership at Westminster, the government of Lord John Russell, and protest the laissez-faire approach to the agrarian crisis maintained by Treasury secretary Charles Trevelyan.

In 1851, Moore became chief parliamentary spokesman for the Irish Catholic opposition to the Ecclesiastical Titles Act, an attempt to hamper the restoration in the United Kingdom of the Roman Catholic episcopate. A close friend of Archbishop John MacHale of Tuam, Moore took the leading role in establishing (August 1851) the Catholic Defence Association (CDA). On 28 October 1852, with the support of twenty-six MPs, Moore also established in Dublin the short-lived Friends of Religious Freedom and Equality to call for the disestablishment of the Church of Ireland.

At the same time, Moore cooperated with the Young Irelander Charles Gavan Duffy, editor of The Nation, in uniting southern, overwhelmingly Catholic, tenant protection societies with northern, largely Presbyterian, tenant-right associations in an all-Ireland Tenant Right League. In the 1852 general election, Moore was one of 48 MPs returned with the League's endorsement. At his insistence, and by prior agreement, they sat as the Independent Irish Party, pledged to support no government that did not both advance tenant rights and revoke the Ecclesiastical Titles Act. Combined with the presence among of many sitting Repeal MPs, the joining of the two platforms assisted the Irish Conservatives and their Orange Order auxiliaries in painting disloyalty to landlords as disloyalty to the Protestant Crown and to the Union. Only one tenant-right MP was returned from Ulster: William Kirk in Newry.

Within six months two of Moore's colleagues William Keogh and John Sadleir broke ranks. Finding that, with a number of other CDA members, they held the balance of power in the House of Commons, they voted for, and accepted offices in, a new Whig-Peelite ministry in return for a commitment on the church question alone. With Duffy and Frederick Lucas, editor of the liberal Catholic journal The Tablet, Moore helped rouse popular indignation, but was opposed by the Roman Catholic Primate, Archbishop Paul Cullen. Moore continued to put pressure on MPs to adopt the independent opposition policy by using the influence of the Tenant League, of which he was chairman during 1856. During the late 1850s he also made repeated unsuccessful attempts to persuade the Young Ireland veteran William Smith O'Brien to re-enter Irish politics and lead the independent party.

In Archbishop Hale and in the local clergy Moore had sufficient clerical support for it to be made an issue in his re-election to Parliament in 1857. Invoking the new Corrupt Practices Act (1854), his Ascendancy opponents persuaded the House of Commons "that Mr. Moore's election had been carried mainly, if not entirely, by the influence of the Roman Catholic priesthood—not the influence of advice, or suggestion, or even of persuasion, but the influence of spiritual intimidation in its most marked and obtrusive form", including "a most unseemly electioneering mandate, signed by "John Archbishop of Tuam," and three Roman Catholic Bishops". He was denied his seat, and replaced in bye-election, unopposed, by Lord John Browne. (Moore was one of nine Irish MPs to be unseated on ground of undue clerical influence between 1853 and 1892).

Moore refused to back Cullen's preferred alternative to the independent opposition, the National Association of Ireland (established 29 December 1864). Instead, with the encouragement of Archbishop MacHale, in 1868 Moore stood again for parliament in Mayo as a Liberal on a platform of tenant right and amnesty for Fenian prisoners. Although he had himself, according to John Devoy, been denied entry into the Irish Republican Brotherhood by James Stephens in 1864, he began conferring regularly with some IRB leaders. In common with John O'Connor Power and other more moderate republicans, Moore apparently desired some form of alliance between the Fenians and tenant-right MPs, with a view to forming a new political movement.

== Targeted landlord ==
Moore died on 19 April 1870, at Moore Hall. He had left his family in London just four days before. In a later biography, his son Maurice revealed that what had brought his father home was not, as reported in the papers at the time, the need to consult local leaders before he introduced a Home Rule bill. Rather, it was the attention Moore and his tenants were receiving from local Ribbonmen.

A few months before his journey back to Ireland, Moore had been forwarded a copy of a note red ink that was being circulated to tenants on the outlying Ballintubber estate of his 12,481 acre property: "IMPORTANT. Notice is hereby given that any person who pays rents to landlords, agents, or bailiffs above that of ordnance valuation will at his peril mark the consequences. By order, Rory ".

Moore was incensed that his public commitment to agrarian reform should count for so little. Shortly before leaving London, in a debate on the second reading of Gladstone's Landlord and Tenant (Ireland) Act, Moore had protested that its concessions to the Three Fs (Fair rent, Fixity of tenure, and Free sale) did not go far enough to check the power of landlords to drive out tenants (old and sick) through remorseless rent increases. In Mayo, during and after the famine, many landlords had made a complete clearance of their tenants and turned their holdings into grazing farms.

Moore concluded the Ballintubber Ribbonmen were simply out to blackmail him. He wrote to the local priest, a fellow protégé of MacHale's, Father Patrick Lavelle declaring that just because as an MP he advocated the rights of tenants did not mean he was going to surrender his rights as a landlord. Those who count upon taking base advantage of his political position "will find that they have mistaken their man". He would not be intimidated and he would evict every tenant who did not pay rent. It would be an act of charity to the poor, Moore wrote, if Father Lavelle would intervene.

== Death ==
As soon as the Easter parliamentary recess began, Moore made his last return to Ireland, arriving on Good Friday, 1870. On Sunday, he attended Easter Mass at the local church in Carnacon. But on Monday, ill, he retired to his bed. He died the following afternoon of a stroke. Father Lavelle administered last rites.

In 1851 Moore had married Mary, daughter of Maurice Blake, a landlord with property in counties Mayo and Galway. They had five children. These included the future writer George Augustus Moore and the future Fianna Fáil Senator, Maurice George Moore. Maurice's support for the Irish Free State prompted the anti-Treaty IRA to burn down the family's ancestral home, Moore Hall during the Irish Civil War in 1923.

Parliament of the United Kingdom
Preceded by Robert Dillon Browne; Joseph Myles McDonnell	Member of Parliament for County Mayo; 1847 – 1857; With: Robert Dillon Browne 1847–1850; George Gore Ousley Higgins 1850–1857; Roger Palmer 1857	Succeeded by Lord John Browne; Roger Palmer
Preceded by Lord John Browne; Roger Palmer	Member of Parliament for Mayo; 1868–1870; With: Charles Bingham, Lord Bingham	Succeeded by George Ekins Browne; Charles Bingham, Lord Bingham
