= George Jackson (Irish politician) =

Irish politician

George Jackson (1761–1805) was an Irish politician.

His was the eldest son of George Jackson and his wife Jane Cuffe, daughter of James Cuffe and Elizabeth Gore, and sister of James Cuffe, 1st Baron Tyrawley and entered Trinity College Dublin in 1777.

He succeeded his uncle Lord Tyrawley in representing County Mayo in the Irish House of Commons from 1798 to the Act of Union in 1801. He supported the Union, but received relatively little by way of reward. He was subsequently a Member of Parliament for County Mayo in the first Parliament of the United Kingdom until 1802. His application to be made a baronet was unsuccessful., but despite this disappointment, he was generally seen as a reliable supporter of the Government in the Commons.

He married Maria, the daughter and heiress of William Rutledge of Foxford, County Mayo, and had 6 sons and 7 daughters. His son James, born in 1790, became a Lieutenant-General in the British Army. His daughter Jane married Major Christopher L'Estrange Carleton of Market Hill, County Fermanagh. His son William (1787–1822) married Louise Jean Blair, daughter of William Blair of Blair.

Parliament of Ireland
Preceded by James Cuffe; Denis Browne	Member of Parliament for County Mayo; 1798 – 1801; With: Denis Browne	Succeeded by Parliament of the United Kingdom
Parliament of the United Kingdom
New constituency	Member of Parliament for County Mayo; 1801 – 1802; With: Denis Browne	Succeeded by Henry Dillon; Denis Browne
