= George Bingham, 3rd Earl of Lucan =

British Army officer

Field Marshal The Right Honourable The Earl of Lucan GCB
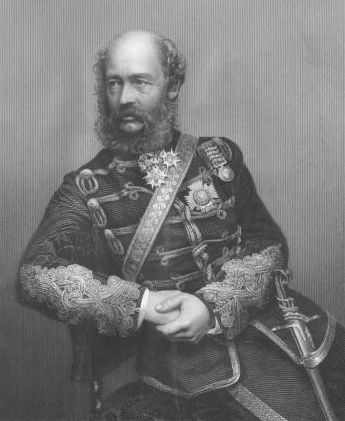
- The 3rd Earl of Lucan. Engraving by D. J. Pound, c. 1860
- Born: 16 April 1800; London, England, Great Britain
- Died: 10 November 1888 (aged 88); London, England, United Kingdom
- Spouse: Lady Anne Brudenell (m. 1829; died 1877)
- Military career
- Allegiance: United Kingdom
- Branch: British Army
- Service years: 1816–1877
- Rank: Field Marshal
- Nicknames: "The Exterminator", "Lord Look-on"
- Commands: Cavalry Division
- Conflicts: Crimean War
- Awards: Knight Grand Cross of the Order of the Bath; Order of St. Anna, 2nd Class (Russia); Order of the Medjidie, First Class (Ottoman Empire); Commander of the Legion of Honour (France)

George Charles Bingham, 3rd Earl of Lucan, GCB (16 April 1800 – 10 November 1888), styled Lord Bingham before 1839, was an Anglo-Irish peer and military officer. He was one of three men, along with Louis Nolan and Lord Raglan, responsible for the fateful order during the Battle of Balaclava in October 1854 that led to the Light Brigade commander, the Earl of Cardigan, leading the Charge of the Light Brigade. He was subsequently promoted to field marshal. He was a ruthless landlord during the Great Famine in Ireland, evicting thousands of his tenants and renting his land to wealthy ranchers. He also came up with a solution that allowed Jews to sit in Parliament.

== Life and military career ==
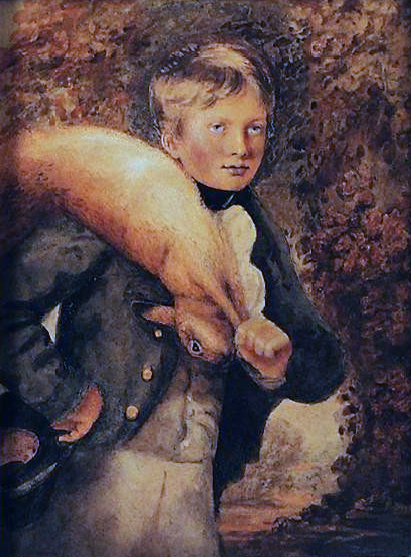
George, Lord Bingham, at age 14, painted by his sister Elizabeth Harcourt

Born the first son of Richard Bingham, 2nd Earl of Lucan, an Anglo-Irish peer, and Elizabeth Bingham (née Belasyse), Lord Bingham (as he was styled up until late June 1839) attended Westminster School but left formal education to be commissioned as an ensign in the 6th Regiment of Foot on 29 August 1816. He transferred to the 11th Light Dragoons on 24 December 1818.

Lord Bingham became a lieutenant in the 8th Regiment of Foot on 20 January 1820, a captain in the 74th Regiment of Foot on 16 May 1822 and was promoted to major, unattached, on 23 June 1825. He transferred to the 17th Lancers on 1 December 1825 and became commanding officer of the regiment with the rank of lieutenant colonel on 9 November 1826; he lavished such expense on his officers' uniforms and horses that the officers became known as "Bingham's Dandies". He was also elected as MP for County Mayo in 1826 and held that seat until 1830. During the Russo-Turkish War, which began in 1828, he acted as an observer with the Imperial Russian Army.

=== 'The Exterminator' ===
Lord Bingham succeeded his father as 3rd Earl of Lucan in the Peerage of Ireland on 30 June 1839 and, having become an Irish Representative Peer in June 1840 and having been promoted to colonel on 23 November 1841, he became Lord Lieutenant of Mayo in 1845. During the Great Famine in the late 1840s, he was ruthless and introduced mass evictions from villages such as Ballinrobe. Famously stating that he "would not breed paupers to pay priests," he demolished over 300 homes and evicted 2,000 people in Ballinrobe alone between 1846 and 1849. He even insisted on closing the workhouse in Castlebar at the height of the Famine. For this, Lord Bingham earned the hatred of many Irishmen and became known as "The Exterminator". He was promoted to major general on 11 November 1851.

=== Crimean War ===
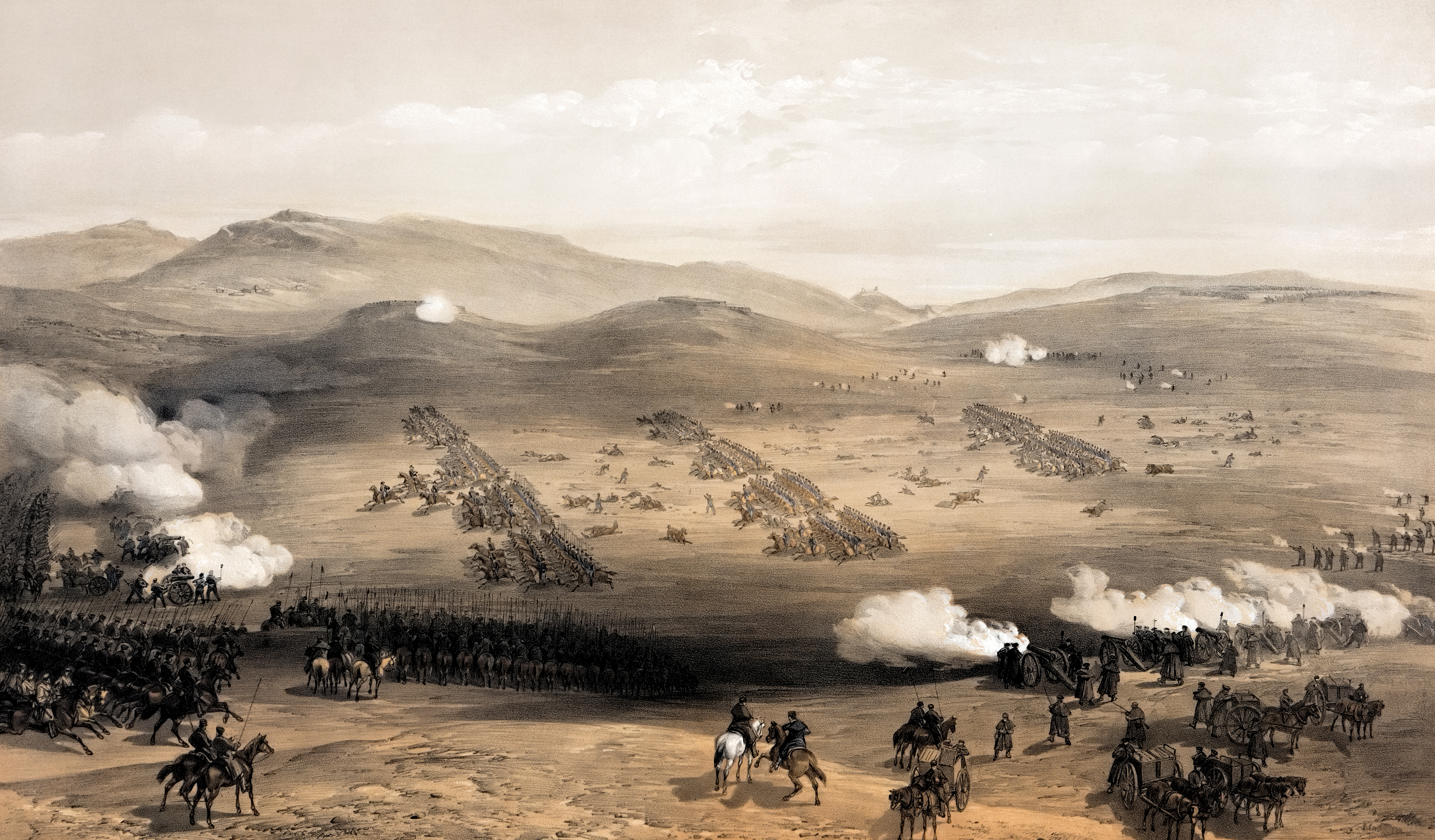
The Charge of the Light Brigade: it was Lucan who gave the order to Cardigan to lead the charge.

At the outbreak of the Crimean War, Lord Lucan applied for a post and was made commander of the Cavalry Division. His brother-in-law, the 7th Earl of Cardigan, was one of his subordinates, commanding the Light Brigade – an unfortunate choice as the two men heartily detested each other. Promoted to brevet lieutenant general on 18 August 1854, he was present at the Battle of Alma in September 1854 but, on the orders of the army commander, Lord Raglan, he held his division in reserve. This incident earned Lucan the undeserved, but persistent, nickname of "Lord Look-on".

At the Battle of Balaclava in October 1854, Lucan received an order from Raglan that the cavalry were to advance. Raglan's order stated that infantry would be in support, but none had arrived so Lucan did not comply. It was not until Raglan saw that Russian troops were about to capture some artillery pieces that he issued a further order, now requiring an "immediate" cavalry advance. At this point, Lucan ordered Cardigan to lead the Light Brigade forward, and the Charge of the Light Brigade commenced. Lucan in turn led the Heavy Brigade forward in support, at a more restrained pace. Both brigades came under heavy fire, and Lucan was slightly wounded. While the Light Brigade continued the charge as far as the enemy guns, receiving very heavy casualties and with no significant gain, Lucan ordered the Heavy Brigade to retire. Raglan blamed Lucan for the loss ("You have lost the light brigade"), and censured him in despatches. Although Lucan complained against this censure, as the relationship between the army commander and the cavalry commander had clearly broken down, he was recalled to England, where he returned at the beginning of March 1855.

Oriental Army of the Crimean campaign by Gustav Bartsch. From left to right: Admiral Ferdinand-Alphonse Hamelin, Lord Lucan, Lord Raglan, Admiral Dundas, Sir John Campbell, Duke of Cambridge, Lord Cardigan, Ismail Pasha, Omer Pasha, Muhlis Pasha (Grigore Sturdza), Sultan Abdülmecid I, Said-Bey (Vasile Obedeanu), Ahmed Pasha, col. Desmaret, Marshal Baraguey d'Hilliers, Prince Napoleon, col. Trochu, Marshal de Saint-Arnaud, general Bosquet, general de Canrobert

On his arrival, Lucan's demand for a court-martial was declined and instead he defended himself with a speech to the House of Lords on 19 March 1855, blaming Raglan and his deceased aide-de-camp, Captain Louis Nolan. This tactic appears to have been successful as he was subsequently appointed Knight Commander of the Order of the Bath on 5 July 1855, and colonel of the 8th Light Dragoons, who had charged with the Light Brigade, on 17 November 1855.

== Later life ==
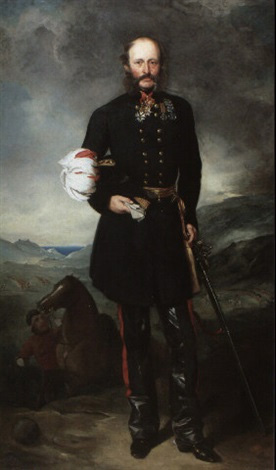
Portrait by Francis Grant, c.1856

A significant contribution was made by Lucan to Parliament when he produced a solution to the problem of admitting Jews to Parliament. Prior to this, distinguished Jews had declined to take the oath "on the true faith of a Christian" and having not been sworn in as required by statute, were refused voting rights although having been elected an MP. Lucan proposed, by way of a compromise, that each House could decide and modify its own oath. The House of Lords, who had long opposed the admission of Jews, agreed to this. A prominent Jew, Lionel Nathan Rothschild, was thus allowed to enter the House of Commons and was sworn in on 26 July 1858.

Although Lucan never again saw active duty, he was promoted to lieutenant general on 24 December 1858, and, having become colonel of the 1st Regiment of Life Guards on 27 February 1865, he was to promoted to general on 28 August 1865 and advanced to Knight Grand Cross of the Order of the Bath in 1869. He formally retired in October 1877, but after some lobbying he was promoted to field marshal on 21 June 1887. He died at 13 South Street, Park Lane, London, on 10 November 1888 and was buried at Laleham in Middlesex.

== Family ==
In 1829, Bingham married Lady Anne Brudenell, seventh daughter of Robert Brudenell, 6th Earl of Cardigan; they had six children, two daughters being still born or dying soon after birth:

- Charles George, 4th Earl of Lucan. He was married to Cecilia Catherine Gordon-Lennox the daughter of Charles Gordon-Lennox, 5th Duke of Richmond. They had issue. His descendants included Diana, Princess of Wales.
- Augusta (7 February 1832 – 3 July 1888), married her cousin Henry Sturt, 1st Baron Alington on 10 September 1853, and had issue.
- Lavinia (circa 1836 – 15 September 1864), married Charles Hardinge, 2nd Viscount Hardinge MP for Downpatrick on 10 April 1856, and had issue.
- Rear-Admiral Richard (6 January 1847 – 12 November 1924), married Mary Elizabeth Cole, the paternal great-granddaughter of Edward Smith-Stanley, 12th Earl of Derby and the maternal granddaughter of Henry Brooke Parnell, 1st Baron Congleton.

== Sources ==
- Calthorpe, Somerset John Gough (1857). Letters from Headquarters: Or, The Realities of the War in the Crimea, by an Officer on the Staff. London: John Murray.
- Heathcote, Tony (1999). The British Field Marshals 1736–1997. Leo Cooper. ISBN 0-85052-696-5.

Parliament of the United Kingdom
Preceded by Dominick Browne; James Browne	Member of Parliament for County Mayo; 1826–1830; With: James Browne	Succeeded by James Browne; Dominick Browne
Military offices
Preceded by Sir John Brown	Colonel of the 8th (The King's Royal Irish) Hussars; 1855–1865	Succeeded by John Lawrenson
Preceded by The Viscount Combermere	Colonel of the 1st Regiment of Life Guards; 1865–1888	Succeeded by Prince Edward of Saxe-Weimar
Honorary titles
Preceded by The Marquess of Sligo	Lord Lieutenant of Mayo; 1845–1888	Succeeded by The Earl of Arran
Peerage of Ireland
Preceded by Richard Bingham	Earl of Lucan; 1839–1888	Succeeded by Charles Bingham
Political offices
Preceded by The Earl of Enniskillen	Representative peer for Ireland; 1840–1888	Succeeded by The Lord Clarina
