= Mark Blake (politician) =

British politician

Mark Lynch Blake (died 27 June 1886) was an Irish politician.

Lynch was educated at Trinity College Dublin. He was elected in 1840 as a Member of Parliament for County Mayo, and held the seat until 1846.

Parliament of the United Kingdom
Preceded by Sir William Brabazon; Robert Dillon Browne	Member of Parliament for County Mayo; 1840 – 1846; With: Robert Dillon Browne	Succeeded by Joseph McDonnell; Robert Dillon Browne
