= Dominick Browne, 1st Baron Oranmore and Browne =

Irish politician (1787–1860)

Dominick Browne, 1st Baron Oranmore and Browne PC (28 May 1787 – 30 January 1860), was an Irish politician.

Browne was the son of Dominick Geoffrey Browne and his wife Margaret. She was the daughter of the Hon. George Browne, 4th son of John, 1st Earl of Altamont.

He sat as Member of Parliament for County Mayo from 1814 to 1826 and from 1830 to 1836 and was admitted to the Irish Privy Council in 1834. In 1836 he was raised to the Peerage of Ireland as Baron Oranmore and Browne, of Carrabrowne Castle in the County of the Town of Galway and of Castle Macgarret in the County of Mayo.

Lord Oranmore and Browne married Catherine Anne Isabella, daughter of Henry Monck, in 1811. He died in January 1860, aged 72, and was succeeded in the barony by his son Geoffrey. Lady Oranmore and Browne died in 1865.

== Notes ==
Parliament of the United Kingdom
Preceded by Denis Browne; Henry Dillon	Member of Parliament for County Mayo; 1814–1826; With: Denis Browne 1814–1818; James Browne 1814–1826	Succeeded by James Browne; Lord Bingham
Preceded by James Browne; Lord Bingham	Member of Parliament for County Mayo; 1830–1836; With: James Browne 1830–1831; John Denis Browne 1831–1835; Sir William Brabazon 1835–1836	Succeeded by Sir William Brabazon; Robert Dillon Browne
Peerage of Ireland
New creation	Baron Oranmore and Browne; 1836–1860	Succeeded by Geoffrey Browne-Guthrie
