= John Browne, 1st Marquess of Sligo =

Anglo-Irish politician

The Most Honourable The Marquess of Sligo KP PC (Ire)
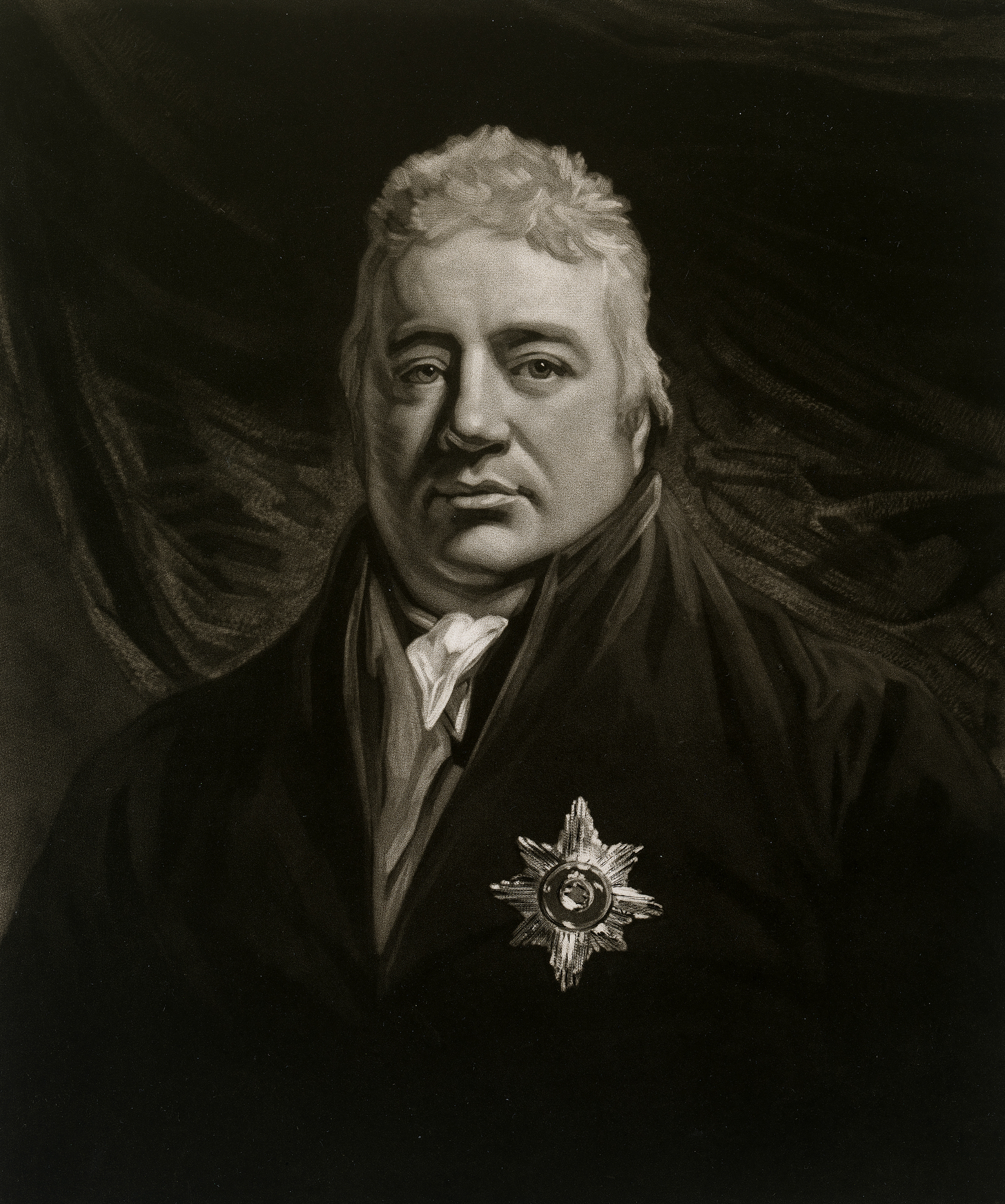
- Engraving by William Whiston Barney after a John Opie portrait, 1806

Representative peer for Ireland
- In office 1800–1809

Member of the Parliament of Ireland
- In office 1776–1780

John Denis Browne, 1st Marquess of Sligo, KP, PC (Ire) (11 June 1756 – 2 January 1809) was an Anglo-Irish politician who was the son of Peter Browne, 2nd Earl of Altamont, and his wife Elizabeth, née Kelly, heiress and daughter of Denis Kelly, Chief Justice of Jamaica. Peter's marriage to Elizabeth led to the family inheriting the Kelly's slave plantations in Jamaica.

Browne was styled Viscount Westport from 1771 to 1780 and known as John Browne, 3rd Earl of Altamont from 1780 to 1800. Browne represented Jamestown in the Irish House of Commons from 1776 to 1780, when he succeeded as Earl of Altamont. He served as High Sheriff of Mayo for 1779. He became Marquess of Sligo on 29 December 1800 and was appointed a Knight of the Order of St Patrick on 5 August 1800. Following the implementation of the Acts of Union 1800 he was elected as one of the original 28 Irish representative peers and took his seat in the House of Lords. He died on 2 June 1809 in Lisbon, Portugal.

== Family ==
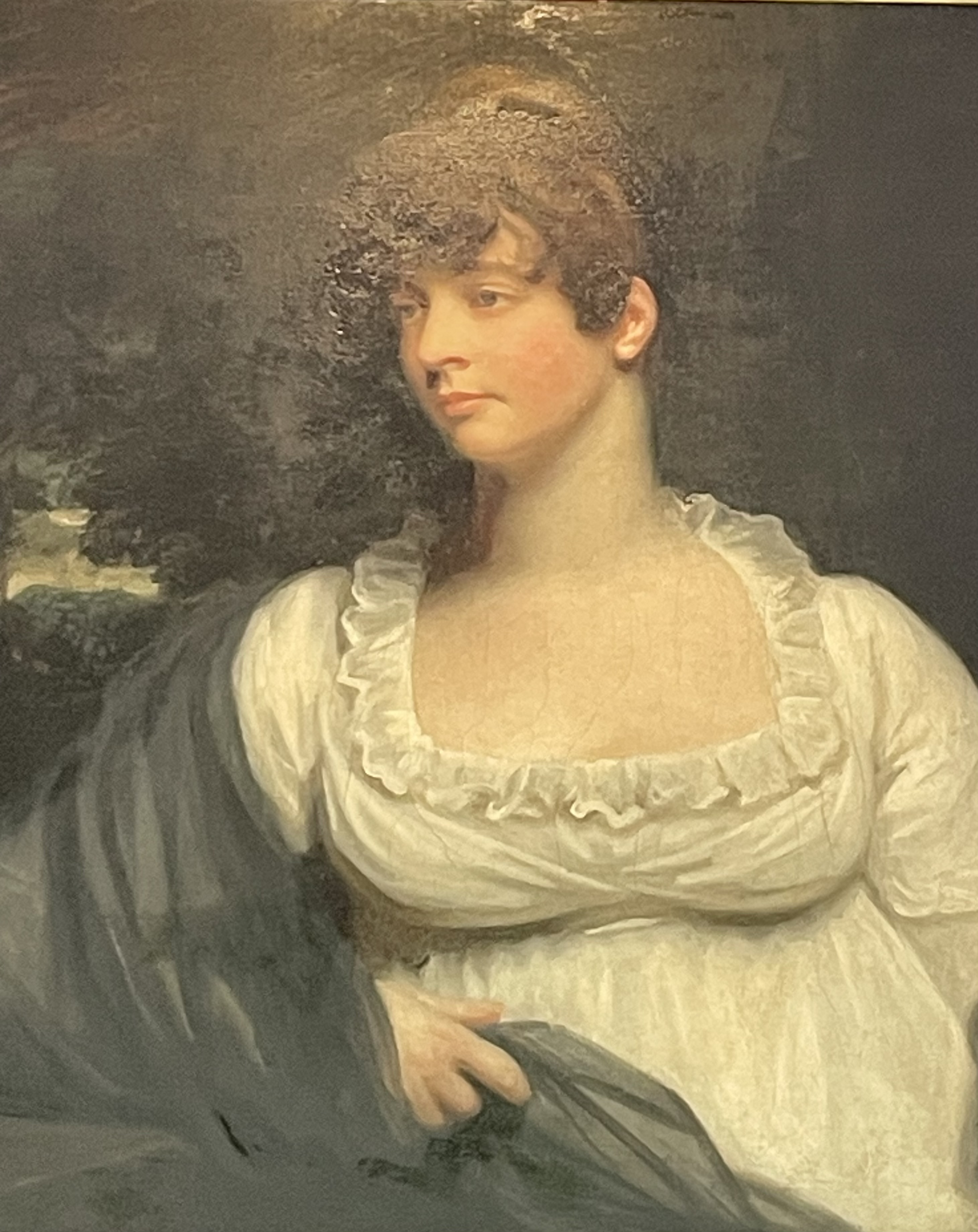
Catherine daughter of Earl Howe married the 1st Marquess of Sligo

The First Marquess of Sligo was married to Lady Louisa Catherine Howe, daughter of Richard Howe, 1st Earl Howe in 1787. After their marriage, she was known as the Countess of Altamont and then the Marchioness of Sligo. They had one child, Howe Peter who later succeeded his father as Second Marquess of Sligo.

A great-grandnephew was the British composer and poet, William Charles Denis Browne (1888–1915).

== Arms ==
Coat of arms of John Browne, 1st Marquess of Sligo
Crest An eagle, displayed, vert. Escutcheon Sable, three lions, passant, in bend, argent, between four bendlets, of the last. Supporters Dexter, a talbot, proper, gorged with a baron’s coronet ; Sinister, a horse, argent Motto Suivez raison (Follow reason). Orders The Most Illustrious Order of St. Patrick - Knight (KP).

Parliament of Ireland
Preceded by James Browne; John FitzGibbon	Member of Parliament for Jamestown; 1776–1780; With: Richard Martin	Succeeded by Richard Martin; John Hall
Parliament of the United Kingdom
New title	Representative peer for Ireland; 1800–1809	Succeeded by The Viscount Mountjoy
Peerage of Ireland
New creation	Marquess of Sligo; 1800–1809	Succeeded by Howe Browne
Preceded by Peter Browne	Earl of Altamont; 1780–1809	Succeeded by Howe Browne
Peerage of the United Kingdom
New creation	Baron Monteagle; 1806–1809	Succeeded by Howe Browne
