= John Browne, 4th Marquess of Sligo =

John Thomas Browne, 4th Marquess of Sligo (10 September 1824 – 30 December 1903), styled Lord John Browne until 1868, was an Irish politician and naval commander.

Browne served as a Liberal Member of Parliament for County Mayo in Ireland from 1857 to 1868. He had previously served as an officer of the Royal Navy.

In 1896, Browne became Marquess of Sligo on the death of his elder brother, the 3rd Marquess, also inheriting some 114,900 acres (465 km^{2}) of land and the family seat at Westport House, Westport, County Mayo. He died unmarried and was succeeded by his brother, Henry.

== Arms ==
Coat of arms of John Browne, 4th Marquess of Sligo
Crest An eagle, displayed, vert. Escutcheon Sable, three lions, passant, in bend, argent, between four bendlets, of the last. Supporters Dexter, a talbot, proper, gorged with a baron’s coronet ; Sinister, a horse, argent Motto Suivez raison (Follow reason).

Parliament of the United Kingdom
Preceded by Roger Palmer; George Henry Moore	Member of Parliament for County Mayo; 1857 – 1868; With: Roger Palmer 1857–1865; Lord Bingham 1865–1868	Succeeded by Lord Bingham; George Henry Moore
Peerage of Ireland
Preceded by George John Browne	Marquess of Sligo; 1896–1903	Succeeded by Henry Ulick Browne
