= Sir William Brabazon, 2nd Baronet =

Irish politician (1778–1840)

Sir William John Brabazon, 2nd Baronet (16 September 1778 – 24 October 1840), was an Irish Member of Parliament.

== Background ==
Brabazon was born in County Mayo and educated at Trinity College Dublin.

== Career ==
He succeeded as second Baronet, of Newpark in County Mayo, on 3 July 1803. On 24 January 1835 he was elected one of the Members of Parliament for County Mayo in the United Kingdom House of Commons, serving until 1840. On his death the baronetcy became extinct.

Parliament of the United Kingdom
Preceded by John Denis Browne; Dominick Browne	Member of Parliament for County Mayo; 1835 – 1840; With: Dominick Browne to 1836; Robert Dillon Browne from 1836	Succeeded by Mark Blake; Robert Dillon Browne
Baronetage of Ireland
Preceded by Anthony Brabazon	Baronet (of Newpark); 1803–1840	Extinct
