= George Bingham, 4th Earl of Lucan =

Irish peer and soldier

The Right Honourable The Earl of Lucan KP

Member of Parliament for County Mayo
- In office 1865–1874 Serving with Lord John Browne, George Henry Moore, George Ekins Browne
- Preceded by: Roger William Henry Palmer; Lord John Browne
- Succeeded by: George Ekins Browne; Thomas Tighe

Personal details
- Born: Charles George Bingham; 8 May 1830
- Died: 5 June 1914 (aged 84)
- Spouse: Lady Cecilia Catherine Gordon-Lennox (m. 1859; died 1910)
- Children: 7
- Parent(s): George Bingham, 3rd Earl of Lucan; Lady Anne Brudenell
- Relatives: Robert Brudenell, 6th Earl of Cardigan (grandfather)
- Education: Rugby School

Charles George Bingham, 4th Earl of Lucan, KP (8 May 1830 – 5 June 1914), styled Lord Bingham from 1839 to 1888, was an Irish peer and soldier.

== Early life ==
He was the eldest son of George Bingham, 3rd Earl of Lucan and Lady Anne Brudenell. His maternal grandparents were Robert Brudenell, 6th Earl of Cardigan and Penelope Anne Cooke.

He was educated at Rugby School and entered the Army.

== Career ==
He became Lieutenant-Colonel of the Coldstream Guards and served as aide-de-camp to his father, who commanded the cavalry division during the Crimean War. He succeeded his father to the earldom in 1888.

He was elected a Member of Parliament for County Mayo from 1865 to 1874. He was appointed Vice-Admiral of Connaught in 1889, and Lord Lieutenant and Custos Rotulorum for County Mayo in 1901. He was created a Knight of St. Patrick in 1899.

== Personal life ==
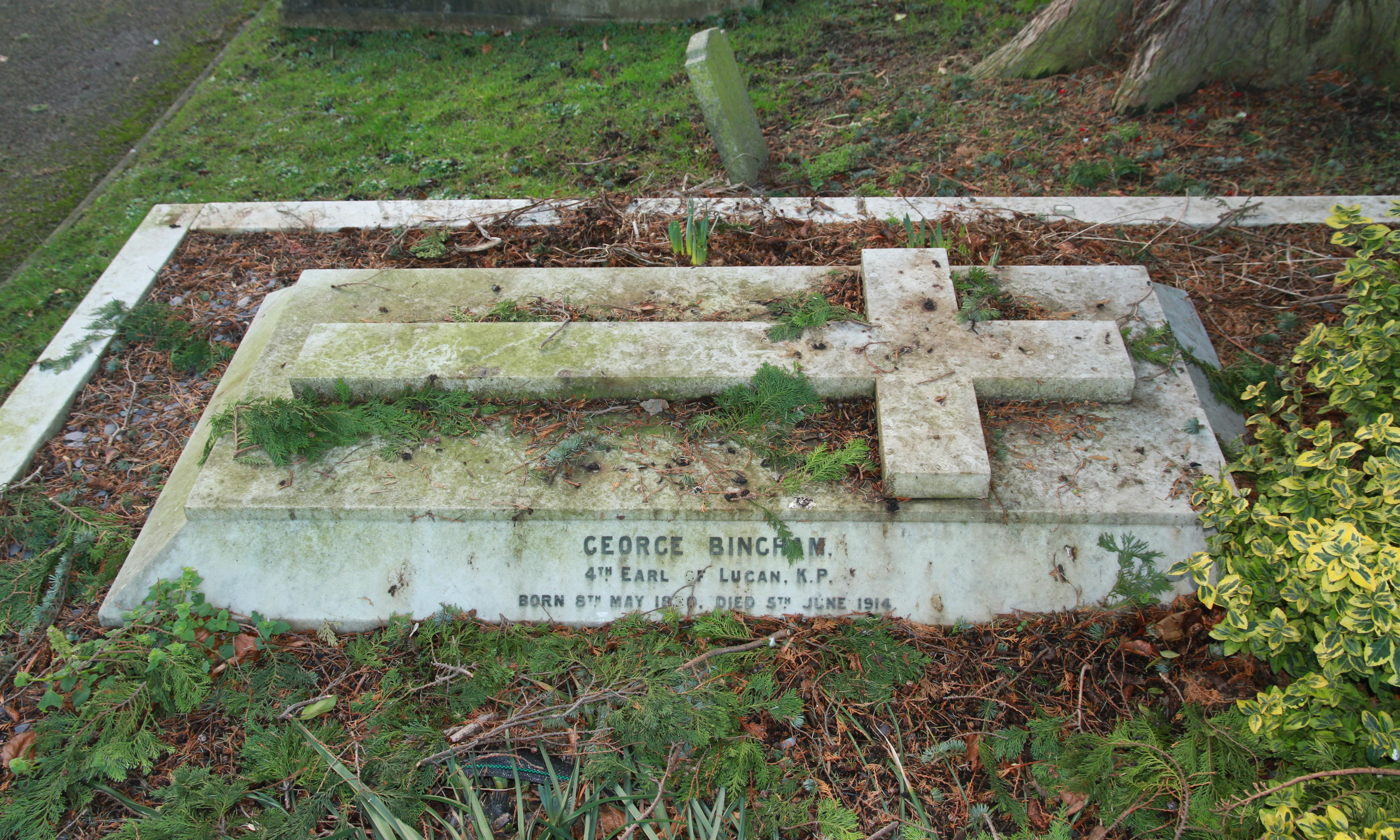
Grave of the 4th Earl of Lucan in All Saints' parish churchyard, Laleham, Middlesex

On 17 November 1859, Lord Bingham married Lady Cecilia Catherine Gordon-Lennox (1838–1910), the youngest daughter of Charles Gordon-Lennox, 5th Duke of Richmond and Lady Caroline Paget (herself the eldest daughter of Henry Paget, 1st Marquess of Anglesey and Lady Caroline Elizabeth Villiers). Together, they had seven children:

- George Bingham, 5th Earl of Lucan (1860–1949), who married Violet Sylvia Blanche Spender Clay, a daughter of Joseph Spender Clay and Elizabeth Sydney Garrett, in 1896.
- Sir Cecil Edward Bingham (1861–1934), a major general of the British Army.
- Sir Francis Richard Bingham (1863–1935), a major general of the British Army.
- Alexander Frederick Bingham (1864–1909).
- Albert Edward Bingham (1866–1941).
- Lady Rosalind Cecilia Caroline Bingham (1869–1958), who married James Hamilton, 3rd Duke of Abercorn. Their descendants included Diana, Princess of Wales.
- Capt. Lionel Ernest Bingham (1876–1927).

Lord Lucan died on 5 June 1914. He was succeeded in the title by his eldest son George.

=== Descendants ===
Through his daughter Rosalind, he is a direct ancestor of Diana, Princess of Wales.

== Ancestry ==
Ancestors of George Bingham, 4th Earl of Lucan

16. Sir John Bingham, 5th Baronet, of Castlebar
8. Charles Bingham, 1st Earl of Lucan
17. Anne Vesey
4. Richard Bingham, 2nd Earl of Lucan
18. Sir James Smith
9. Margaret Smith
19. Grace Dyke
2. George Bingham, 3rd Earl of Lucan
20. Thomas Belasyse, 1st Earl Fauconberg
10. Henry Belasyse, 2nd Earl Fauconberg
21. Catherine Fowler
5. Lady Elizabeth Belasyse
22. Sir Matthew Lamb, 1st Baronet, of Brocket Hall
11. Charlotte Lamb
23. Charlotte Cooke
1. George Bingham, 4th Earl of Lucan
24. George Brudenell, 3rd Earl of Cardigan
12. Hon. Robert Brudenell
25. Lady Elizabeth Bruce
6. Robert Brudenell, 6th Earl of Cardigan
26. Sir Cecil Bishopp, 6th Baronet, of Parham
13. Anne Bishopp
27. Anne Boscawen
3. Lady Anne Brudenell
28. George Cooke
14. George John Cooke
29. Catherine Twysden
7. Penelope Anne Cooke
30. Sir William Bowyer, 3rd Baronet, of Denham Court
15. Penelope Bowyer
31. Anne Stonhouse

Parliament of the United Kingdom
Preceded by Roger William Henry Palmer; Lord John Browne	Member of Parliament for County Mayo; 1865–1874; With: Lord John Browne 1865–1868; George Henry Moore 1868–1870; George Ekins Browne 1870–1874	Succeeded by George Ekins Browne; Thomas Tighe
Political offices
Preceded by The Earl of Portarlington	Representative peer for Ireland; 1889–1914	Succeeded by The Earl of Lucan
Honorary titles
Preceded by The Earl of Arran	Lord Lieutenant of Mayo; 1901–1914	Succeeded by The Marquess of Sligo
Peerage of Ireland
Preceded by George Bingham	Earl of Lucan; 1888–1914	Succeeded by George Bingham
