= John O'Connor Power =

Irish Fenian and politician (1846–1919)

Member of Parliament for County Mayo
- In office 29 May 1874 – 18 December 1885

President of the Irish Republican Brotherhood
- In office 1882–1891
- Preceded by: Charles Kickham
- Succeeded by: John O'Leary

Personal details
- Born: 13 February 1846 Clashaganny, County Roscommon
- Died: 21 February 1919 (aged 73) Putney, London
- Resting place: Abney Park Cemetery, Stoke Newington, London
- Party: Home Rule League (from 1874); Irish Parliamentary Party (1874–1884) Radical Liberal (from 1885)
- Spouse(s): Avis Weiss, née Hooke
- Parent(s): Patrick Power, Mary O'Connor
- Education: St Jarlath's College, Tuam, County Galway.
- Profession: Orator, Politician, lawyer, radical journalist
- Known for: Irish Republican leader

John O'Connor Power (13 February 1846 – 21 February 1919) was an Irish Fenian and a Home Rule League and Irish Parliamentary Party politician and as MP in the House of Commons of the United Kingdom of Great Britain and Ireland represented County Mayo from June 1874 to 1885. From 1881, he practised as a barrister specialising in criminal law and campaigning for penal reform.

== Early radical years ==
He was born in Clashaganny, County Roscommon and was the third son of Patrick Power from Ballinasloe and his wife Mary O'Connor of County Roscommon, during the Great Famine years. He contracted smallpox and spent some time in the Ballinasloe Fever hospital, which was housed in the workhouse. On the death of his parents he was raised by his aunt, Catherine O'Connor Duffield, in her home over her shop and bakery in Society Street. At fifteen years of age, he went to live with relatives in Lancashire where he recruited for the Irish Republican Brotherhood and took up a trade in house painting. It was here that he first met Michael Davitt.

He became known to the police under alias names 'John Fleming', 'John Webster', 'Charles Ferguson'. An organiser on the abortive raid on Chester Castle in February 1867, he evaded capture and was sent to the United States later that year at the age of 21 to discuss reorganisation of the Fenians. After his return he was arrested in Dublin on 17 February 1868 and spent five months in Kilmainham and Mountjoy jails. The County of Dublin Gaol, Kilmainham file holds a 'photograph and description of a prisoner who was formerly in custody under the Lord Lieutenant's warrant, charged with treasonable practices and discharged on bail on 29 July 1868.' John Power, alias John Webster, alias Charles Fleming was a Roman Catholic who was born in County Roscommon. He was 5 ft 9in, 'stout', with a long face, dark brown hair, grey eyes, a large nose and a large mouth. His whiskers were dark and he had no beard. His fresh complexion was pitted and he had a large wart on the small finger of his left hand. His make was 'ordinary'. He was a newspaper reporter and lived in Lancashire, in Bolton or in Rochdale.

He was a member of the Irish Republican Brotherhood (IRB) Supreme Council and was believed to be involved in gun-running (a matter on which in later life he threatened legal action). While he remained an active member during his early years in Parliament, as early as 1868–69 he had promoted co-operation with constitutional politicians such as George Henry Moore. It was the beginning of the New Departure.

From January 1871 to 1874 he was a student and teacher at St. Jarlath's College, Tuam, with his fees and expenses paid by a combination of teaching and lectures in Britain and America. In his final year he was Professor of Humanities in the college.

== Early parliamentary years ==
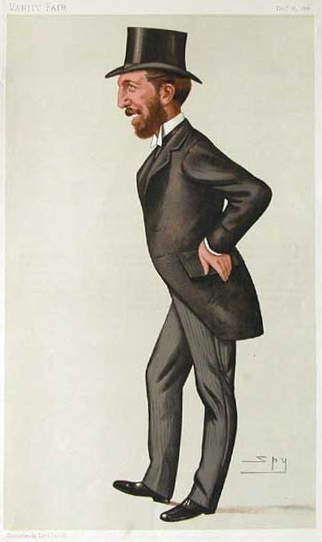
"the brains of Obstruction" Caricature by "Spy" (Leslie Ward) in Vanity Fair, 25 December 1886

While still at St. Jarlath's, Power signalled his intention in January 1874 to stand for election to the British House of Commons; and to take the oath of allegiance to the Queen and his seat if elected. Although there was clerical opposition, he was supported by John MacHale, Archbishop of Tuam and Fr Ulick Burke, President of St Jarlath's, and was successful at the 1874 County Mayo by-election.

In the 1874 Parliament, dominated by Disraeli's Conservatives, Isaac Butt's policy of attempting to achieve Irish nationalist objectives by working with the Liberals and Conservatives and respecting House traditions, failed; the Irish minority was simply ignored.

O'Connor Power and J.G. Biggar therefore pioneered the new policy of obstructionism, whereby they obstructed House of Commons business by making long speeches and manipulating its procedures. They were joined in this more successful policy by Charles Stewart Parnell on his election in April 1875. The O'Donoghue, M.P. for County Kerry, in a letter to Cardinal Cullen, 6 August 1877, denounced the strategy: 'It is Fenianism in a new form.'

In August 1875 O'Connor Power was interviewed by his close associate James Joseph O'Kelly for an article in the New York Herald prior to his six-month tour of North America to promote Home Rule. The Herald's editorial suggested that Power was 'the most able, eloquent and competent available man' to encourage the constitutional approach.

O'Connor Power spoke strongly and repeatedly in Parliament from 1874 to 1877 for amnesty for Michael Davitt, imprisoned in Dartmoor, and other Fenian prisoners, and brought to notice perceived unfairness of their treatment as common criminals rather than as political prisoners. This led to Gladstone lending his support to Fenian amnesty and he spent three weeks in Killruddery House, County Wicklow, from mid-October to 11 November. Davitt was released early on 19 December 1877, and Fenians Thomas Chambers, Charles McCarthy and John Patrick O'Brien followed in January 1878. Charles McCarthy collapsed and died in Dublin shortly after his release. The ex-prisoners travelled back to London and, 13 February, visited O'Connor Power in 'a private room in Parliament House, where they wrote out their statements giving the details of sufferings endured and the treatment to which they had been subjected ... He [O'Connor Power] and Davitt therefore had them printed in pamphlet form and circulated.' This was published, with a selection of O'Connor Power's speeches on amnesty in the House of Commons, in March 1878.

In 1876, O'Connor Power and Parnell were sent to the United States by the Home Rule League to congratulate the President Ulysses S. Grant on the American Centennial. At an informal meeting with the President, they asked that Ireland's bid for independence be given recognition. Power presented an address to the House of Representatives and on 4 March 1877 the House passed a unanimous resolution recognising the services rendered by Irishmen to the United States and concluded that the principles of self-government be established as a sacred heritage to all future generations. He also used the American visit to resume contact with nationalist supporters, and is almost certainly the IRB agent referred to as 'Shields'.

In 1876, Power was a guest speaker at the Durham Miners' Gala.

O'Connor Power was best known for his work in the radical wing of the Home Rule League and support for tenant farmers' rights, on which he spoke forcefully in Parliament,

He was generally considered by the Fenians to have sold out to constitutionalism during his career. Along with J. G. Biggar, he was expelled from the IRB Supreme Council in 1876. The Fenians of the "New Departure" refused to work with him and it was Parnell who become the man to bridge the gap between the Fenians and constitutionalists. The IRB expelled Parliamentarians. Under no circumstances should the Fenians co-operate with the constitutional policy. O'Connor Power resigned, 'Our great idea was to keep the spirit of nationality alive.' The North of England seceded, withdrawing allegiance to the Supreme Council. The move cost the IRB a significant loss of membership. In July 1906 Dr William Carroll wrote to John Devoy that at that time the original Home Rulers lost much of the Fenian support when the IRB expelled them, 'although at a meeting near Manchester, England, at which Davitt, Chambers and other Fenians met the IRB men, a modus vivendi was agreed upon which enabled both to go on with their work without clashing.'

T. D. Sullivan presents an anecdote from 1876 that illustrates the distance that grew between O'Connor Power in his Home Rule days and some of his former radical nationalist colleagues:

An immense mass of people assembled in the Free Trade Hall [Manchester] on the 16 September 1876, to hear a lecture from Mr. John O'Connor Power, MP, on a non-political subject. The chair was taken by Mr. J. G. Biggar, MP. On rising to introduce the lecturer, he soon discerned that trouble was impending, that there was, so to say, "a storm in the offing." An "Advanced" person, a Mr. Flesh of Ramsbottom, came on the Platform and informed him that at a meeting of Nationalists held on the previous evening, it was decided that the lecture might be allowed to proceed only on the condition that the lecturer should first answer satisfactorily a series of questions which had been drawn up for him. The main purpose of those interrogatories was to ascertain whether he held and was prepared to support the principles of Wolfe Tone, Lord Edward Fitzgerald, and Robert Emmet. The chairman said those questions were not in order, as the lecture was to be on a non-political subject; however, he would leave it to the lecturer to deal with the queries as he thought fit, Mr. O'Connor Power then came to the front and said, amidst much noise, that with regard to the questions that had been read, his view was identical with that of the chairman. He begged leave to point out – He could say no more: the platform was rushed; there was a smashing of chairs and tables, a noise of heavy blows, and of fierce exclamations from men engaged in close combat, mingled with the shouts and screams of women, while blood flowed freely from many wounded persons ... The subject of Mr. O'Connor Power's intended lecture was "Irish Wit and Humour".

O'Connor Power delivered the lecture, within a fortnight, in the same hall, and Biggar again presided. This time, "the Irish of Manchester and Liverpool, revolutionaries and constitutionalists, banded together to put down any rowdyism should it again arise; but instead of that, O'Connor Power was received with 'deafening cheers, again and again repeated' according to a newspaper report".

O'Connor Power had an uneasy working relationship with Parnell, who he thought was "a respectable mediocrity". T. M. Healy narrates an incident from 1878:

... I wrote Maurice:

London,
October, '78.
"Would it be possible to get up a meeting in Lismore, and invite Parnell? The resolution I moved in Dublin at the Confederation of Great Britain was at his request, upon a suggestion of my own. If he could have O'Connor Power at his elbow continually it would be a good thing, as Power understands the necessities of agitation, and Parnell doesn't. I hope he will make a good fist of his answer to Butt, though I have never been persuaded that he shines as a letter-writer. Dan Crilly told me Parnell's first contribution to the Liverpool Argus (mentioned in my London letter) was not worth much, and though he promised to insert it, he has failed me."

O'Connor Power and Parnell were not kindred spirits. Power was an able and eloquent man, "reeking of the common clay", at which Parnell's aristocratic sensitiveness recoiled. "Of their differences I hinted to my brother":

London,
24 November 1878.
"I met O'Connor Power, and he was unaware, until I told him, that his name was down to propose one of the resolutions in Dublin. He expressed disgust, and said he told the Dublin people he would not go over, and that it was only another piece of their cowardice in being afraid to face Butt themselves.

I was aware of the stories told about Power, but what is the use of repeating them? Parnell has been careful to tell me his views about Power (and so has Biggar), but I have defended him to them, and think they should make allowance for his poverty and position. Parnell told Power to his face that he was "a damned scoundrel," and Power made a coarse reply ..."

== Land War ==
However, O'Connor Power retained credibility with small tenant farmers and addressed the Tenant-Right Meeting at Irishtown, County Mayo on 20 April 1879, which launched the protest movement that led to the Irish National Land League. He was 'the only member of Parliament invited to or who attended the historic Irishtown meeting.'

T. M. Healy writes of the Irishtown meeting:

'Power's presence there gave birth to the Land League and made history ... No reporters attended the meeting. Power called on me when he returned to London to give an account of it. From what he said I realised that a new portent had arisen out of a leaden sky. He related that footmen in legions, and horsemen in squadrons, gathered round him to demand reductions of rent. The horsemen, he declared, were organised like cavalry regiments. The police were powerless, and Power foreshadowed that Ireland was on the verge of a movement which would end a dismal chapter. Yet his meeting was unnoted, save by a local weekly The Connaught Telegraph, owned by James Daly.'

William O'Brien recounts:

'The whole countryside had flocked together, as at a word of command, including horsemen enough to form a regiment of cavalry, and Mr. Power, who had sounded all the subterranean depths of Irish disaffection, spoke very solemnly of what was coming. It was the first whisper I heard of the Land League movement, although even the name was not yet invented.'

After Parnell and Davitt addressed the follow-up meeting at Westport, County Mayo on 8 June 1879 they took control of the growing Land War. T. M. Healy gives his view of how O'Connor Power was frozen out of the Land League:

Stirrings of ambition and resentment may have been ingredients in Parnell's action in joining Davitt and cold-shouldering Power, but what can lessen admiration for the pluck with which he threw himself into a movement which involved him and his relatives in danger and loss? His rents in County Wicklow and those of his brothers in Armagh and Carlow were at stake.

Towards the close of the session Power wrote me:

House of Commons,
4 August 1879.
My Dear Healy,
Finegan told me you would be down to-night, but I have not been so fortunate as to come across you.

If you have seen my article in the Fortnightly, I would feel obliged by your noticing it in your letter this week. The cynical Saturday Review noticed it fairly enough, but I have seen no notice of it in any Irish paper."
Ever sincerely,
J. O'Connor Power.

I complied, but owing to his strained relations with Parnell and Biggar, he went to Dublin to examine the position, and wrote me:

"... Davitt met me on my arrival here – a reception unexpected on my part. He is writing an appeal to the Irish at home and abroad, for funds to carry on the Land agitation, and working hard to abolish the Home Rule League.

I am here just in time for Thursday's meeting, when the Home Rule League will be "tried for life" and perhaps condemned. Parnell's resolutions evidently tend in that direction."

Power's letter was written from the lodgings of Tom Brennan, who three months later, became secretary to the Land League, when Davitt was made its chief organiser, and Parnell (with Dillon) was accredited envoy to the United States.

Power, who started the movement, was left "festering outside-the breastworks," without control or influence in the new organisation.

In 'The Irish Land Agitation', published in the Nineteenth Century, December 1879, O'Connor Power writes on the land question, on the cry for land reform and the demands of the Irish National Land League, 'it may be useful for one connected with the movement to lay before English readers a statement explaining its causes, and presenting for serious consideration its aims and hopes and possible results.' The evils of the Irish land system must be urgently addressed and resolved:

'More than three years ago I ventured during a debate in the House of Commons on the Irish land question, to predict that if the proposal then before the House to deprive the landlords of the power of eviction and rack-renting – that is to say the proposal in favour of fixity of tenure at fair rents – was not accepted, the Irish people would rise up and protest against the institution of landlordism, root and branch, and demand its abolition.'

Though originally a friend, Davitt changed his opinion of O'Connor Power, describing him in his 'Jottings In Solitary' of 1881–1882 as a "renegade to former nationalist principles: unscrupulously ambitious and untrustworthy". When Davitt moved to London he renewed his friendship with O'Connor Power. Michael MacDonagh wrote "O'Connor Power was above the suspicion of interested motives".

== The 1880 Parliament ==
With the support of Michael Davitt, Thomas Brennan and a local curate, Father John O'Malley, Power was re-elected for the two-member County Mayo constituency in the 1880 general election, topping the poll. Shortly afterwards, on 28 May 1880, O'Connor Power introduced the Compensation for Disturbance Bill in the House of Commons:

'That being the scheme which yesterday in connection with the Compensation for Disturbance Bill, I pointed out to your Lordships was formally introduced in the House of Commons at the instance of the Land League by Mr O'Connor Power, then one of the members for Mayo, and the principle of which was afterwards adopted by the Government of the day and passed, by the second reading of the Compensation for Disturbance Bill through that House.'

The Biograph and Review describes him as ‘the ablest of the Home Rule party…. If he is an agitator, he is at least an honest one. He does not seek popularity as a demagogue. Anyone who knows him, can testify to his honest and disinterested alliance with the Home Rule party, to his unwillingness for unnecessary parade, to his modest, unassuming appearance which is totally unlike that of a man who seeks fame and emolument by demagogic domination, or parliamentary obstruction. He only wants to change and redress the condition of his unfortunate countrymen … a writer of great vigour and literary skill. He does not, as some of his countrymen do, sacrifice sense to sound, and indulge in florid diction, Johnsonian derivatives, or unmeaning platitudes.’

== Later years ==
He registered as a student of the Middle Temple in 1878, four years after his election to Parliament in 1874. He qualified in 1881, and spent his later years as a barrister.

He was a prominent journalist, writing throughout his life for newspapers and periodicals in Ireland, England and North America. He was a regular contributor to the Manchester Guardian. As a leader-writer for the Liberal Daily Chronicle, he was instrumental in cementing the Irish Liberal/Labour Alliance. He was the author of Parnell’s obituary in the newspaper. He contributed articles to The Speaker, a weekly periodical.

He was Prior of the Johnson Club in 1888. With his friends, Richard Barry O'Brien, Charles Russell, Baron Russell of Killowen, Michael MacDonagh and Alfred Perceval Graves, he was an active member of the Irish Literary Society.

He expressed a strong interest in the Irish language.

He stood as a Liberal in Kennington (a seat with a substantial Irish electorate) in the 1885 general election, losing to a Conservative candidate; and attempted as a Gladstone Liberal to regain in his old heartland, Mayo West in 1892, losing to an Anti-Parnellite Irish National Federation candidate. A Radical Liberal, he was an active member of the National Liberal Club and presided over the training of aspirant politicians in practical politics. He promoted Proportional representation. He toured the Liberal clubs of Britain, promoting Home Rule and the reform of the legislative system – devolution of power to four national committees representing England, Scotland, Wales and Ireland. The committee members, representing each nationality, would determine ‘the legislation of a purely local character.’ He urged a curb to the powers of the House of Lords. He continued to lobby British governments for the next thirty years and 'was universally recognised as an able and conscientious worker in all English and Irish reforms ...'

In December 1878 the Quaker Lewis Fry won a seat in Bristol North with the help of the Irish vote. He was backed by the Home Rule Confederation of Great Britain and O'Connor Power, who was present at the meeting before the poll at Colston Hall. At short notice, O'Connor Power stood as a Liberal (Radical) candidate for Bristol South in the 1895 general election, but again failed to re-enter Parliament. In the course of the election campaign, he threatened legal action when a Conservative paper accused him of having taken the oath of an illegal organisation. In 1897, he withdrew his candidature for Bristol South because of the attitude of the Liberal party towards Home Rule. As an Irish Nationalist, he would not stand for a Liberal constituency "while any doubt existed as to the priority of Home Rule in the programme of the Liberal and Radical party".

O'Connor Power was a guest of honour at John Dillon's table at the Ninety-Eight Celebration in London on St.Patrick's Day, 1898. There were over seven hundred Nationalists present. He and William O'Brien gave the principal toasts:

'[O'Connor Power believed] no more justifiable insurrection had, in his judgement, taken place in the history of the world than the Irish rebellion of a hundred years ago. A rebel was a patriot who failed – a patriot was a rebel who succeeded, and he thought he did not misinterpret the spirit of that assembly if he said they were ready to toast the men of '98 in either capacity. He should never cease to be grateful to the United Irishmen, not only because they had bequeathed an example of courageous patriotism, but because they had given them one cardinal principle of high policy, and that was the principle of a united Ireland. He trusted that this memorable year would not be allowed to pass away without renewed efforts being made to restore union in the National Union, at present so unhappily divided.'

In June 1916 O'Connor Power forcefully condemned the suspension of Home Rule:

'The suspension of the Home Rule Act was advocated in the name of peace and conciliation, and we know the result. This scheme [partition] is supported on the same ground and will be followed as surely by similar disillusion and disappointment. I have read speeches of members of Parliament calling upon the young men of Ireland to go to the front because of the Home Rule Act. The brave young fellows rushed to the recruiting offices in tens of thousands: most of whom now sleep their last sleep in the blood-stained fields of Europe. They did not offer up their lives for a mutilated Ireland but for one united from sea to sea, and they did so with the promise of their leaders that national unity would never be given away. I ask is faith not to be kept with the dead? If so, the infamy of the broken Treaty of Limerick will be outdone by the betrayal of today.'

In September 1893 he married Avis Weiss, née Hooke, the wealthy widow of a surgeon. Bernard Charles Molloy M.P., a Middle Temple lawyer and penal reformer, was best man. Avis was educated at the Quaker school, Stoke Newington, and trained as a nurse at St Bartholomew's, working for many years in the West London hospital for the working class. They were married for over two decades and Avis was at his bedside when, after a long illness, he died peacefully at home in Putney, London. He was buried in Abney Park Garden Cemetery, Stoke Newington, North London, in his wife's family plot, 28 February 1919.

== Obituary ==
The death in London, of Mr John O'Connor Power recalls the earlier days of the land agitation, when he figured, as MP for Mayo, with Parnell and Biggar in their famous obstruction tactics in Parliament, and was one of those suspended after the great scenes in 1881 arising out of Davitt's arrest. Belonging to a Mayo family, he was born in Roscommon in 1846, and is believed to have been one of the chief organisers of the abortive Fenian raid on Chester Castle in '67. As a public orator he aroused the keenest enthusiasm, while in Parliament, he was forceful and eloquent. He was one of the speakers at the Irishtown meeting when the Land League was launched. In Parliament, since 1874, as a supporter of Butt, he was again returned in '80 with Parnell, but the latter convinced that their policies were growing divergent, elected to sit for Cork city, for which he was also returned. Though there was no open rupture, Power and Parnell drifted further apart, and in 1885 the former dropped out, having previously had notable differences with Messrs Parnell, Sexton and Healy. Since then Power twice unsuccessfully stood for English constituencies as a Radical. Davitt and he maintained their friendship. In 1893 Power married the widow of Mr H. F Weiss, FRCS. One of his books dealt with the art of oratory. He was called to the English Bar in 1881. The London Evening Standard classes him as an orator with Gladstone and Bright. (Irish Independent, 24 February 1919)

== In literature ==
'And three's here for repeat of the unium! Place the scaurs wore on your groot big bailey bill, he apullajibed, the O'Colonel Power, latterly distanted from the O'Conner Dan, so promonitory himself that he was obliffious of the headth of the hosth that rose before him ...' James Joyce, Finnegans Wake, 1939

' [at Irishtown] Mr. O'Connor Power said that public opinion must be organised, and that there's nothing tyrants dread so much as exposure. He said evictions must be stopped and no more emigration must be allowed unless the people want to go. You should have heard them cheer at that – I wonder did they really believe anything would come of it, but at least the thought did something for them.' Eilís Dillon, Across the Bitter Sea, 1973.

== Quotations ==
- "The land of Ireland for the people of Ireland." 26 October 1878 at the founding meeting of the Mayo Tenants' Defence Association, Castlebar, as reported in the Connaught Telegraph, 2 November 1878.
- "The mules of politics: without pride of ancestry, or hope of posterity." Quoted in H. H. Asquith, Memories and Reflections, vol I, p. 123. Oxford Book of Quotations, second edition.
- "The true patriot is not the one who clamours to lead the parade but the man who walks last." 17 March 1888, Louisville, Kentucky.
- "Nothing is so fatal to corruption as publicity and discussion." J. O'Connor Power, 'Edmund Burke and His Abiding Influence',1897.
- "The triumph of faction means the defeat of freedom." Freeman's Journal, 20 October 1877.
- "The rarest form of mental power is the power of seeing facts." John O'Connor Power, The Making of an Orator, 1906, p. 33.

== Publications ==
- Irish political prisoners: Speeches of John O'Connor Power in the House of Commons on the subject of amnesty, &c., and a statement by Mr. Michael Davitt on prison treatment, London : [March 1878]
- Irish political prisoners: enquiry into the prison treatment & cause of death of the late Color-Sergeant M'Carthy, and letter to Sir James T. Ingham, London: White & Fawcett, [1878].
- 'Fallacies About Home Rule,' J. O'Connor Power, Fortnightly Review, Aug. 1879, 224–35
- "The Irish Land Agitation", The Nineteenth Century, vol.6 no.34, December 1879, 953–67.
- "The Irish in England", The Fortnightly Review 27 (1880), 410–421.
- Lecture on The Philosophy of Irish History: delivered in the Round Room of the Rotundo, Dublin, Monday, 26 April 1880, John O'Connor Power, Edmund Dwyer Gray, Dublin, Sheridan & Lincoln, 15 pages.
- Foreign Parliaments: Their Constitution and Modes of Procedure, O'Connor Power, M.P., Reprinted from the Bath Herald, 19 November 1884. The Herald Office, Bath.
- 'The New Reform' J. O'Connor Power, Nineteenth Century, Jan. 1885, 15–24.
- The Anglo-Irish Quarrel; a Plea for Peace ... a reprint of the recent articles in the Manchester Guardian, revised by the author, London: National Press Agency, January 1886.
- "FEBRUARY 13TH, 1893", The Speaker, 18 February 1893.
- "Edmund Burke and his Abiding Influence", in The North American Review 165:493 (December 1897), 666–81.
- The Making of an Orator, with examples from great masterpieces of ancient and modern eloquence, London: Methuen, 1906.
- The Making of an Orator, (Legacy Reprint Series), Whitefish: Kessinger Publishing, 2007, ISBN 978-144371780-9

== Pictures ==
- T. W. Moody, Davitt and Irish Revolution 1846–62, Plate V (taken when in custody at Kilmainham Gaol, 1868).
- Westminster Portrait, J.O'Connor Power, seated, holding letter from Michael Davitt in Dartmoor prison, 1877. The Parliamentary Archives, UK.
- Westminster Portrait, J O'Connor Power, 1883. The Parliamentary Archives, UK.
- Sir Leslie Ward, Caricature, 1886, held in the National Portrait Gallery (London), no. 3293. Original of cartoon by the 'Spy', "the brains of Obstruction", published in Vanity Fair, 25 December 1886.
- Bust of John O'Connor Power, M.P., R.H.A., 1881. by John Lawlor. Entry in Walter Strickland, 'Dictionary of Irish Artists' (1913).

Parliament of the United Kingdom
Preceded by Thomas Tighe; George Ekins Browne	Member of Parliament for County Mayo; 1874 – 1885; With: George Ekins Browne 1874–1880; Charles Stewart Parnell 1880; Isaac Nelson 1880–1885	Constituency divided
