= Brabazon baronets =

Extinct baronetcy in the Baronetage of Ireland

The Brabazon Baronetcy, of Newpark in the County of Mayo, was a title in the baronetage of Ireland. It was created on 16 December 1797 for Anthony Brabazon. He was the eldest son and heir of George Brabazon, of New Park in County Mayo, fourth in descent from Sir Anthony Brabazon of Ballinasloe Castle, younger brother of Edward Brabazon, 1st Baron Ardee, ancestor of the Earls of Meath. His son, the second Baronet, represented County Mayo in Parliament. The title became extinct on his death in 1840. Brabazon Park was eventually inherited by Hugh Brabazon Higgins, only son of Luke Higgins of Castlebar by his second wife Catherine, sister of Sir Anthony Brabazon. He was a captain in the 15th Hussars, and adopted the surname of Brabazon by royal licence of 15 September 1852. He died in 1864, leaving issue.

== Brabazon baronets, of Newpark (1797) ==
- Sir Anthony Brabazon, 1st Baronet (c. 1750 – 3 July 1803). Brabazon was the eldest son and heir of George Brabazon, of New Park in County Mayo, fourth in descent from Sir Anthony Brabazon of Ballinasloe Castle, who was younger brother of Edward Brabazon, 1st Baron Ardee, ancestor of the Earls of Meath, by his wife Sarah, daughter of Dominick Burke, of Clorough in County Galway. His father died on 29 March 1780 and his mother in August 1797. On 16 December 1797 he was created a Baronet, of Newpark in the County of Mayo, in the Baronetage of Ireland, though for what services is unknown. In March 1774 he married Anne, eldest daughter of Sir Capel Molyneux, 3rd Baronet. Their children included:
  - an eldest son, who predeceased his father.
  - William John Brabazon, who succeeded to the baronetcy.
  - Anne Mary, who married Hercules Sharpe of Oaklands, in Westfield, Sussex; they were parents of
    - William John Sharpe, who adopted the surname of Brabazon by royal licence 23 April 1841
    - Hercules Brabazon Sharpe, of Brabazon Park, who adopted the surname of Brabazon by royal licence 9 August 1847
  - Sarah, who married as his second wife Henry Francis Roper-Curzon, 14th Baron Teynham, without issue.

Brabazon died on 3 July 1803 and was buried at Kilconduff, near Swinford. His widow survived him by many years.

- Sir William John Brabazon, 2nd Baronet (died 1840)

== Arms ==
Coat of arms of Brabazon of Newpark
Crest On a wreath, a mount Vert, thereon a falcon, rising, belled Or. Escutcheon Gules, on a bend Or, three martlets Sable. Supporters Dexter, a lamb murally crowned, in the mouth an olive branch, supporting the banner of Jerusalem; sinister, a tiger guard, navally crowned, in the mouth a palm branch, supporting the Union flag of Great Britain, with the inscription, 'Jerusalem, 1799' upon the cross of St. George. Motto Vota vita mea

== See also ==
- Earl of Meath
- Baron Brabazon of Tara
