= George Browne, 3rd Marquess of Sligo =

Irish peer

George John Browne
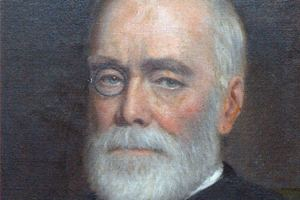

Marquess of Sligo
- In office 1845–1896
- Preceded by: Howe Browne
- Succeeded by: John Browne, 4th Marquess of Sligo

George John Browne, 3rd Marquess of Sligo (31 January 1820 – 30 August 1896), styled Earl of Altamont until 1845, was an Irish peer.

The son of Howe Browne, 2nd Marquess of Sligo, George Browne was educated at Eton and Trinity College, Cambridge. He married three times but died without male issue. He married,

- firstly, Ellen Smythe, daughter of the 6th Viscount Strangford,
- secondly, Julia Nugent, daughter of the 9th Earl of Westmeath and
- thirdly, Isabelle Raymonde de Peyronnet (1841–1927), daughter of Georgina Frances de Peyronnet and the Vicomte de Peyronnet. They had twin daughters, Isabelle Mary and Mary Isabelle Peyronnet Browne, born in London on 6 November 1881.

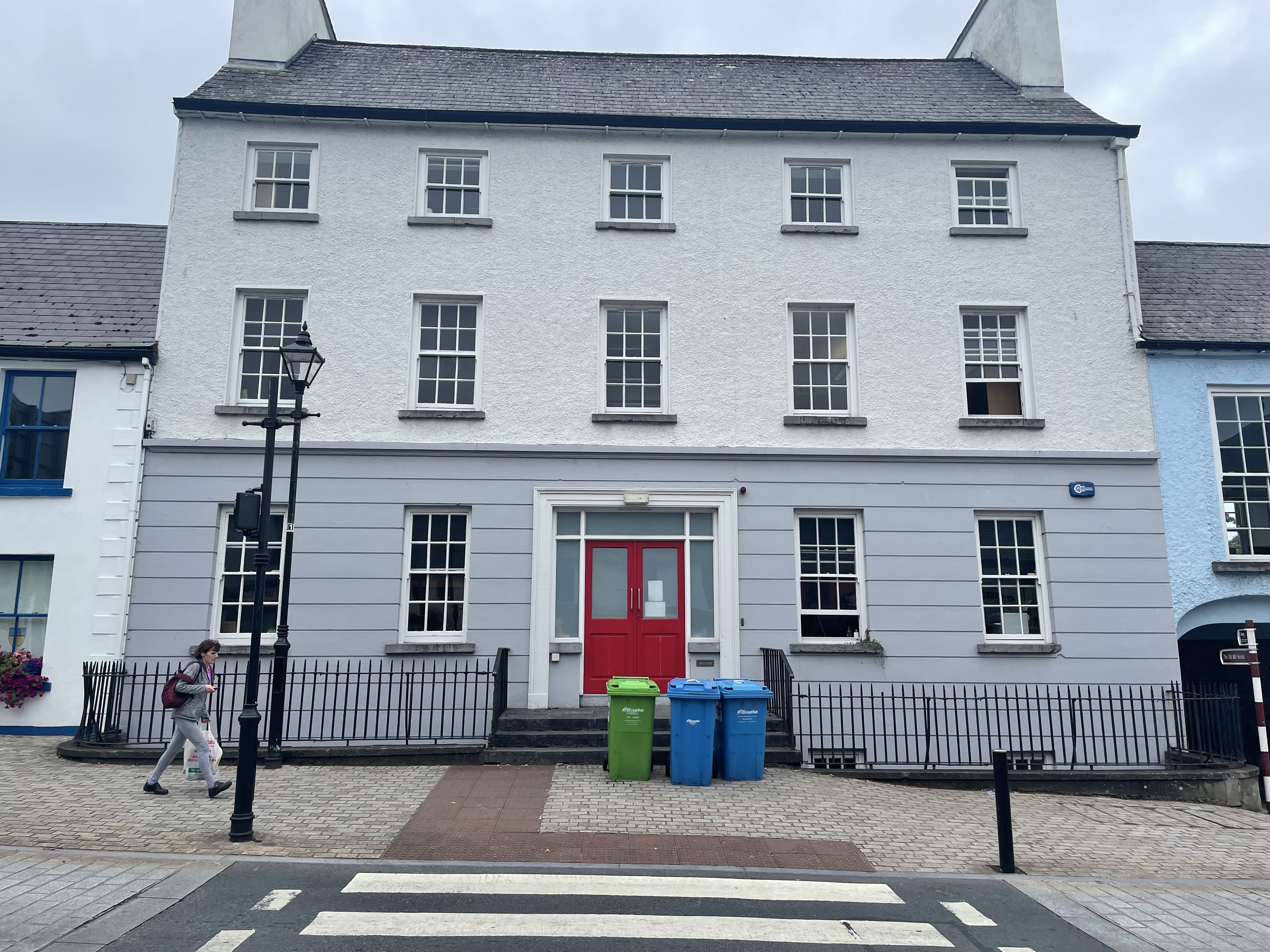
This house in Westport became the home of the 3rd Marquess of Sligo and his sisters during the Great Famine while Westport House was closed. It later served as the Westport Garda Station.

Like his predecessors, Browne prided himself on being an enlightened landlord. In the second year of the Great Irish Famine, Browne's tenants gathered at Westport House, the ancestral residence of the Marquesses of Sligo. Browne assured his tenants of his support for them, and proceeded to hand them guns (without regard for his own safety), enabling them to hunt for game. He also went into considerable debt in order to acquire cornmeal from the Americas, and converted most of Westport House into a soup kitchen for the starving peasants.

He is buried at Kensal Green Cemetery, London.

== Arms ==
Coat of arms of George Browne, 3rd Marquess of Sligo
Crest An eagle, displayed, vert. Escutcheon Sable, three lions, passant, in bend, argent, between four bendlets, of the last. Supporters Dexter, a talbot, proper, gorged with a baron’s coronet ; Sinister, a horse, argent Motto Suivez raison (Follow reason).

== Sources ==
- G. E. C., ed. Geoffrey F. White. The Complete Peerage. (London: St. Chaterine Press, 1953) Vol. XII, Part 1, p. 25–26.

Peerage of Ireland
Preceded by Howe Browne	Marquess of Sligo; 1845 – 1896	Succeeded by John Browne
