= Joe McDonnell =

Joe McDonnell may refer to:

- Joe McDonnell (hunger striker) (1951–1981), Provisional IRA hunger striker
- Joe McDonnell (rugby union) (born 1973), New Zealand rugby union player
- Joe McDonnell (ice hockey) (born 1961), Canadian ice hockey player
- Joe McDonnell (footballer) (born 1994), English football player
