= Joseph Myles McDonnell =

Irish politician

Member of Parliament for County Mayo
- In office 2 March 1846 – 14 August 1847 Serving with Robert Dillon Browne
- Preceded by: Mark Blake; Robert Dillon Browne
- Succeeded by: Robert Dillon Browne; George Henry Moore

Personal details
- Died: 1872
- Party: Repeal Association

Joseph Myles McDonnell (died 1872) was an Irish Repeal Association politician.

McDonnell was elected Repeal Association MP for County Mayo at a by-election in 1846—caused by the resignation of Mark Blake—but was defeated at the general election the next year.

Parliament of the United Kingdom
Preceded by Mark Blake; Robert Dillon Browne	Member of Parliament for County Mayo; 1846–1847; With: Robert Dillon Browne	Succeeded by Robert Dillon Browne; George Henry Moore
