= Denis Browne (politician) =

Irish politician

The Right Honourable Denis Browne PC (Ire)
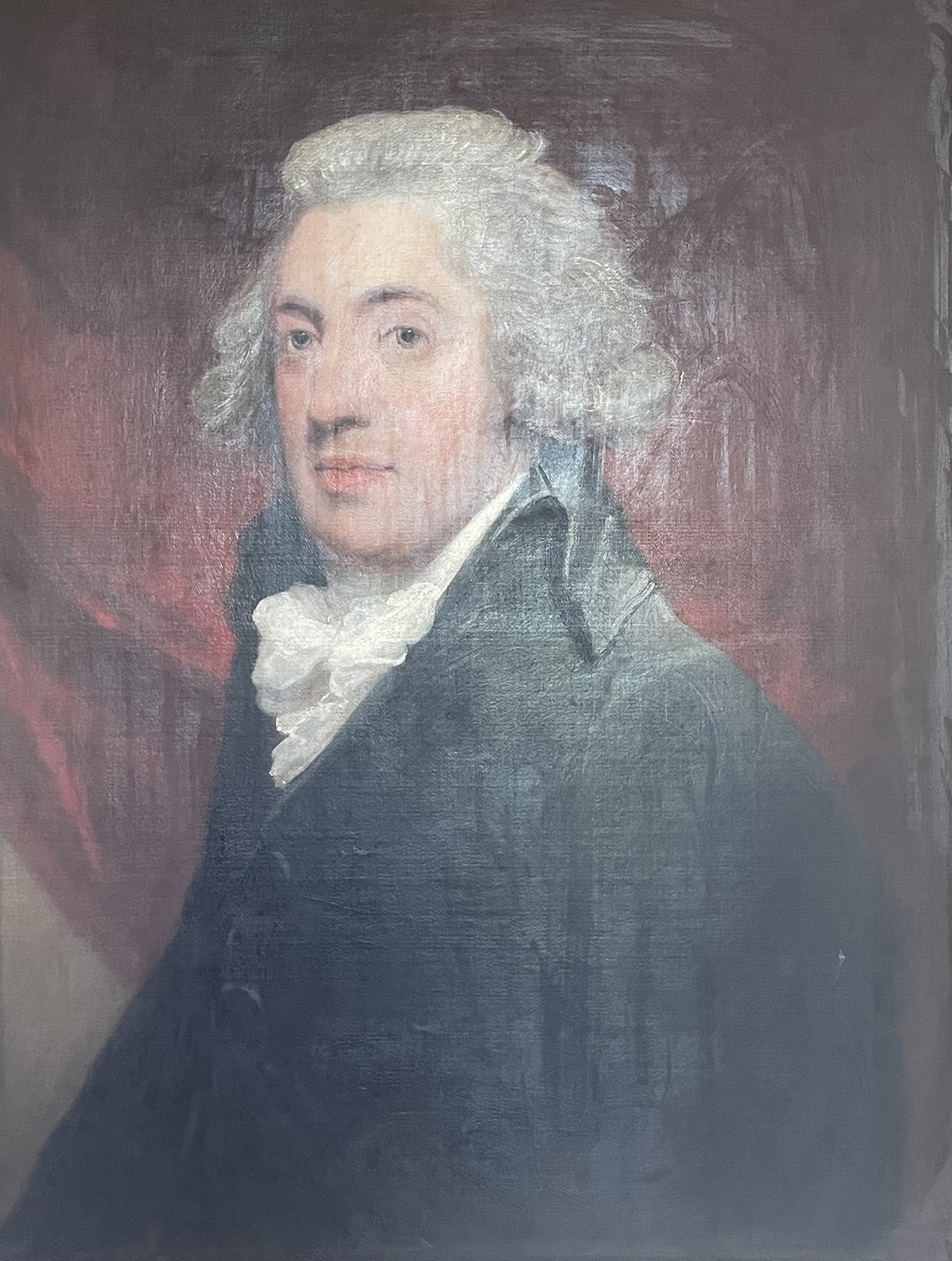

Member of the Irish House of Commons
- In office 1782–1800

Member of the House of Commons of the United Kingdom
- In office 1800–1826

Personal details
- Born: 1763
- Died: 14 August 1828 (aged 64–65)

Denis Browne (1763 – 14 August 1828) was an Irish politician, landowner and High Sheriff who was notorious for his role in punishing rebels in the 1798 rebellion.

He acquired the nickname "Denis the Rope" or "Donochadli an Rópa" in Irish. This was owing to his zeal in hanging suspected rebels, in addition to assisting in hanging his own godson.

== Life ==
Browne was the second son of two sons and four daughters born to Peter Browne, 2nd Earl of Altamont and Elizabeth Kelly of Lisduffe, County Galway. He was born and raised at the family home of Westport House, County Mayo. He was a direct descendant of the pirate, Grace O'Malley (c.1530-c.1603). The Browne Family being one of the ancient Tribes of Galway and had been originally Catholic before conversion to the Church of Ireland. Most of the family property was left to John Denis, a sum of £5000 and a life interest in the property of Mount Browne were granted to Denis Browne. Denis Browne purchased the Claremont estate from Dominic Browne of Castlemacgarrett.

Browne served as an officer in the 5th Royal Irish Dragoons from 1779 to 1784. Due to his brother's influence and the support of the Irish catholic interest, he was elected MP for County Mayo in 1782, which he would hold till 1800. His uncle, James Browne, Prime Sergeant, was dismissed in 1782 which led to the brothers going into opposition against the government. In time, they were conciliated by the Duke of Rutland's administration. Browne was appointed to the Privy council on 20 January 1794.

Browne supported Catholic emancipation but would not help the Catholic Committee in organising elections in the county; Wolfe Tone believed this was because Browne was unwilling to lose any influence in his locality. On the other hand, Browne and his brother supported the government, keeping the administration in Dublin well informed of events in Mayo in the years prior to the Irish Rebellion of 1798. In 1795 Browne and his brother Lord Altamount assisted over five hundred Ulster families who fled to Mayo in the wake of disturbances arising from the Battle of the Diamond. All the refugees were carefully questioned to root out any disaffected elements, the families settling on the family estates.

He was appointed High Sheriff of Mayo for 1798, the year of the Irish Rebellion. During this time his home in Claremorris was destroyed by the rebels.

Browne had a well-earned reputation as a feared duelist. While Sheriff, he fought against George Robert FitzGerald; another, during the election of 1790, against his electoral opponent, John Bingham. In 1801 he fought against another parliamentary opponent, won, and was returned unopposed for County Mayo.

Browne's subsequent support for the Acts of Union 1800 failed to gain him a peerage, though his brother was made first Marquess of Sligo. In the following decades he represented County Mayo (1800–1818) and Kilkenny City (1820–26), strongly supporting military coercion in Ireland.

== Public Opinion in Ireland ==
Browne was unpopular in Ireland for hanging many Irish rebels and a seeming lack of committee to support Catholic emancipation fully.

He had many nicknames including Denis of the Rope or its Irish language version Donnchadh an Rópa and Soap the Rope Browne. A poem was written about him which Douglas Hyde translated from Irish:

"If I got your hand, it is I would take it,

But not to shake it, O Denis Browne,

But to hang you high with a hempen cable,

And your feet unable to find the ground,

For it's many the boy who was strong and able,

You sent in chains with your tyrant frown;

But they’ll come again, with the French flag waving,

And the French drums raving to strike you down."

== Family ==
He married his cousin Anne Mahon (died 1833) of Castlegar, County Galway, in 1790, having five sons and four daughters. Two of his sons, James and Peter, also served in the commons from the 1820s. He was instrumental in securing the election of his cousin, Dominick Browne, 1st Baron Oranmore and Browne, supposedly encouraging him to fight a duel to gain votes (Martyn, 2001).

His godson was "Johnny the Outlaw"

He died at his home in Claremorris. A portrait of him by Sir Joshua Reynolds hangs in Westport House.

Parliament of Ireland
Preceded by James Cuffe; George Browne	Member of Parliament for County Mayo; 1782 – 1800; With: James Cuffe to 1798; George Jackson from 1798	Act of Union
Parliament of the United Kingdom
New constituency Before the Act of Union, see County Mayo	Member of Parliament for County Mayo; 1801 – 1818; With: George Jackson to 1802; Henry Dillon-Lee 1802–14; Dominick Browne	Succeeded by James Browne; Dominick Browne
Preceded by Charles Harward Butler Clarke	Member of Parliament for Kilkenny City; 1820 – 1826	Succeeded by John Doherty
