= Thomas Tighe (MP) =

Thomas Tighe MP

Member of Parliament for County Mayo
- In office 31 January 1874 – 7 May 1874 Serving with George Eakins Browne
- Preceded by: George Eakins Browne; George Bingham
- Succeeded by: John O'Connor Power; George Eakins Browne

Personal details
- Born: 1829
- Died: 15 June 1914 (aged 84)
- Party: Home Rule

Thomas Tighe (1829–15 June 1914) was an Irish Home Rule League politician.

He was elected as Member of Parliament (MP) for County Mayo at the 1874 general election but was shortly after unseated. At the resulting by-election, he failed to regain the seat.

He was High Sheriff of Mayo in 1879.

Parliament of the United Kingdom
Preceded by George Eakins Browne; George Bingham	Member of Parliament for County Mayo; February 1874 – May 1874; With: George Eakins Browne	Succeeded by John O'Connor Power; George Eakins Browne
