= County Mayo (UK Parliament constituency) =

UK parliamentary constituency in Ireland, 1801–1885

- Former county constituency for the House of Commons
- County: County Mayo

1801–1885
- Seats: 2
- Created from: County Mayo (IHC)
- Replaced by: East Mayo; North Mayo; South Mayo; West Mayo

County Mayo was a parliamentary constituency in Ireland, which returned two Members of Parliament (MPs) to the House of Commons of the Parliament of the United Kingdom from 1801 to 1885.

== History ==
The constituency was created in 1801 under the Acts of Union 1800, succeeding the earlier County Mayo constituency in the pre-union Parliament of Ireland. Under the Redistribution of Seats Act 1885 it was divided into four new single-seat constituencies: East Mayo, North Mayo, South Mayo and West Mayo.

== Boundaries ==
This constituency comprised the whole of County Mayo.

== Members of Parliament ==
Year	1st Member	1st Party	2nd Member	2nd Party
1801, 1 January	Denis Browne		George Jackson	
1802, 22 July	Denis Browne		Henry Dillon-Lee	
1814, 5 March	Denis Browne		Dominick Browne	Whig
1818, 4 July	James Browne	Tory	Dominick Browne	Whig
1826, 24 June	James Browne	Tory	Lord Bingham	Non Partisan
1830, 14 August	James Browne	Tory	Dominick Browne	Whig
1831, 19 May	John Denis Browne	Whig	Dominick Browne	Whig
1835, 24 January	Sir William Brabazon, Bt	Repeal Association	Dominick Browne	Whig
1836, 6 May	Sir William Brabazon, Bt	Repeal Association	Robert Dillon Browne	Repeal Association
1840, 16 December	Mark Blake	Repeal Association	Robert Dillon Browne	Repeal Association
1846, 2 March	Joseph Myles McDonnell	Repeal Association	Robert Dillon Browne	Repeal Association
1847, 14 August	George Henry Moore	Whig	Robert Dillon Browne	Repeal Association
1850, 29 July	George Henry Moore	Whig	George Gore Ousley Higgins	Whig
1852, 26 July	George Henry Moore	Independent Irish	George Gore Ousley Higgins	Independent Irish
1857, 10 April	George Henry Moore	Independent Irish	Roger Palmer	Conservative
1857, 30 December	Lord John Browne	Whig	Roger Palmer	Conservative
1859, 13 May	Lord John Browne	Liberal	Roger Palmer	Conservative
1865, 19 July	Lord John Browne	Liberal	Lord Bingham	Conservative
1868, 23 November	George Henry Moore	Liberal	Lord Bingham	Conservative
1870, 12 May	George Eakins Browne	Liberal	Lord Bingham	Conservative
1874, 7 Feb	George Eakins Browne	Home Rule League	Thomas Tighe	Home Rule League
1874, 1 June	George Eakins Browne	Home Rule League	John O'Connor Power	Home Rule League
1880, 15 April	Charles Stewart Parnell	Parnellite Home Rule League	John O'Connor Power	Home Rule League
1880, 26 May	Isaac Nelson	Home Rule League	John O'Connor Power	Home Rule League
1882	Isaac Nelson	Irish Parliamentary Party	John O'Connor Power	Irish Parliamentary Party
1885	Constituency divided: see East Mayo, North Mayo, South Mayo and West Mayo			

== Elections ==
The elections in this constituency took place using the first past the post electoral system.

=== Elections in the 1830s ===
General Election 1830: Mayo
Party	Candidate	Votes	%
Tory	James Browne	402	40.4
Whig	Dominick Browne	376	37.8
Whig	Joseph Myles McDonnell	217	21.8
Nonpartisan	George Vaughan Jackson	1	0.1
Turnout		624	59.1
Registered electors		1,055	
Majority		26	2.6
Tory hold			
Majority		159	16.0
Whig gain from Nonpartisan			

General Election 1831: Mayo
Party	Candidate	Votes	%	±%
Whig	John Denis Browne	469	43.0	N/A
Whig	Dominick Browne	415	38.1	+0.3
Whig	Joseph Myles McDonnell	206	18.9	−2.9
Majority		209	19.2	+3.2
Turnout		c. 545	c. 51.7	c. −7.4
Registered electors		1,055		
Whig hold		Swing	N/A	
Whig gain from Tory		Swing	+0.3	

General Election 1832: Mayo
Party	Candidate	Votes	%	±%
Whig	John Denis Browne	666	35.0	−8.0
Whig	Dominick Browne	628	33.0	−5.1
Repeal	William Brabazon	611	32.1	New
Majority		17	0.9	−18.3
Turnout		1,234	91.4	c. +39.7
Registered electors		1,350		
Whig hold		Swing	−8.0	
Whig hold		Swing	−5.1	

General Election 1835: Mayo
Party	Candidate	Votes	%	±%
Repeal (Whig)	William Brabazon	828	42.6	+14.5
Whig	Dominick Browne	623	32.1	−0.9
Whig	John Denis Browne	430	22.1	−12.9
Conservative	John D Ellard	62	3.2	New
Turnout		c. 972	c. 75.3	c. −16.1
Registered electors		1,290		
Majority		398	20.5	N/A
Repeal gain from Whig		Swing	+10.5	
Majority		193	10.0	+9.1
Whig hold		Swing	−4.1	

Browne was elevated to the peerage, becoming 1st Baron Oranmore and causing a by-election.

By-election, 6 May 1836: Mayo
Party	Candidate	Votes	%	±%
Repeal (Whig)	Robert Dillon Browne	599	66.3	+23.7
Whig	John Denis Browne	305	33.7	−20.5
Majority		294	32.4	N/A
Turnout		904	60.6	c. −14.7
Registered electors		1,491		
Repeal gain from Whig		Swing	+22.1	

- Note (1836): Walker suggests 609 votes were placed for Robert Browne, and none for John Browne, but Stooks Smith's figures have been used above.

General Election 1837: Mayo
Party	Candidate	Votes	%
Repeal (Whig)	William Brabazon	Unopposed	
Repeal (Whig)	Robert Dillon Browne	Unopposed	
Registered electors		2,028	
Repeal hold			
Repeal gain from Whig			

=== Elections in the 1840s ===
Brabazon's death caused a by-election.

By-election, 16 December 1840: Mayo
Party	Candidate	Votes	%	±%
Repeal	Mark Blake	Unopposed		
Repeal hold				

General election 1841: Mayo
Party	Candidate	Votes	%	±%
Repeal	Mark Blake	Unopposed		
Repeal	Robert Dillon Browne	Unopposed		
Registered electors		1,064		
Repeal hold				
Repeal hold				

Blake resigned by accepting the office of Steward of the Chiltern Hundreds, causing a by-election.

By-election, 2 March 1846: Mayo
Party	Candidate	Votes	%	±%
Repeal	Joseph Myles McDonnell	477	53.4	N/A
Whig	George Henry Moore	417	46.6	New
Majority		60	6.8	N/A
Turnout		894	57.6	N/A
Registered electors		1,551 (1847 figure)		
Repeal hold		Swing	N/A	

General Election 1847: Mayo
Party	Candidate	Votes	%	±%
Whig	George Henry Moore	504	61.3	N/A
Repeal	Robert Dillon Browne	254	30.9	N/A
Repeal	Joseph Myles McDonnell	53	6.4	N/A
Repeal	John Denis Browne	11	1.3	N/A
Majority		451	54.9	N/A
Turnout		411 (est)	26.5 (est)	N/A
Registered electors		1,551		
Whig gain from Repeal		Swing	N/A	
Repeal hold		Swing	N/A	

=== Elections in the 1850s ===
Browne's death caused a by-election.

By-election, 29 July 1850: Mayo
Party	Candidate	Votes	%	±%
Whig	George Gore Ousley Higgins	141	60.3	−1.0
Conservative	Isaac Butt	93	39.7	New
Majority		48	20.6	N/A
Turnout		234	15.1	−11.4
Registered electors		1,551		
Whig gain from Repeal		Swing		

General election 1852: Mayo
Party	Candidate	Votes	%	±%
Independent Irish	George Henry Moore	692	40.7	−20.6
Independent Irish	George Gore Ousley Higgins	649	38.2	N/A
Conservative	James McAlpine	360	21.2	N/A
Majority		289	17.0	N/A
Turnout		960 (est)	68.8 (est)	+42.3
Registered electors		1,395		
Independent Irish gain from Whig		Swing	N/A	
Independent Irish gain from Repeal		Swing	N/A	

General election 1857: Mayo
Party	Candidate	Votes	%	±%
Conservative	Roger Palmer	1,225	35.9	+14.7
Independent Irish	George Henry Moore	1,150	33.7	−7.0
Whig	George Gore Ousley Higgins	1,037	30.4	−7.8
Turnout		1,706 (est)	73.0 (est)	+4.2
Registered electors		2,338		
Majority		75	2.2	N/A
Conservative gain from Independent Irish		Swing	+14.8	
Majority		113	3.3	−13.7
Independent Irish hold		Swing	−7.2	

On petition, Moore was unseated, causing a by-election.

By-election, 30 December 1857: Mayo
Party	Candidate	Votes	%	±%
Whig	John Browne	Unopposed		
Whig gain from Independent Irish				

General election 1859: Mayo
Party	Candidate	Votes	%	±%
Liberal	John Browne	Unopposed		
Conservative	Roger Palmer	Unopposed		
Registered electors		3,779		
Liberal hold				
Conservative hold				

=== Elections in the 1860s ===
General election 1865: Mayo
Party	Candidate	Votes	%	±%
Liberal	John Browne	Unopposed		
Conservative	George Bingham	Unopposed		
Registered electors		3,679		
Liberal hold				
Conservative hold				

General election 1868: Mayo
Party	Candidate	Votes	%	±%
Liberal	George Henry Moore	Unopposed		
Conservative	George Bingham	Unopposed		
Registered electors		3,783		
Liberal hold				
Conservative hold				

=== Elections in the 1870s ===
Moore's death caused a by-election.

By-election, 12 May 1870: Mayo
Party	Candidate	Votes	%	±%
Liberal	George Eakins Browne	Unopposed		
Liberal hold				

General election 1874: Mayo
Party	Candidate	Votes	%	±%
Home Rule	George Eakins Browne	Unopposed		
Home Rule	Thomas Tighe	Unopposed		
Registered electors		3,608		
Home Rule gain from Conservative				
Home Rule gain from Liberal				

On petition, Browne and Tighe were unseated.

By-election, 29 May 1874: Mayo
Party	Candidate	Votes	%	±%
Home Rule	George Eakins Browne	1,330	33.9	N/A
Home Rule	John O'Connor Power	1,319	33.6	N/A
Home Rule	Thomas Tighe	1,279	32.6	N/A
Majority		40	1.0	N/A
Turnout		1,964 (est)	54.4 (est)	N/A
Registered electors		3,608		
Home Rule hold				
Home Rule hold				

=== Elections in the 1880s ===
General election 1880: Mayo
Party	Candidate	Votes	%	±%
Home Rule	John O'Connor Power	1,645	42.9	N/A
Home Rule	Charles Stewart Parnell	1,565	40.8	N/A
Home Rule	George Eakins Browne	628	16.4	N/A
Majority		937	24.4	N/A
Turnout		2,273 (est)	70.6 (est)	N/A
Registered electors		3,221		
Home Rule hold		Swing	N/A	
Home Rule hold		Swing	N/A	

Parnell was also elected MP for Cork City and opted to sit there, causing a by-election.

By-election, 25 May 1880: Mayo
Party	Candidate	Votes	%	±%
Home Rule	Isaac Nelson	Unopposed		
Registered electors		3,221		
Home Rule hold				
