= George Eakins Browne =

George Eakins Browne (1837-20 February 1923) was an Irish politician.

He was born in 1837 to John Joseph Browne and Maria Eakins, of Brownstown, Ballinrobe, County Mayo. The family estate amounted to some 2,809 acres during Griffith's Valuation in the 1840s.

He was elected in 1870 as a Member of Parliament for County Mayo, and was re-elected at the 1874 general election. The election was declared void on 7 May 1874, but Browne was re-elected at the resulting by-election, and held the seat until the 1880 general election, when he was defeated by Charles Stewart Parnell.

During the Parnell Commission, he was referred to as "one of the three good landlords in Ireland".

He later moved to County Dublin and was, for a time, a member of Killiney Urban District Council. On his death, he lived at 14 Shanganagh Terrace, Killiney.

The Irish Times wrote that he was the last of the generation of Issac Butt's Home Rule Party: "At the time of his death, he was the last survivor of that group of public men, which included William Archer Redmond, father of the late John Redmond, and Joseph Biggar."

Browne was married three times: In 1858, he married Julia Blake (d. 1876), daughter of Maurice Blake of Ballinafad, Drum, County Mayo. After her death, he married, in 1879, Julia Mary Lynch, daughter of James Lynch, and in 1883, Honoria Ellen Murphy, daughter of Francis Murphy JP of Kilcairne, Killucan, County Meath.

He had four daughters and a son, Major Llewellyn Montague Browne of the Royal Dublin Fusiliers.

Parliament of the United Kingdom
Preceded by Charles Bingham, Lord Bingham; George Henry Moore	Member of Parliament for County Mayo; 1870 – 1880; With: Charles Bingham, Lord Bingham 1870–1874; Thomas Tighe 1874; John O'Connor Power 1874–1880	Succeeded by John O'Connor Power; Charles Stewart Parnell
