= Dennis Kelly (judge) =

Jamaican judge and planter

Dennis Kelly (d. 1757) was a Jamaican judge and planter who served as the chief justice of Jamaica from 1742 to 1746.

== Background ==
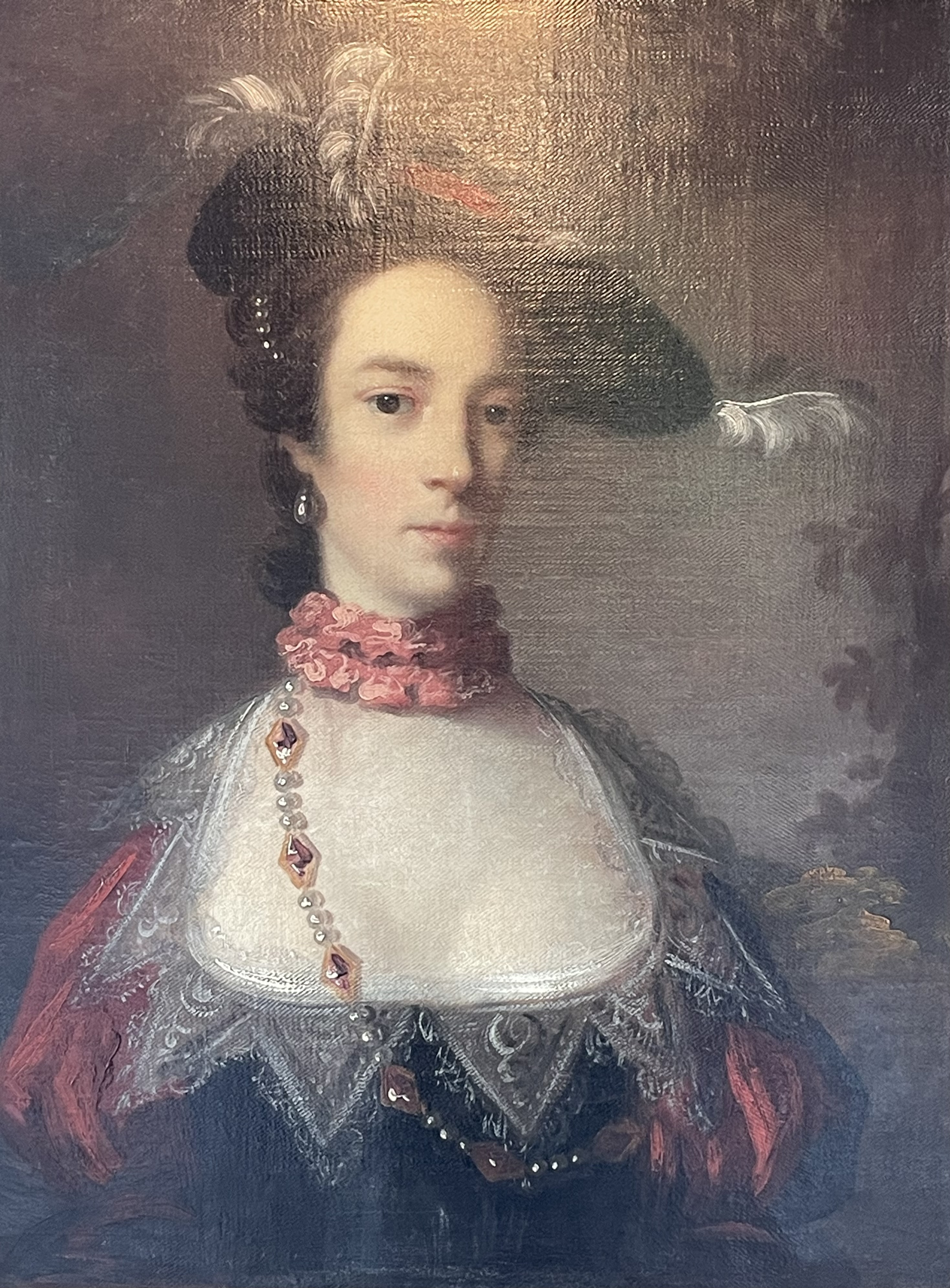
A portrait of his daughter Elizabeth

His father, also named Denis Kelly, was an Irish-born barrister who immigrated to the English colony of Jamaica at the end of the 17th century. The elder Denis Kelly married Elizabeth Meade from County Cork and they had seven sons and three daughters. He purchased 621 acres of land west of Old Harbour Bay which became Kelly's Estate. He returned to Ireland in 1716 to live on lands in Lisduff, County Galway bought by his oldest son, Edmond. Edmond acquired further estates in Jamaica and served as Attorney General and Speaker. He had financial problems and left Jamaica and died in London in 1728.

== Wealth and family ==
Denis Kelly was Edmond's younger brother and secured what remained of his brother's estate. He married Priscilla Halstead in 1729, an heiress to estates in the island. They had one daughter Elizabeth, born in 1732. On the death of his wife in 1747 Kelly moved to the family estates in Lisduff. In 1752, Elizabeth married Peter Browne, 2nd Earl of Altamont. Denis Kelly's illegitimate daughter, Priscilla Kelly, married Robert Cooper Lee, Crown Solicitor-General of Jamaica, and Barrister of London, England. Their heiress daughter, Favell Bourke Lee, married David Bevan, British banker of Barclay, Bevan, Bennin, Tritton (forerunners of Barclays).

== See also ==
- History of Jamaica
