= Sir Roger Palmer, 5th Baronet =

Anglo-Irish politician and British military officer

Lieutenant-General Sir Roger Palmer Bt
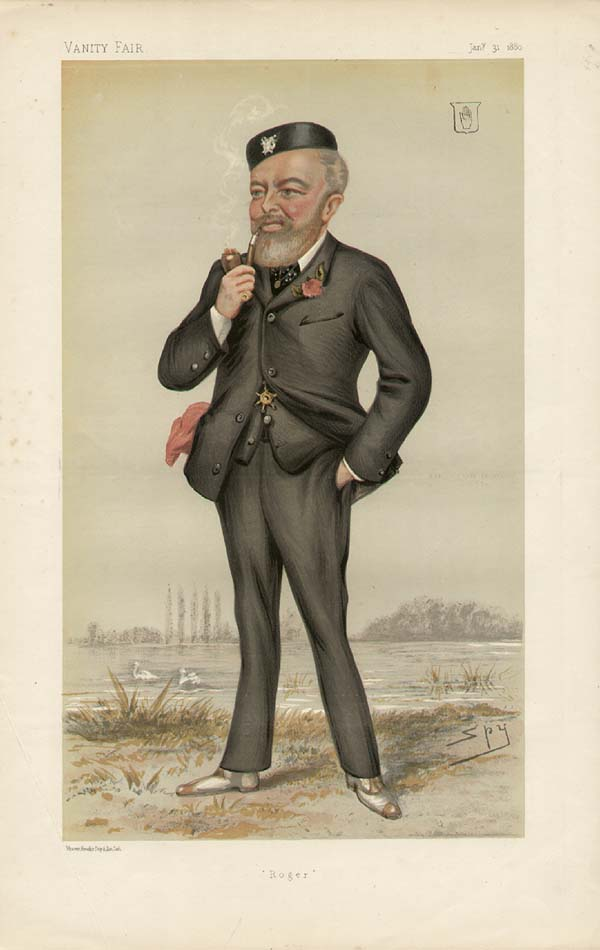
- Caricature by Spy in Vanity Fair, 1880
- Born: William Henry Palmer; 22 May 1832
- Died: 30 May 1910 (aged 78)

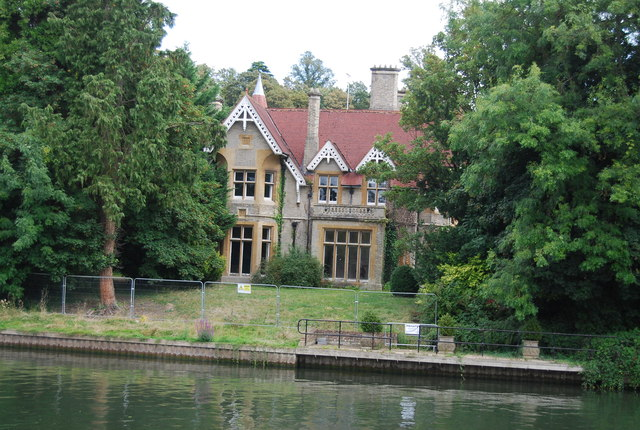
Glen Island House, Taplow

Lieutenant-General Sir Roger William Henry Palmer, 5th Baronet (22 May 1832 – 30 May 1910) was a senior officer in the British Army and the Anglo-Irish Conservative MP for County Mayo. Sir Roger was the last of the Palmer baronets of Castle Lackin, Co. Mayo, who owned, in addition to some 115,000 acres of land, Kenure House, Rush, County Dublin, Castle Lackin in Mayo, Cefn Park in Wrexham and Glenisland House in Maidenhead. He inherited the estates on the death in 1832 of Mrs Palmer, the wife of Joseph Palmer and the daughter of Francis Palmer of Palmerstown, Co. Mayo, and Elizabeth Echlin.

He was the son of Sir William Henry Roger Palmer, Bt and the great-grandson of Sir Roger Palmer of Mayo, who was MP (1768–1783) for Portarlington in the Irish Parliament. His only sibling Ellen married Archie Peel, a nephew of the UK Prime minister. He was educated at Eton and joined the Army.

He served in the Crimea War with the 11th Hussars and took part in the Charge of the Light Brigade of 1854. He exchanged to the 2nd Life Guards in 1856 (until 1870) and was placed on the retired list in 1881. He was granted the colonelcy of the 20th Hussars from 1891 until his death in 1910.

During the Irish Famine, he was known to have evicted many tenants.

He was the Anglo-Irish Conservative MP for County Mayo from 1857 until 1865. He succeeded his father in 1869 and the same year built Glen Island House on an island in the Thames near Taplow. He was High Sheriff of Mayo in 1888.

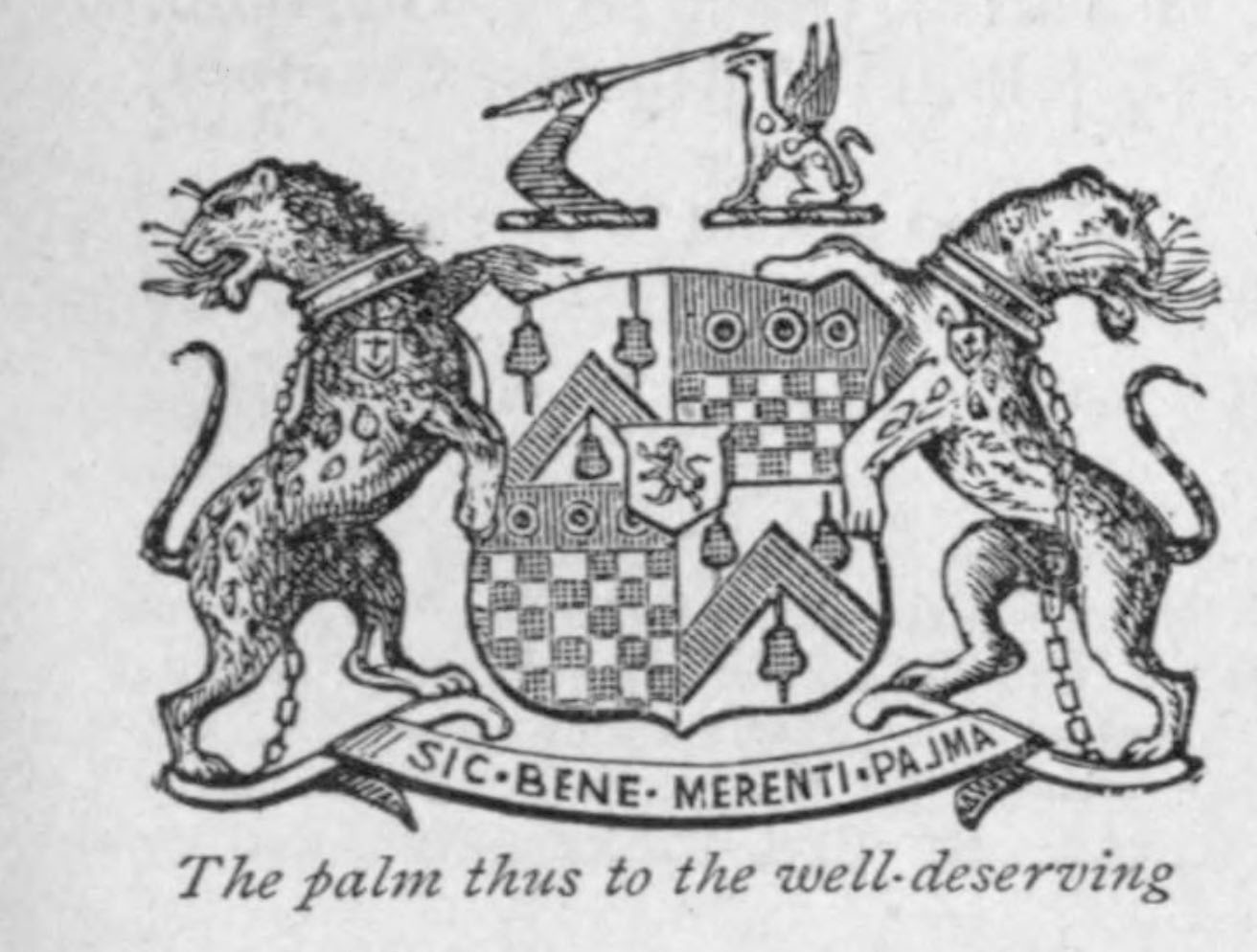
Palmer family crest

On his death, Kenure Park passed to Colonel Roderick Henry Fenwick-Palmer. Sir Roger had married Gertrude Millicent, daughter of the Rev. Plumer Rooper, who survived him, dying in 1929.

== In popular culture ==
In a 2014 episode of Who Do You Think You Are? actress Julie Walters learns that her Irish great-grandfather, Anthony Clarke, was a tenant at will of Palmer's, living on and cultivating 43 acres of land in County Mayo owned by Sir Roger.

Baronetage of Ireland
Preceded by William Palmer	Baronet (of Castle Lackin); 1869–1910	Extinct
