= Ballina, County Mayo =

Town in County Mayo, Ireland

Ballina Béal an Átha
- Town
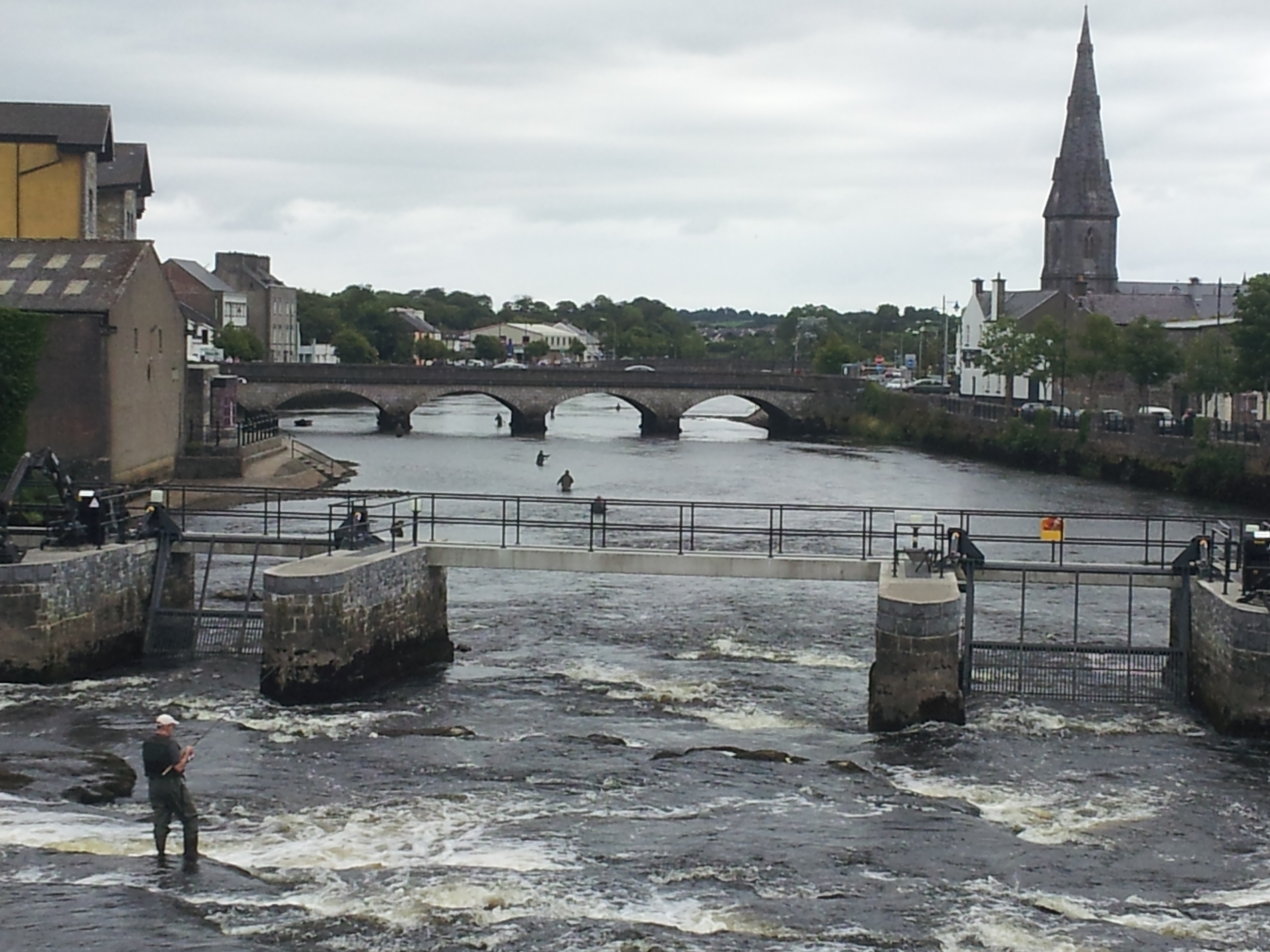
- River Moy, Ballina

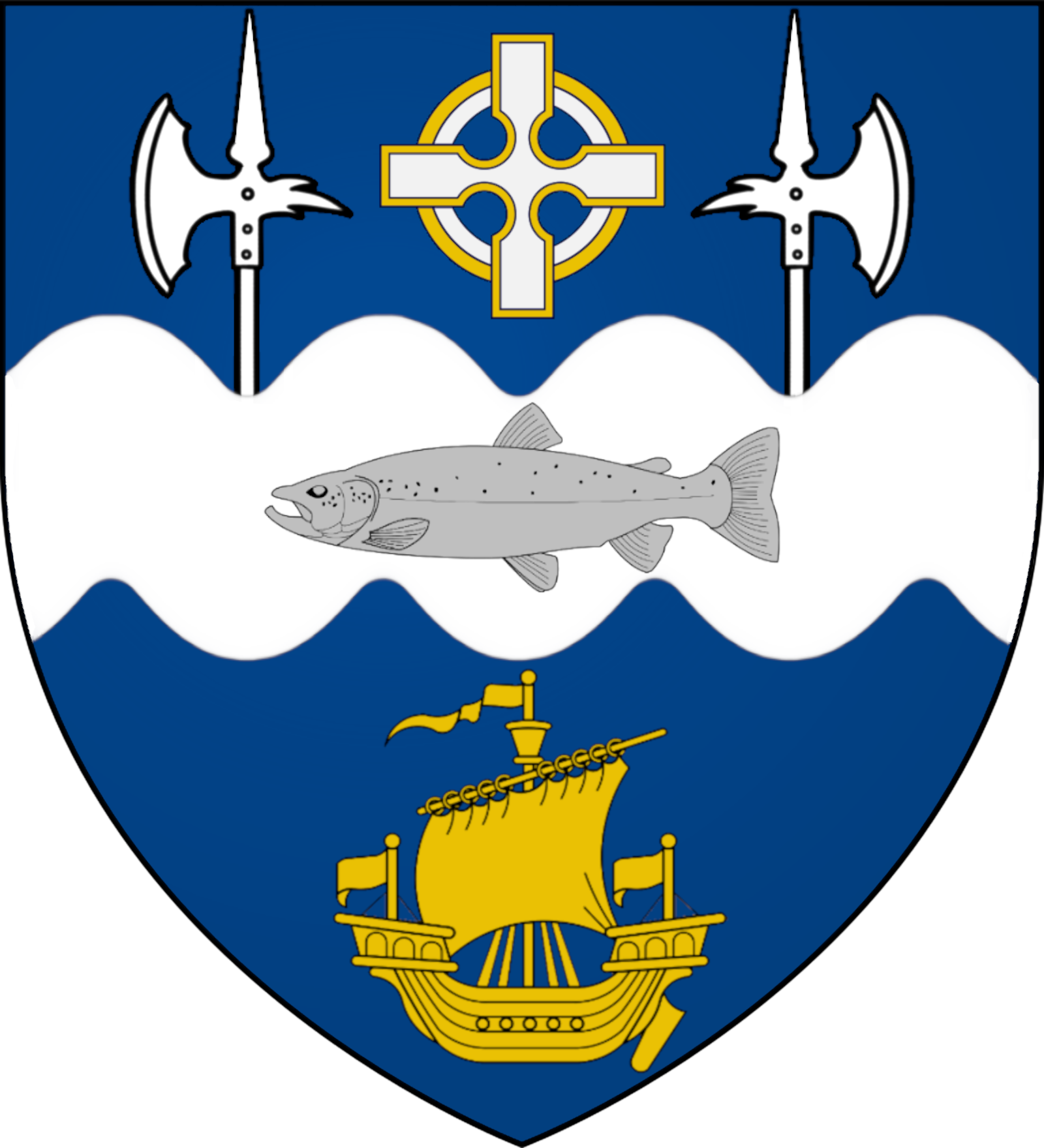
- Coat of arms

- Location in Ireland
- Coordinates: 54.1167°N 9.1667°W
- Country: Ireland
- Province: Connacht
- County: County Mayo
- Elevation: 7 m (23 ft)

Population (2022)
  - Total: 10,556
- Time zone: UTC±0 (WET)
  - Summer (DST): UTC+1 (IST)
- Eircode routing key: F26
- Telephone area code: +353(0)96
- Irish Grid Reference: G240192

Ballina (/ˌbæləˈnɑː/ bal-ə-NA; Irish: Béal an Átha, meaning 'mouth of the ford') is a town in north County Mayo, Ireland. It lies at the mouth of the River Moy near Killala Bay, in the Moy valley and civil parish of Kilmoremoy, with the Ox Mountains to the east and the Nephin Mountains to the west. The town occupies two baronies; Tirawley on the west bank of the River Moy, and Tireragh, a barony within County Sligo, on its east banks. At the 2022 census, the population of Ballina was 10,556.

== History ==
=== Pre-history ===
The Dolmen of the Four Maols is located on 'Primrose Hill' behind Ballina railway station. This Bronze Age cist is sometimes dated to ca. 2,000 BCE and is locally known as the 'Table of the Giants'. Legend suggests that the megalithic tomb is the burial place of the 'Four Maols' (from the Irish word maol meaning "bald") — four brothers who murdered Ceallach, a 7th-century bishop of Kilmoremoy. Hanged at Ardnaree, the "hill of executions", tradition says that their bodies were buried under the dolmen. The structure is approximately 5 feet high with three upright stones supporting the capstone. Nearby is a fourth supporting stone.

=== Medieval period ===
According to Encyclopædia Britannica, the first signs of settlement on the site of the town date from around 1375, when an Augustinian friary was founded. Belleek, now part of the town, predates the town's formation, and can be dated back to the 16th century. Ballina was founded as a garrison town in 1723 by O'Hara, Lord Tyrawley.

=== Belleek ===
The lands at Belleek, along with the ecclesiastical settlements at Rosserk, Strade, Moyne and Rathfran, were purchased by Charles O'Hara, 1st Baron Tyrawley on 17 March 1704/5 from the trustees overseeing the sale of various Irish estates belonging to the recently deceased Charles Boyle, 2nd Earl of Burlington and 3rd Earl of Cork.

The Belleek demesne once stretched for over three kilometres along the left bank of the Moy estuary, from the gate lodge on Castle Road as far as Knockatinnole Wood in the north. From here, the demesne extended westward to the Killala Road, where there was a secondary entrance at a place known as "The Black Woods". During the Irish Rebellion of 1798, a small column of French soldiers advanced through the estate, as part of a reconnaissance group. This gave title to the avenue known as "The Old French Road".

Most of the land of the Barons Tyrawley was let on long leases or for lives 'renewable forever' to the Knox and Gore families. The manor house of the estate, Belleek Manor (formerly known as Belleek Abbey, now the Belleek Castle Hotel and Museum), was constructed between 1825 and 1831 for Sir Francis Knox-Gore, 1st Baronet, a former Lord Lieutenant of Sligo, with designs attributed to the Irish architect John Benjamin Keane or possibly Frederick Darley Junior. Belleek and some of the original demesne lands remained within the ownership of the Knox-Gore family descendants until the early 1940s, when it was sold by Col. William Arthur Cecil Saunders-Knox-Gore D.S.O. (1888–1975) to Isaac Beckett and Co. Ltd., Ballina, who later sold the property to the Mayo County Council in the 1950s. The Doran family acquired the Belleek Manor, adapting it into a hotel. The Belleek Woods remain public, under the management of Coillte and the Belleek Woods Enhancement Group, and its 200 acres of forest make it one of Europe's largest urban woodlands.

=== Ardnaree ===
Ardnaree, also known as Shanaghy (Seanachaidh), is a townland to the east of the town. Formerly a separate village, Ardnaree has been considered a suburb of Ballina since at least the 19th century. The River Moy forms the traditional border between County Mayo and County Sligo. However, the Local Government (Ireland) Act 1898 made the right (east) bank of the Moy, including Ardnaree and Crockets Town (the Quay), part of the administrative county of Mayo. The Battle of Ardnaree was fought there in 1586 and Ardnaree Sarsfields GFC is based there.

=== 18th and 19th centuries ===
==== 1798 rebellion ====
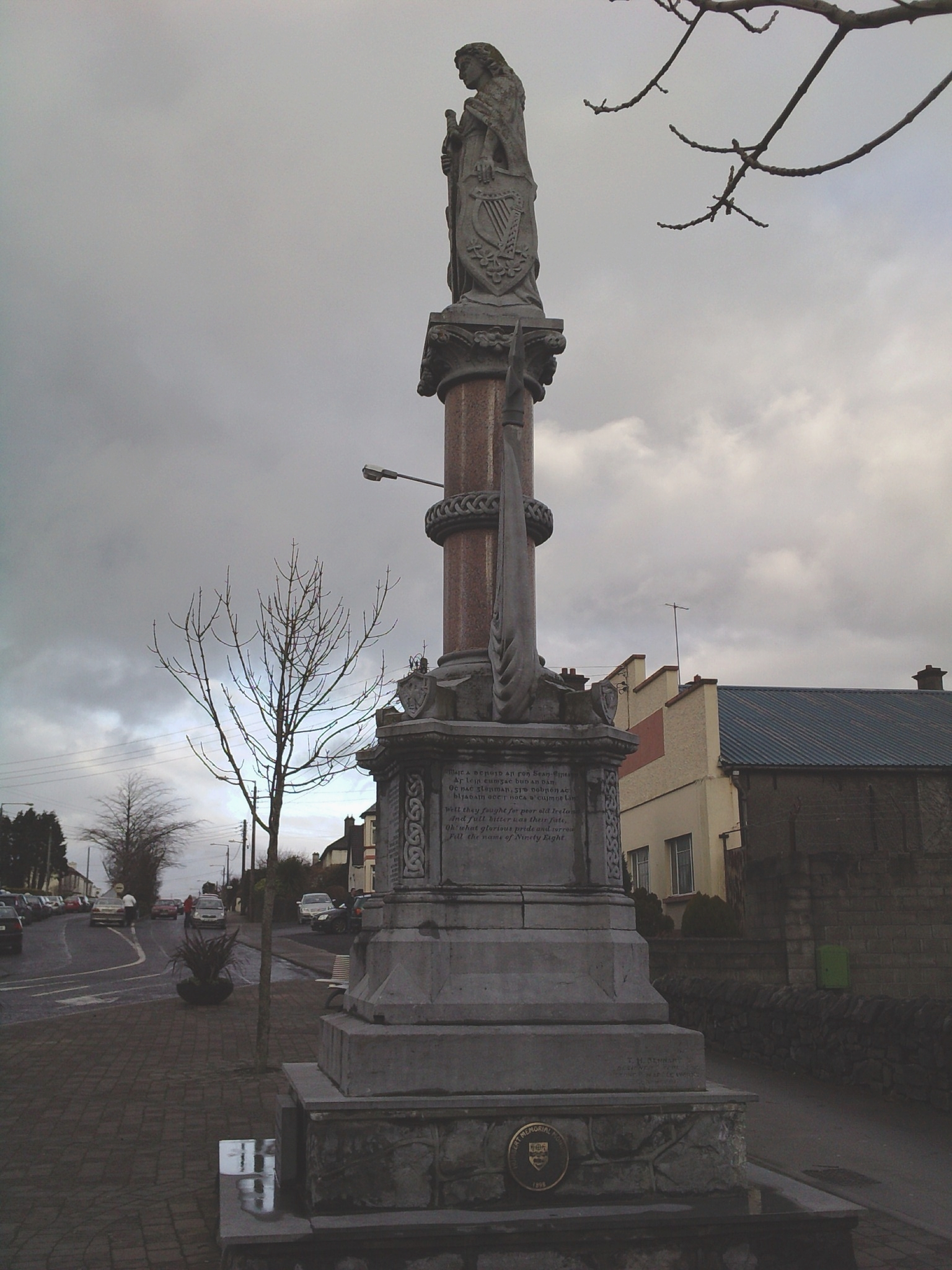
Humbert Monument on Humbert Street in Ballina

The Humbert Memorial Monument was unveiled in Ballina in 1898 by Maud Gonne MacBride for the centennial commemoration of the 1798 landing of French expeditionary forces at Killala Bay led by revolutionary General Jean Joseph Amable Humbert. The monument commemorates the military triumph over the English garrison at Ballina by a joint Franco-Irish army composed of French soldiers and Irish rebels under the command of General Humbert during the 1798 rebellion of the Society of United Irishmen. Sculpted by Thomas H. Dennany of Monumental Marble Works in Glasnevin, the monument is topped by a statue depicting the 'Maid of Erin' or 'Mother Ireland', with a sword in hand and an Irish Wolfhound by her side. The monument was commissioned and "erected by the voluntary subscriptions of the priests and people of Mayo and Sligo". The monument was moved to its current location on Humbert Street in 1987, where it was re-dedicated by Maud Gonne's son, Seán MacBride.

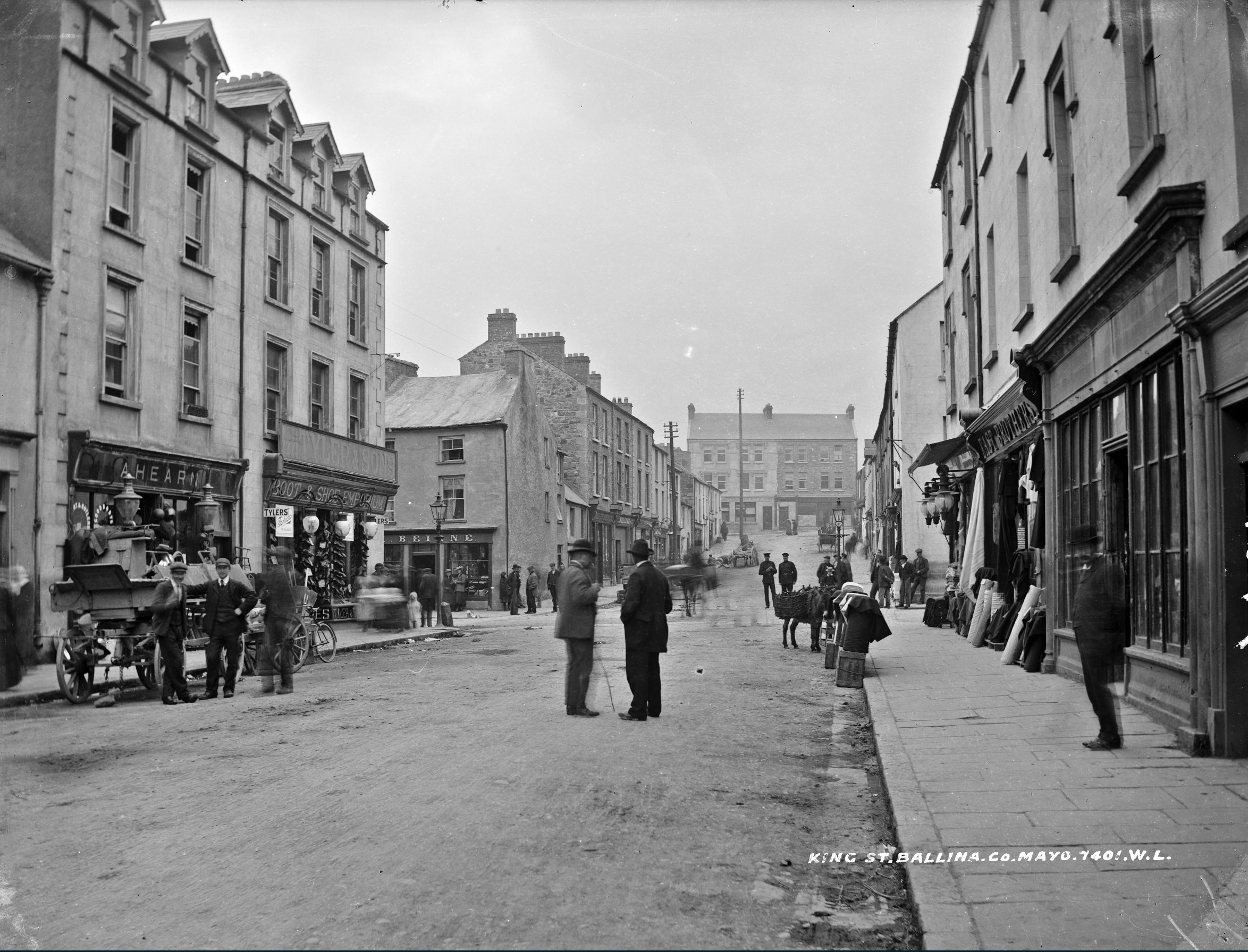
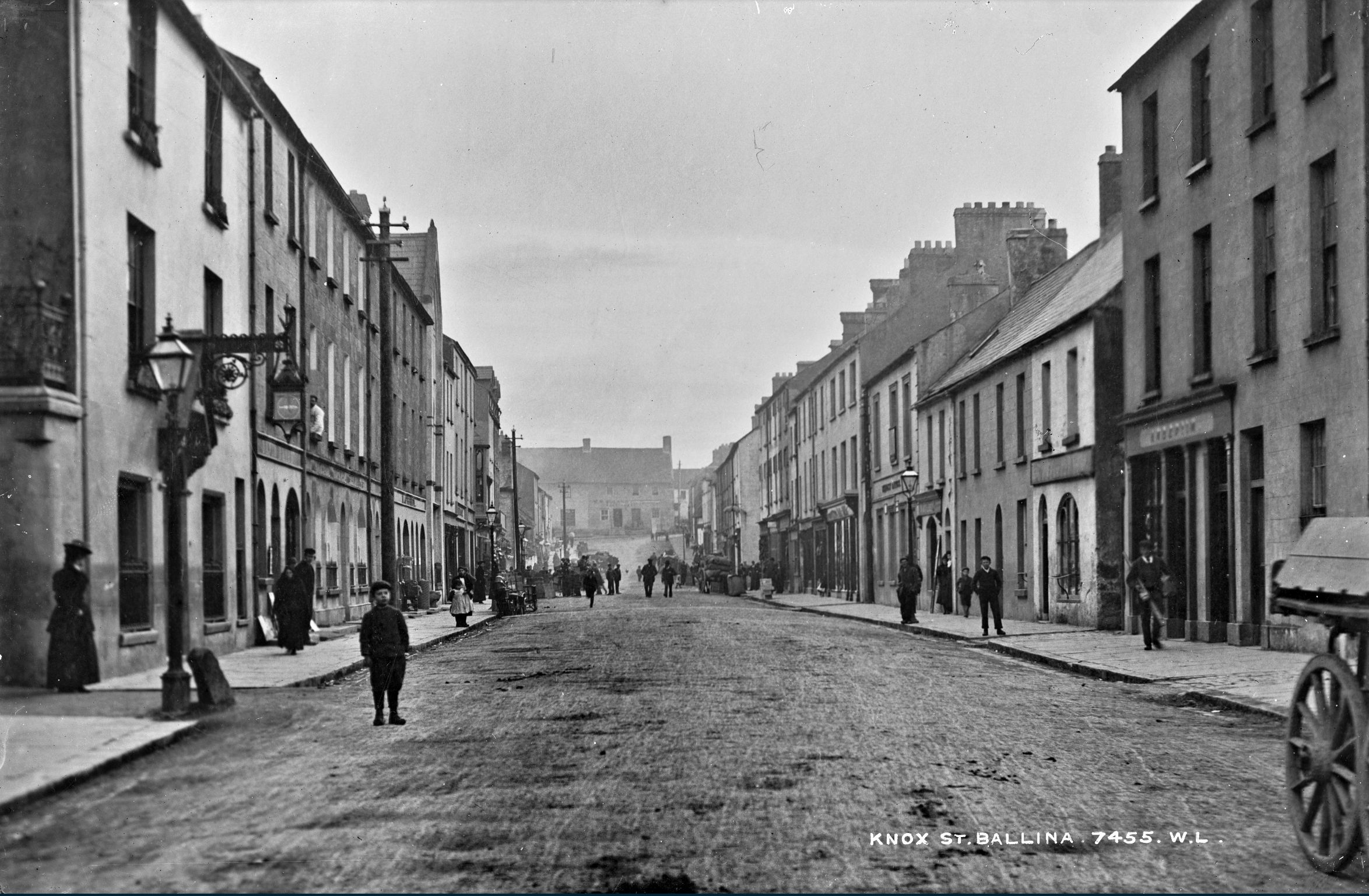
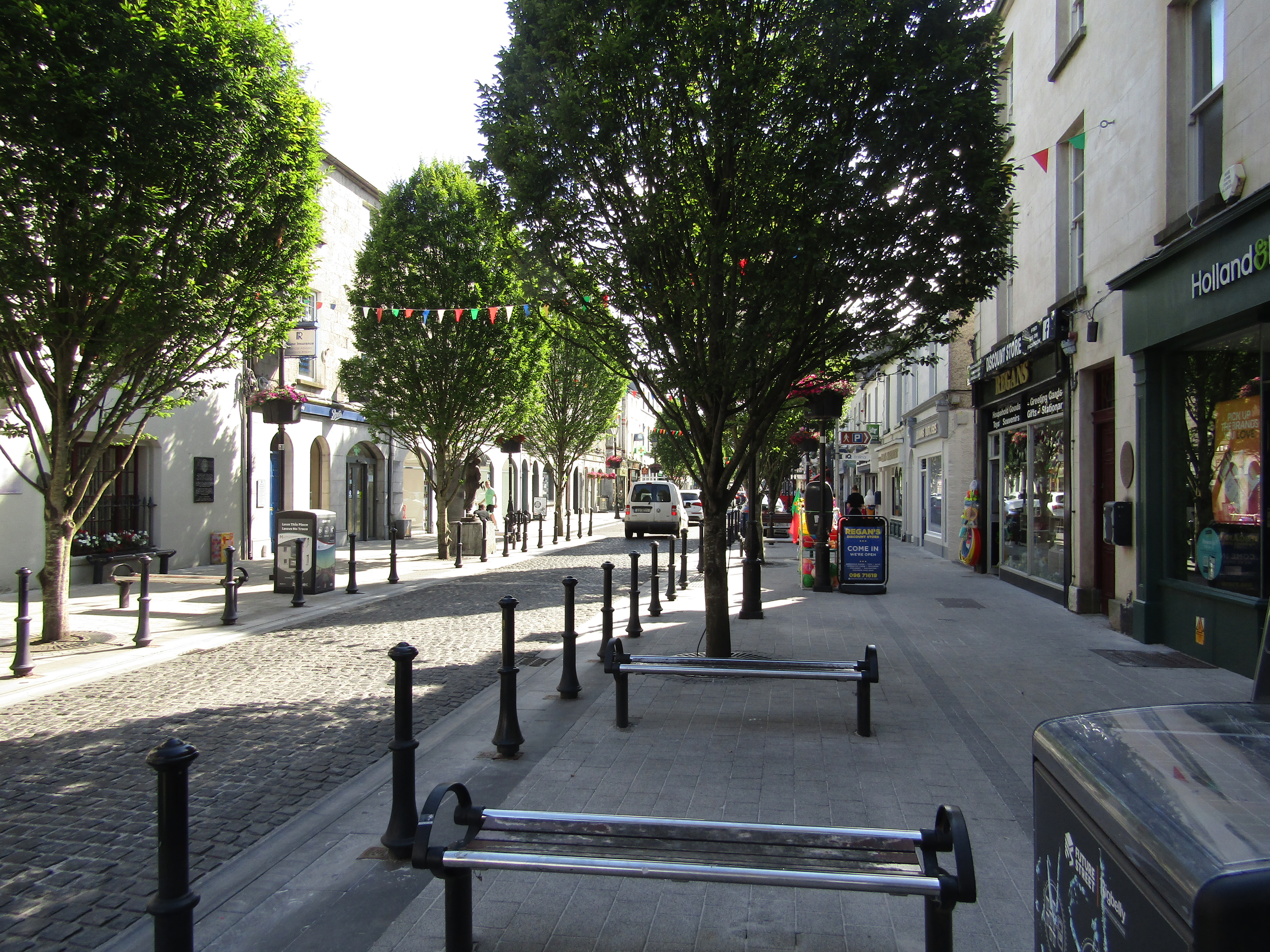
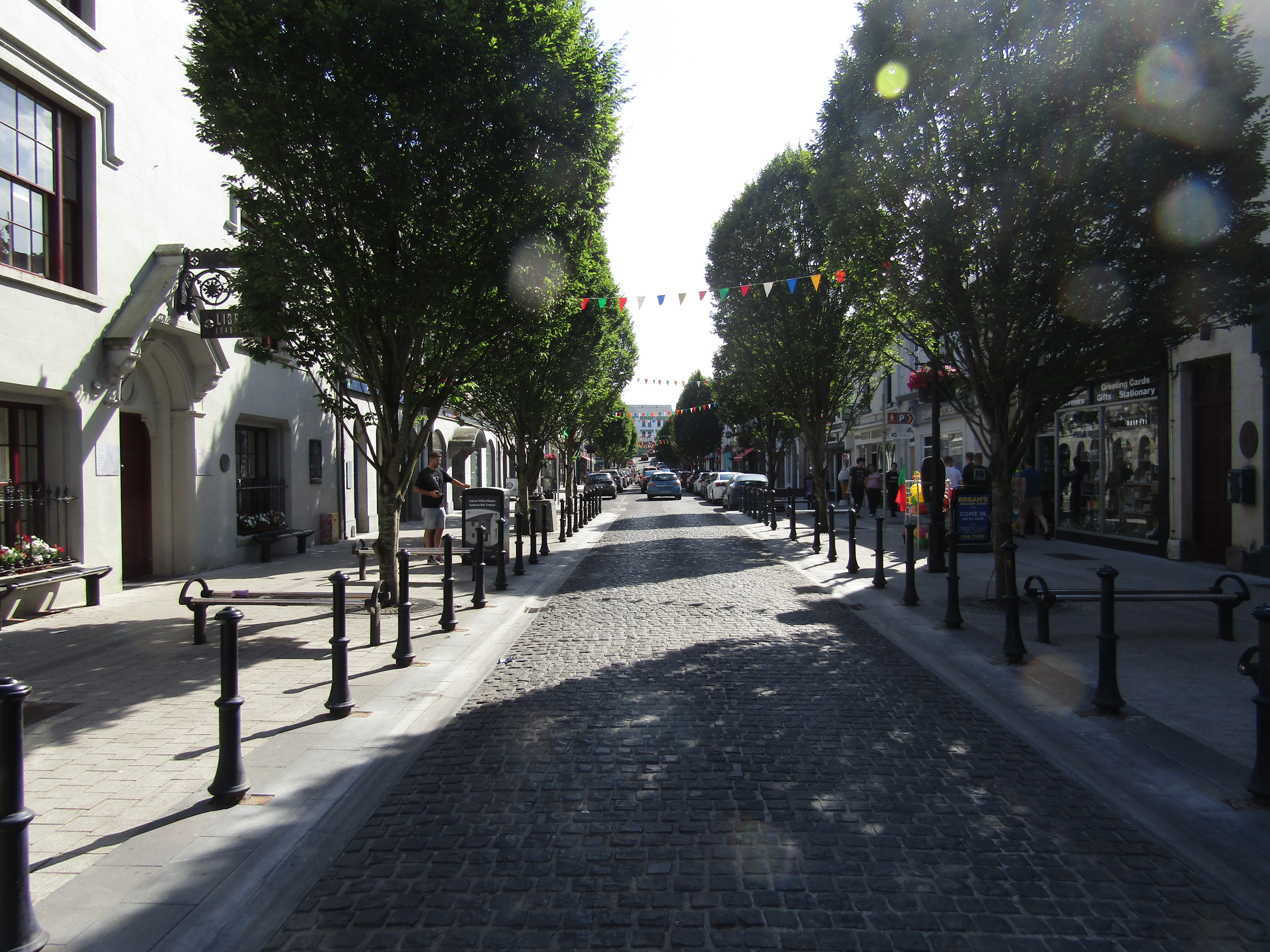
- Top: "Knox Street", now known as Pearse Street, in the late 19th Century.
- Bottom: Pearse Street in 2025

==== Great Famine ====
In the first half of the 19th century, the rural areas around Ballina were heavily dependent on the potato as a primary source of food. When a potato blight struck in 1846, widespread starvation occurred. The Ballina workhouse served the entire northwestern coast of County Mayo. As the famine took hold in the rural areas, huge numbers of starving peasants requested admission to the overcrowded facility. In February 1847, people were dying of fever at the rate of almost ninety persons a week. There were attempts at mitigating the crisis by some local citizens. Francis Kinkead, the local Church of Ireland curate, who came to Ballina in 1837 and died on 27 January 1847, played a role in organising funds to help relieve the suffering of both the Catholic and Protestant populations. A marble memorial tablet on the wall of the Church of Ireland in Ballina is dedicated to Kinkead.

=== 20th century ===
==== Irish language ====
Until the early 1900s, the Irish language was the primary language spoken in Ballina. As Irish began to decline in other parts of Ireland during the colonial period, it remained strong in County Mayo and in Ballina. By the 1920s, however, English had become the dominant language in Ballina. In the 1926 Census it was found that although many adults in Ballina had Irish as a first language, it was no longer known by young people or used in the community. Ballina was one of the only parts of County Mayo not designated status as a Gaeltacht or Breac-Ghaeltacht, a status given in 1929 to regions where more than 80% or 25% respectively of people spoke Irish as a first language.

Ballina and Westport were among the first urban areas in County Mayo to adopt the English language. Records from the surrounding then Irish-speaking rural areas in Mayo and in neighbouring County Sligo suggest that Irish-speakers from those areas felt pressure to use English when in Ballina town. Today only Ceathrú Thaidhg, 70 km to the west of Ballina remains a majority Irish-speaking area in County Mayo.

==== War of Independence ====
During the Irish War of Independence, a number of violent incidents occurred in Ballina. In April 1920, a group of armed men targeted the houses of income-tax collectors living in the town. They forcibly entered the homes, held the occupants at gunpoint, and seized important books and papers related to tax collection. This event was part of a larger, coordinated series of attacks across Ireland, focusing on disrupting the administrative functions of income tax collection. In July 1920, a Royal Irish Constabulary (RIC) police patrol was held up by armed men about a hundred yards from Ballina's barracks. The raiders demanded the surrender of the police's arms. The police opened fire, and the raiders returned fire, killing a sergeant and wounding a constable. Two other policemen escaped unharmed.

In January 1921, auxiliary police arrested and humiliated several local merchants, reportedly forcing them to march through the town, holding Union Jacks, dragging an Irish flag, and kneeling to kiss the Union Jack. This incident reportedly caused outrage throughout the town. During the evening of 3 April 1921, the IRA attacked a police patrol travelling between Ballina and Bonniconlon, wounding one constable. A cache of ammunition was later found in the grove where the attack took place. The police subsequently raided a local dance hall and arrested all men present.

Michael Tolan, a tailor and IRA member from Ballina, was the victim of a murder marked by torture and mutilation. After a raid on his mother's house, Tolan was forced into hiding. On 14 April 1921, Crown forces captured him while he was staying at a friend's home, after which he was detained in a barracks. Despite efforts by his mother and friends to trace his whereabouts, all contact ceased. In June 1921, his mutilated body was discovered in Shraheen bog near Foxford, bearing bullet wounds, a bayonet injury, and amputated feet. He was identified by his distinctive feet. The manner of his death caused widespread outrage.

In May 1921, two men, Thomas Jordan and William Leydon, were court-martialed at Renmore Barracks in Galway, and found guilty of carrying firearms. During the trial, it was alleged that, on 23 November 1921, seven masked men attempted a raid on a house in Ballina. Four of the raiders entered the house, and during a scuffle, residents managed to unmask two of them, identifying Jordan and Leydon. Despite Leydon's refusal to recognise the court's authority and the testimony of witnesses who provided alibis placing him at a different location at the time of the raid, both he and Jordan were sentenced to one year of hard labour.

On 14 July 1921, the body of RIC Sergeant Anthony Foody was discovered on a road near Bonniconlon, with a card around his neck reading "Remember Dwyer and The Rag". Foody, who had been posted to The Ragg in Tipperary and was on leave when he was shot dead, had been visiting a farm he had purchased with plans to settle there with his family. The card found with Foody's body may have referred to the controversial killing of the Dwyer brothers in Tipperary, allegedly by other RIC members, though accounts of that event vary.

==== Irish Civil War ====
During the Irish Civil War (1922–1923), a number of incidents occurred in Ballina and its surrounding districts. For example, in September 1922, Castle Gore, the Mayo residence of the Earl of Arran, was attacked and set on fire by Anti-Treaty Irregulars. The castle, constructed in 1808 under the supervision of Lord Tyrawley, housed a collection of antique furniture and oil paintings. Around 350 precious works of art were destroyed in the blaze.

In March 1923, an Anti-Treaty Irregular — Nicholas Corcoran — was captured near Lahardane by the Free State Army from Ballina and imprisoned in the town. Subsequently, he and other prisoners were taken to clear a barricade from the railway at Ballinahaglish. When Corcoran refused to help remove the barricades, he was shot by a Free State soldier — Vol. Daniel Boyle — while kneeling. Boyle was charged with Corcoran's murder at Ballina District Court the following week.

=== 21st century ===
Ballina Urban District Council was based in offices in Market Square until 2003, when new offices were completed in Arran Place. Ballina Urban District was disbanded in June 2014 alongside all other Town councils as part of the Local Government Reform Act 2014.

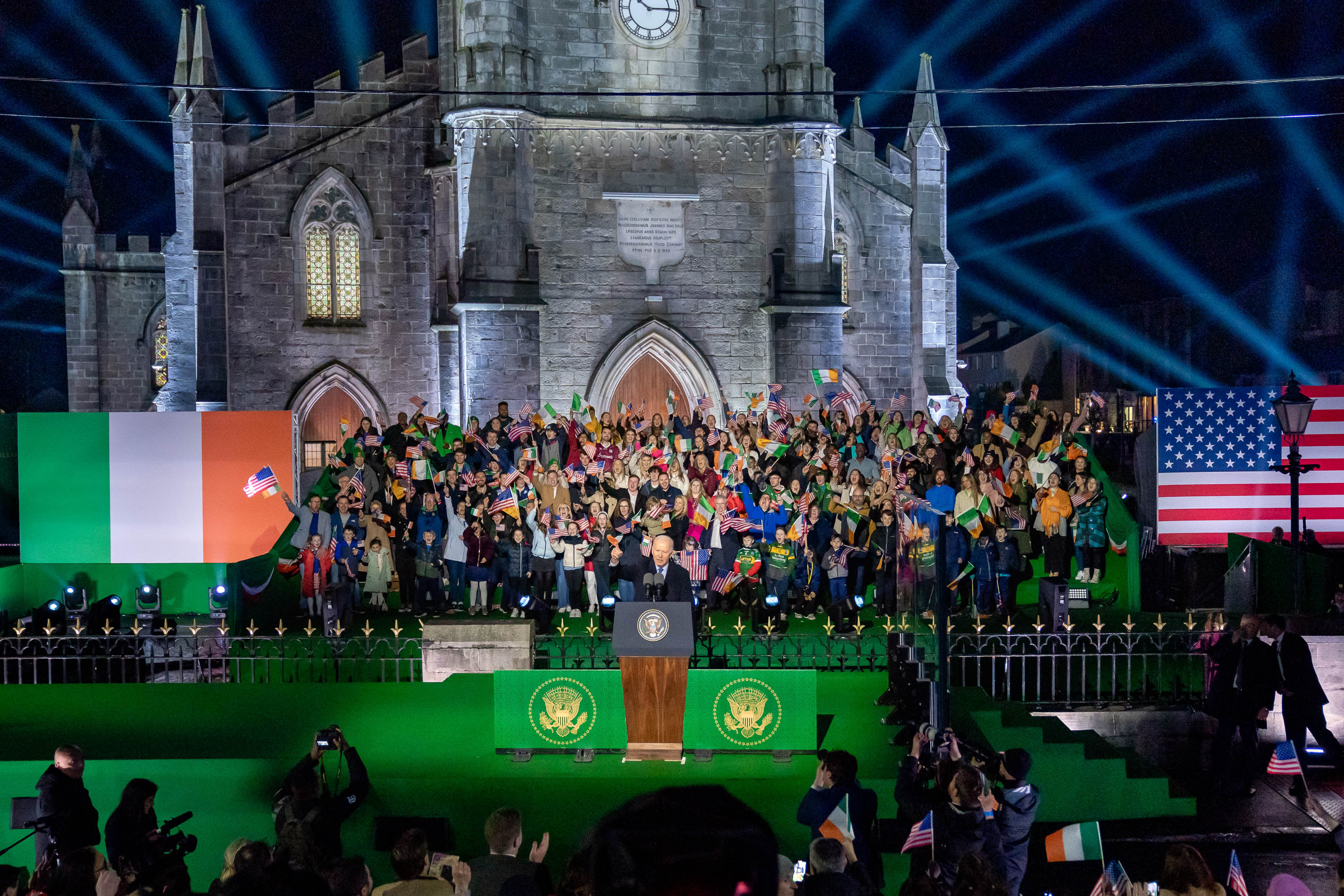
US President Joe Biden delivering a speech in front of St Muredach's Cathedral in Ballina

On 14 April 2023, the US president Joe Biden visited the town and gave a keynote speech to tens of thousands of people on the final part of his four-day visit to the island of Ireland. His speech commemorated the 25th anniversary of the Good Friday Agreement. His speech also highlighted his family links to both Ballina and County Mayo.

In November 2024, Ballina completed the €7.5 million redevelopment of its historic military barracks (built in 1742) into the Ballina Innovation Quarter. Several businesses have occupied parts of the site and, if expanded as planned, it is expected to support up to 200 direct and 60 indirect jobs when fully operational.

== Architecture ==
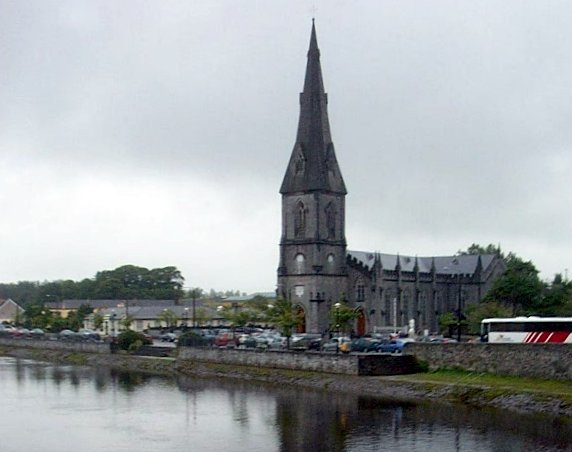
St Muredach's Cathedral on the banks of the River Moy in Ballina

The town's architectural heritage includes the 15th-century Moyne Abbey, and St Muredach's Cathedral, which is the Cathedral church of the Roman Catholic Diocese of Killala. Work on the cathedral began in 1827. The stone was quarried locally and the roof and ceiling were completed before the Great Famine (1845). The spire was completed in 1855 and by 1875 the organ had been commissioned.

Ballina has a number of listed buildings, including Georgian housing on the banks of the Moy, the Ice House building (since converted into a hotel), and the former Provincial Bank of Ireland building (now housing the Jackie Clarke Museum). The streets of Ballina consist mainly of three and four-storey Georgian and Victorian buildings, though the structures of several buildings are far older.

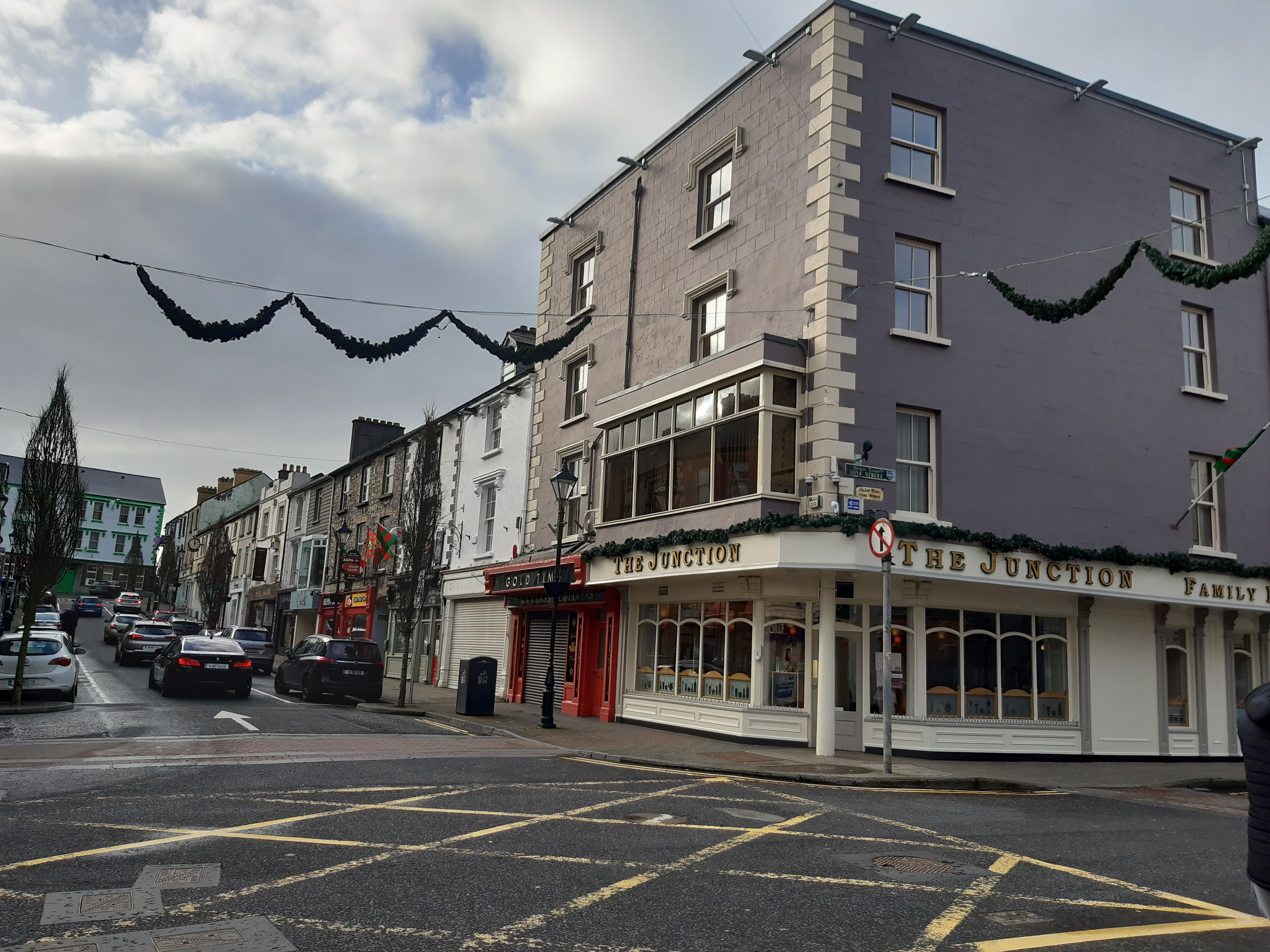
Ballina, County Mayo

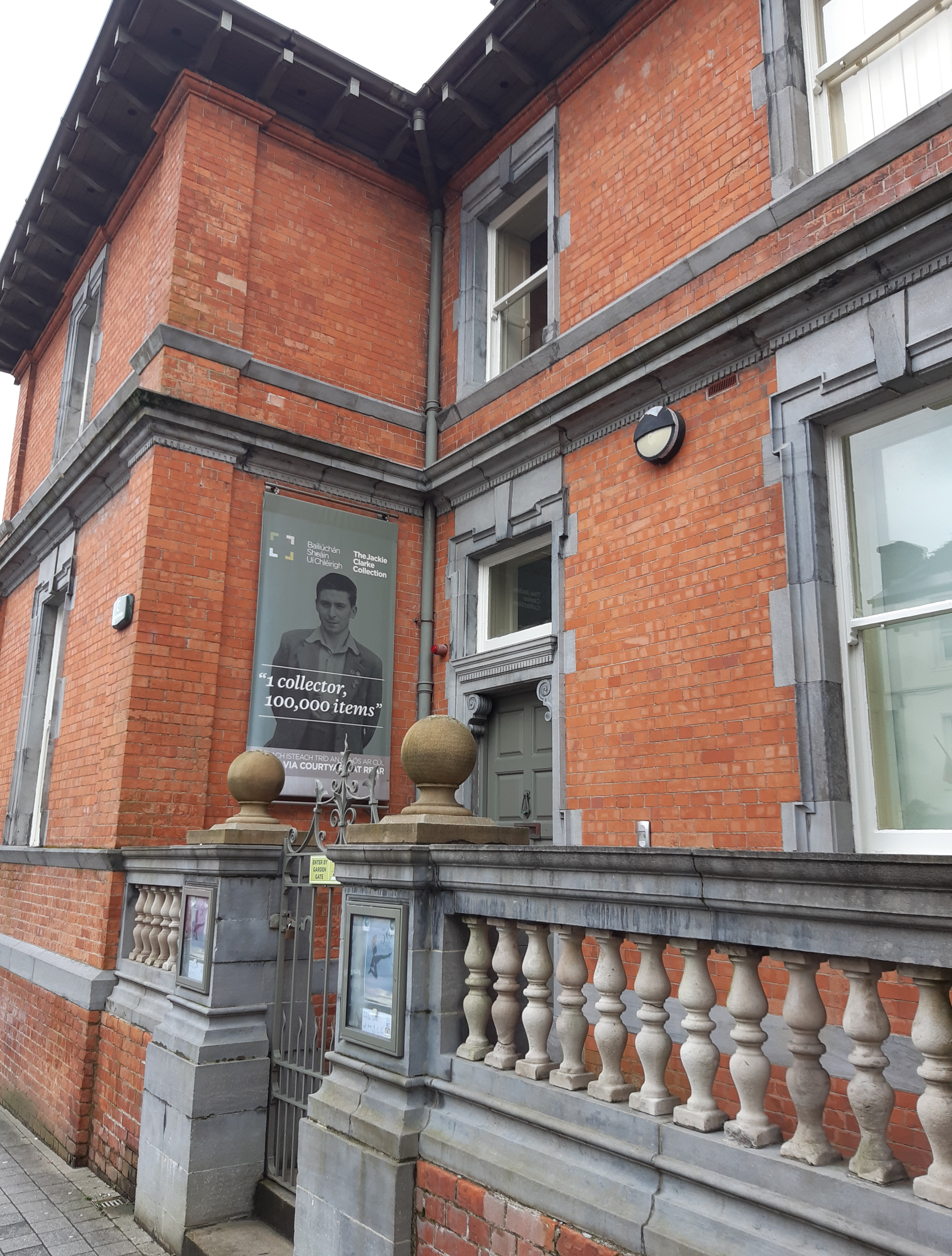
Jackie Clarke Building Ballina

== Infrastructure ==
=== Education ===
The primary schools that serve the town include Scoil Iosa of the Convent of Mercy (mixed), Scoil Padraig (all-boys), the Quay NS (mixed), Culleens NS on the Killala Road (mixed), Breaffy NS (mixed), Behy NS (mixed) and Scoil na gCeithre Maol (mixed), a gaelscoil situated on the Killala Road. There are also at least three montessori schools and many pre-schools.

There are three secondary schools; St Muredach's College (all-male), Moyne College (mixed), and St Mary's Secondary School (all-female).

A large special education facility opened on McDermott Street (Convent Hill) for the 2009–2010 school year to serve as a new, joint-campus space for two pre-existing special schools, St. Dympna's School and St. Nicholas' School.

The Newman Institute is located in a building near St Muredach's Cathedral. It is a charitable organisation working in conjunction with the Roman Catholic Diocese of Killala in the field of Catholic education.

=== Communications and media ===
BCRfm (Ballina Community Radio) is the community radio station in the town. The Western People is a local newspaper, based in Ballina, which was previously also printed at its premises in the town. Two weekly freesheets, the Mayo Advertiser and The Northwest Express are distributed throughout Ballina. There is also a monthly magazine called "Mayo Now" that was launched in March 2015. The Connaught Telegraph, published in Castlebar, and the Mayo News, published in Westport, also carry local news related to Ballina. Mid West Radio is the local station, with an office in the town.

Historically, a number of newspapers have been directly linked with the town, including:

- Ballina Advertiser, Mayo And Sligo Commercial Gazette (10 Jan 1840 – 10 November 1843)
- Ballina Chronicle (2 May 1849 – 14 August 1851; M/W Connaught Watchman)
- Ballina Herald (1844 – Oct 1961; C/A 'Ballina Herald and Mayo and Sligo Advertiser')
- Ballina Herald and Mayo and Sligo Advertiser (Oct 1891 – 28 April 1962; M/W 'Western People')
- Ballina Impartial, or Tyrawly Advertiser (13 Jan 1823 – 16 November 1835)
- Ballina Journal and Connaught Advertiser (C/A 1880 – 11 March 1895)
- Connaught Watchman (2 Aug 1851 – 3 October 1863)
- Tyrawly Herald; or Mayo and Sligo Intelligencer (1844–1870)
- Western Gem (1843)
- Western Journal (1977 – 15 February 1980; C/A Sligo Journal 22 February 1980 – 11 March 1983)
- Western People (1883 – present)
- Western Star (1835–1837)

[ M/W = merged with; C/A = continued as ]

Throughout the 1980s, Ballina had a number of local radio stations before the advent of legalised local radio in 1989. These stations included Alternative Radio West (which operated from Lord Edward Street) and Castle Radio (which was based in Belleek Castle).

== Transport links ==
=== Roads ===
The N26 is the main road to Dublin: it leaves the town south to Foxford, and after Swinford joins the N5 to Dublin. N59 comes from Belmullet and Crossmolina in the west, and goes through the town to Sligo to the northeast. The R314 is a regional road to Killala, and then Ballycastle. The R294 goes to south County Sligo via 'the Windy Gap' in the Ox Mountains. It is used as an alternative route to Dublin, via Tubbercurry and Boyle.

=== Bridges ===
There are two main bridges straddling the Moy in the town centre. The first, the Armstrong and West, or Lower bridge, was built in 1835. The second, the Hamm bridge or Upper bridge, was built in the following year of 1836 by Thomas Hamm at a cost of £3,000.00. Both bridges are limestone, and have 4 and 5 arches respectively. Traffic flows in a one-way direction around these 2 bridges and is often heavily backed up on both sides, the reason for calls for a third bridge further down the river.

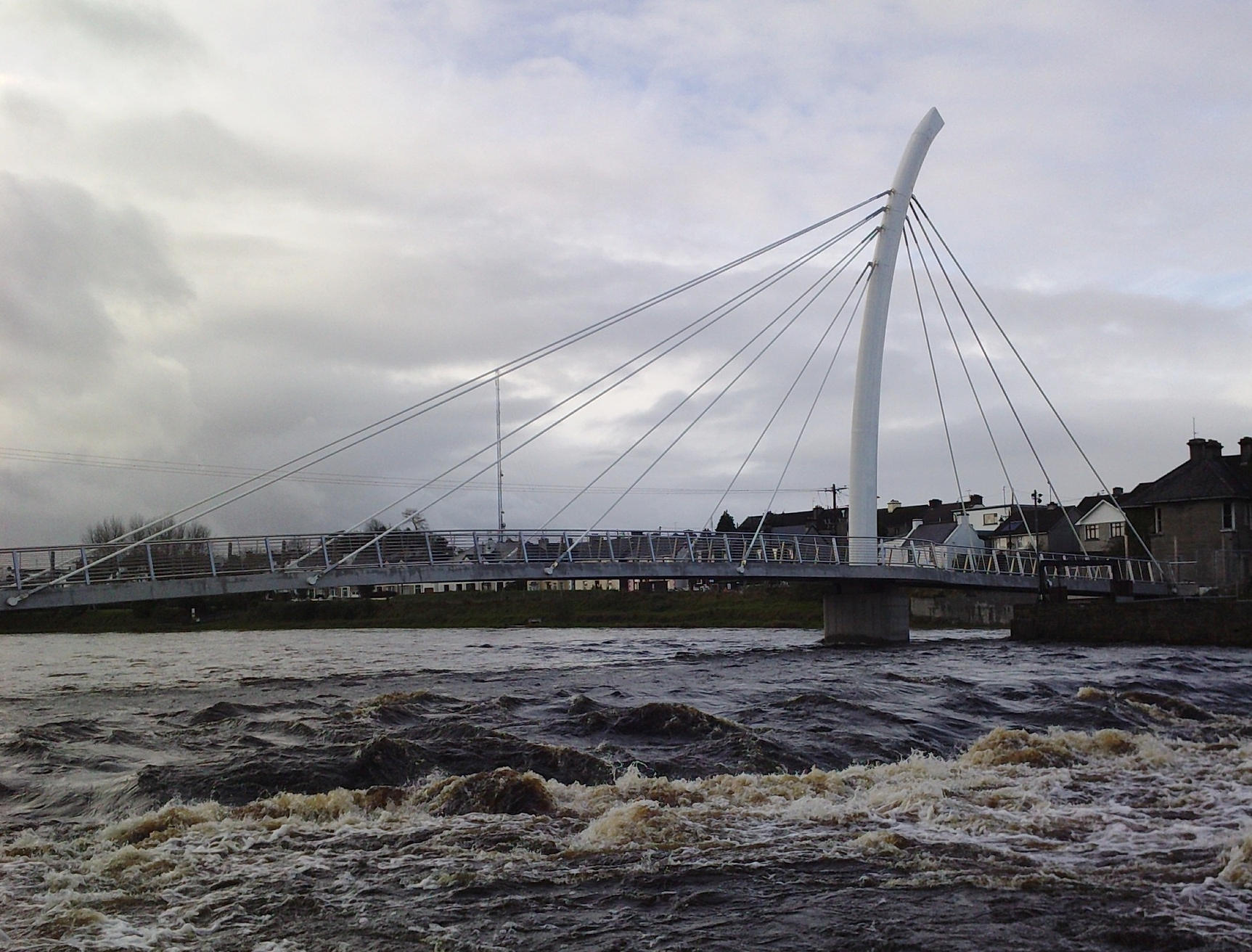
The Salmon Weir Bridge over the River Moy

The Salmon Weir Bridge is a pedestrian bridge over the River Moy from Barrett St. to Ridge Pool Rd. The bridge, which was designed to resemble a fishing rod, was opened in July 2009.

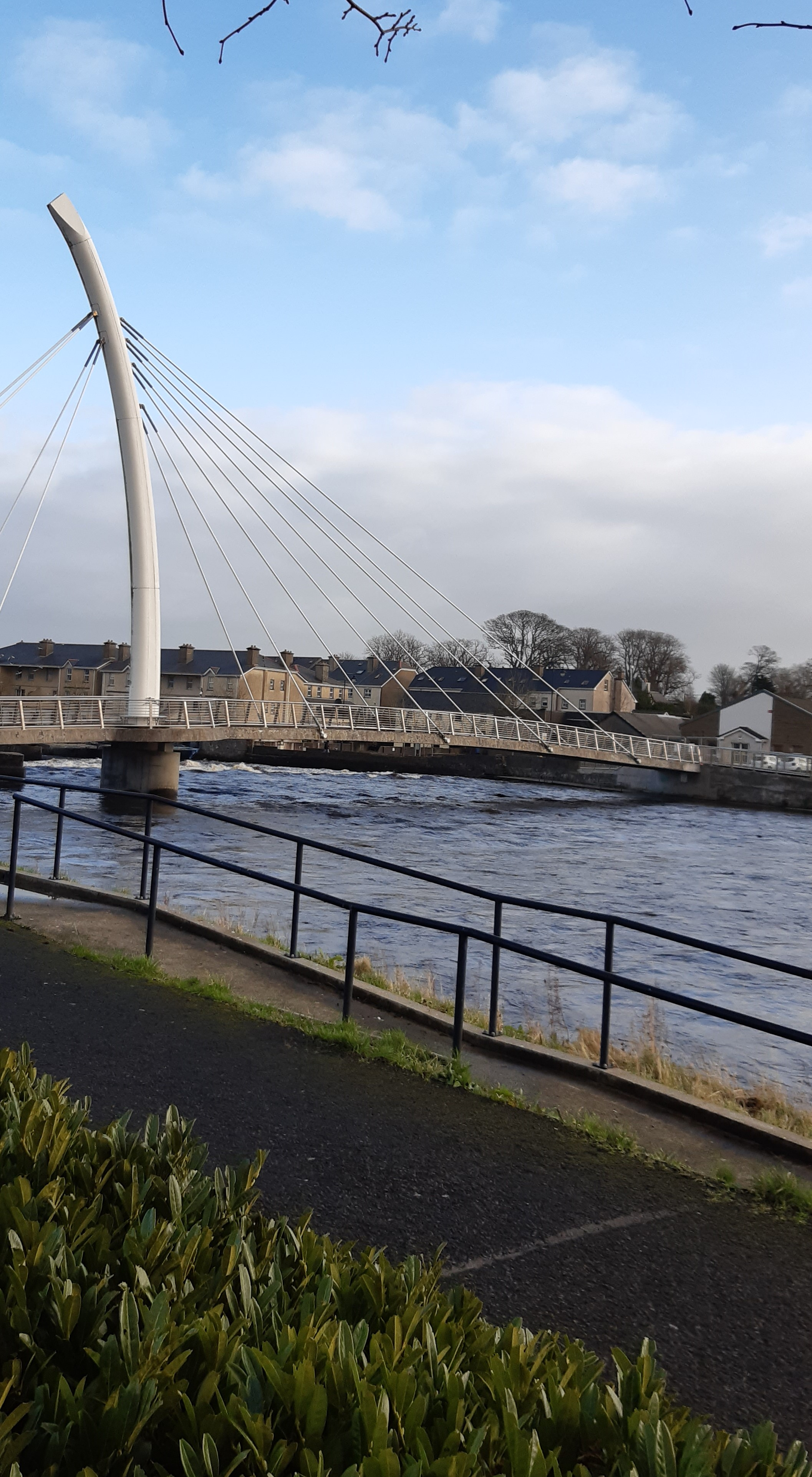
Salmon Weir Bridge

=== Bus ===
Ballina Bus Station is host to a Bus Éireann bus depot. As of 2008, Bus Éireann reportedly stated an intention to develop services similar to the 24-hour Dublin-Belfast route on the Ballina-Dublin route. The route currently runs seven services a day between Ballina and the capital. In 2007, Bus Éireann launched a direct bus from Dublin Airport to Ballina. A Ballina to Enniscrone bus is run by several companies during the summer months.

=== Rail ===
Ballina railway station is located on the N26 beside the bus station. Departing Iarnród Éireann passenger trains stop at Foxford before terminating at Manulla Junction, where passengers can connect to trains going to Castlebar, Westport or Dublin (Heuston Station). 6 services operate each way on weekdays, with 5 and 4 services on Saturday and Sunday respectively.

Ballina is also a rail freight hub, and contains Iarnród Éireann's only facility for loading containers at present. Container trains operate from Ballina to Dublin Port and Waterford Port, although services to Dublin Port are suspended until 2027 while upgrade works take place there. Additionally, pulpwood is transported for Coillte, from Ballina to their plant in Waterford.

=== Air ===
Ireland West Airport (Knock Airport, NOC) is about 50.7 km, or 31.5 miles from Ballina. Bus Éireann runs a shuttle service about five times a day from the airport to Charlestown, from where commuters can get a connecting bus to Ballina.

== Tourism and culture ==
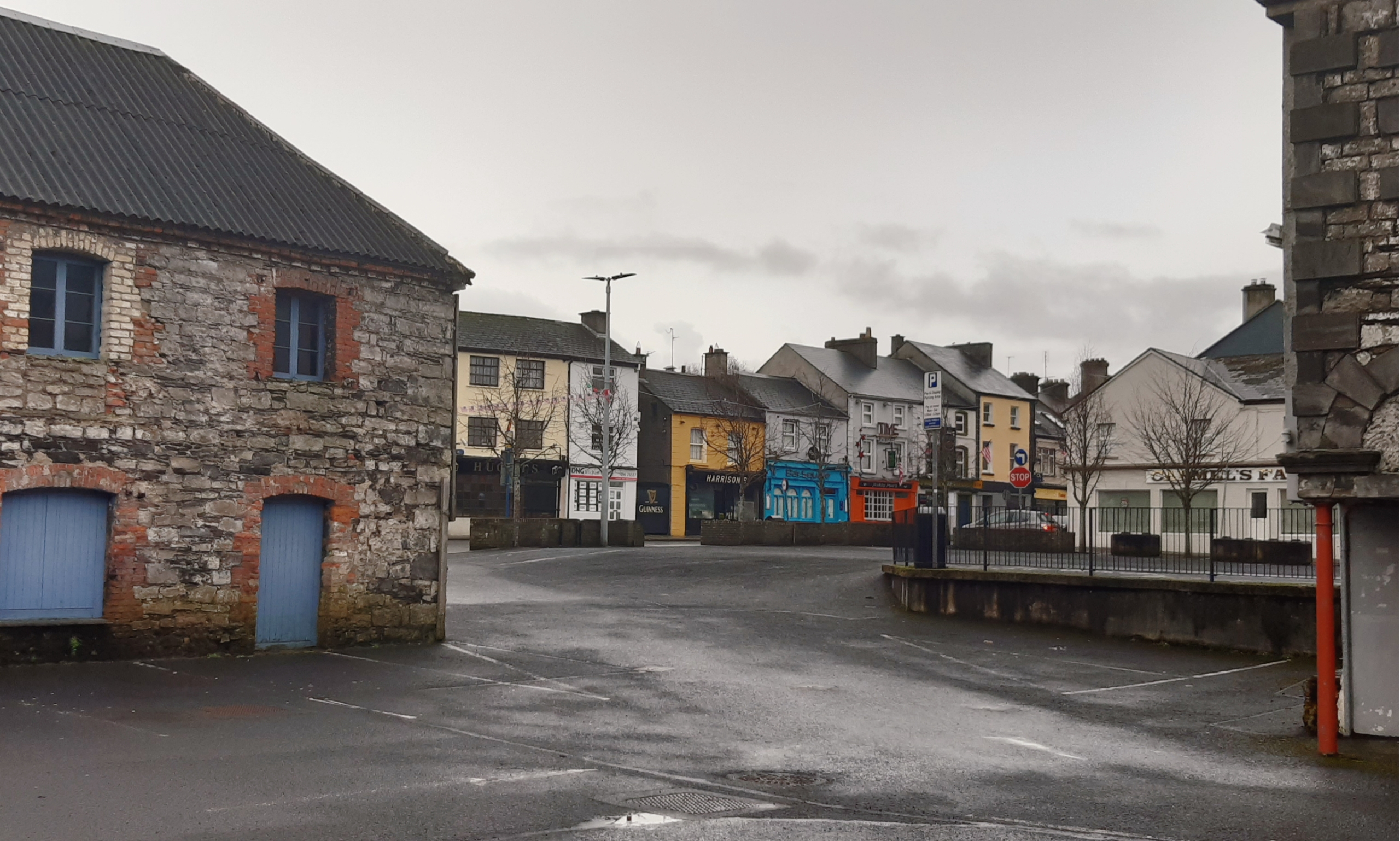
Ballina town centre

=== Museum and arts ===
Between 2009 and 2011, the former Newman Institute building on Barrett Street was redeveloped into the Ballina Arts Centre, a multi-disciplinary creative hub.

In 2009, the Jackie Clarke Collection went on display when the Clarke Museum opened in the old provincial bank. During his lifetime, Clarke sourced and purchased a number of rare documents, including sole surviving copies of publications, rare handbills and proclamations, unpublished manuscripts and political writings. He donated his collections to the state, under the condition that they would stay in Ballina.

Other attractions include the Belleek Castle Museum.

=== Angling ===
Ballina's location on the River Moy favours salmon fishing, and one of the most popular spots, the Ridge Pool, is situated in the centre of the town. The Ballina Salmon Festival is held annually in July in the town. The festival includes 'Heritage Day', where much of the centre of the town is closed to traffic and the streets occupied by stalls and demonstrations of vintage vehicles.

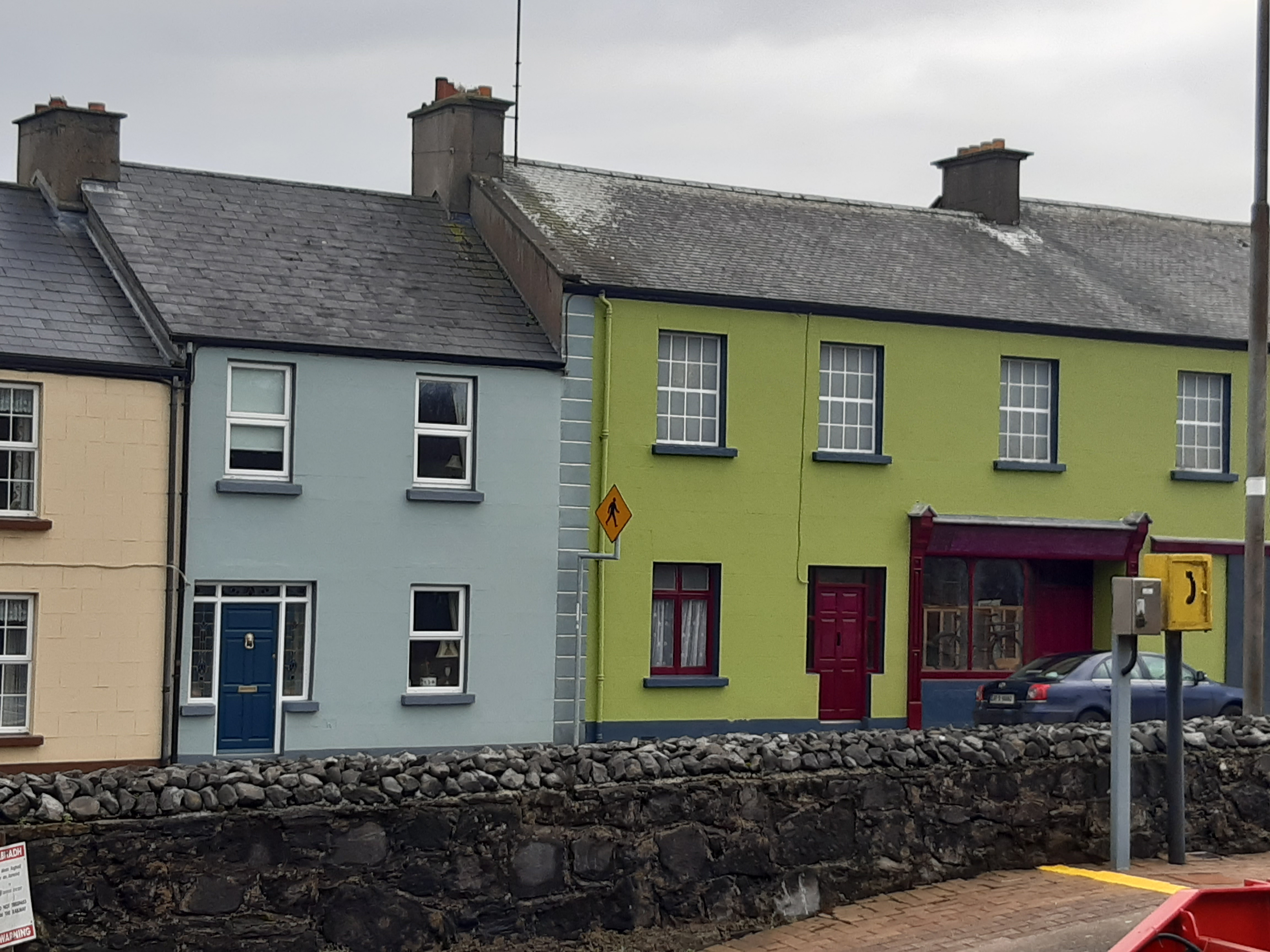
Houses on Station Road in Ballina

== Sport ==
Ballina Stephenites is one of the local Gaelic Athletic Association club teams. The name also refers to the town's Gaelic Athletic Association grounds, James Stephens Park.

Ballina Town is the town's soccer club, playing their home matches at Belleek Park. Ballina R.F.C. is located in the Quay and competes in the Connacht J1A League.

Ballina's athletics club has a floodlight outdoor 400m track and a cross country pitch which sometimes holds the AAI Connacht and Mayo finals. The local triathlon club, Liquid Motion, holds a triathlon in the town every summer.

In basketball, Merry Monk Ballina (Ballina Braves) play in the Basketball Ireland Development League (BIDL), and Team Loftus Recycling represent the town in Men's Division 2.

Ballina also has a gymnastics training centre, Nadia Gym, and a martial arts school. Ballina Golf Club, an 18-hole parkland golf course, is on the outskirts of the town.

A short lived greyhound racing track was opened by the Ballina Greyhound Racing Company Ltd in the town on 6 May 1948. The site near Coolcran farm was replaced by the Dunleavy cattle farm market in 1956.

== Notable people ==
- Martin Birrane, racing driver
- Tibbot MacWalter Kittagh Bourke, 17th century Irish lord
- Dara Calleary, politician
- Jack Charlton, owned a holiday home in Ballina
- Gavin Duffy, former rugby player
- Ray Foley, radio DJ
- Michael Gaughan, Irish Republican Army hunger striker
- David Heffernan, sportsman
- Ivan Heffernan, sportsman
- Michelle Mulherin, politician
- Peter Quinn, Gaelic footballer
- Mary Robinson, President of Ireland from 1990 to 1997
- Sarah Rowe, sportsperson
- William E. Shannon, American politician; born in Ballina
- Edward Whelan, Canadian politician; born in Ballina
- Garron Noone, musician, comedian and TikToker
- Norah Patten, an aeronautical engineer selected to potentially become the Irish first person in space on board a Virgin Galactic spacecraft.
- The great-great-grandfather of Joe Biden – the 46th president of the United States – came from Ballina. Biden visited the town in 2016, and returned – as US president – in 2023.

== Twin towns ==
Ballina is twinned with:

- Craigavon, Northern Ireland, United Kingdom
- Athis-Mons, Île-de-France, France
- Pittsfield, Massachusetts, United States
- Scranton, Pennsylvania, United States
- Ballina, New South Wales, Australia

== Gallery ==
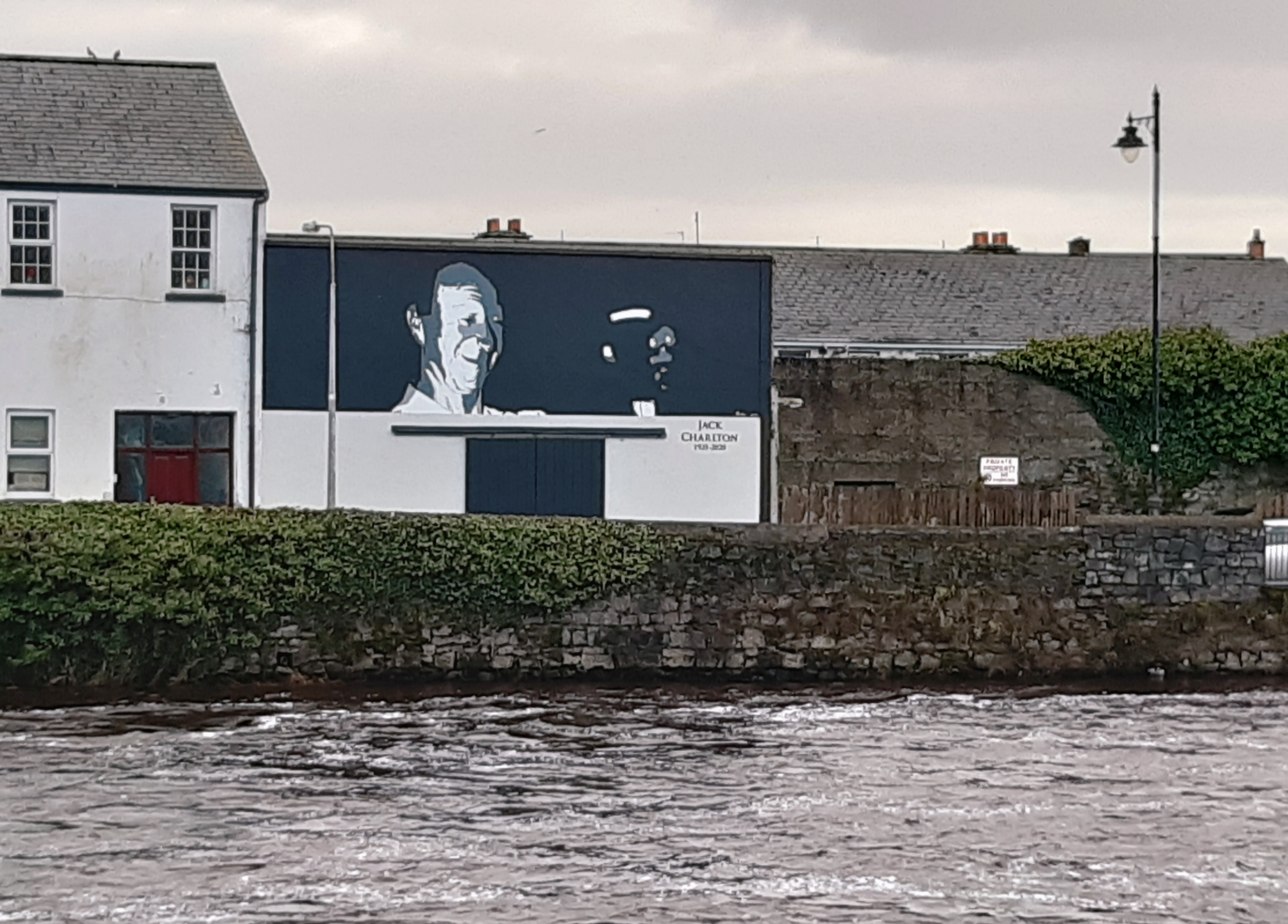
Riverside mural Ballina

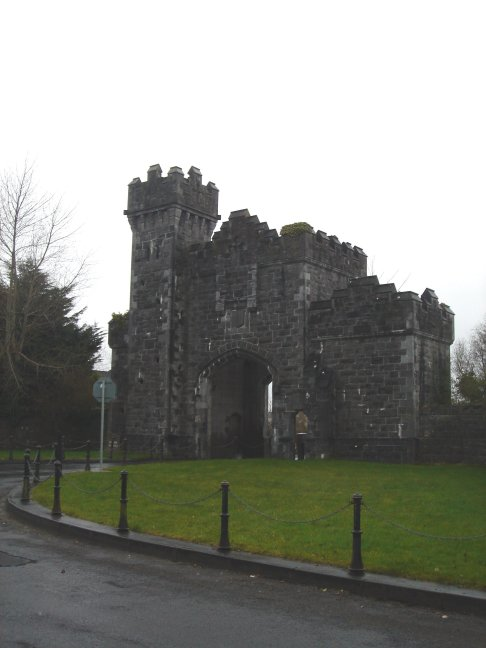
Gate House at Belleek Forest Park

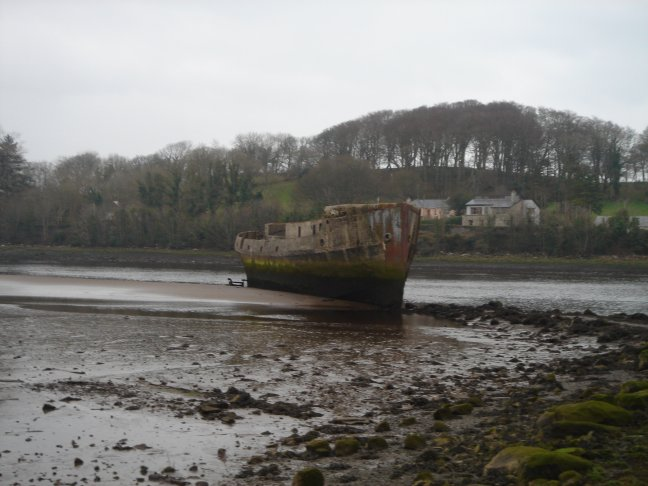
The concrete ship SS Creteboom in the River Moy

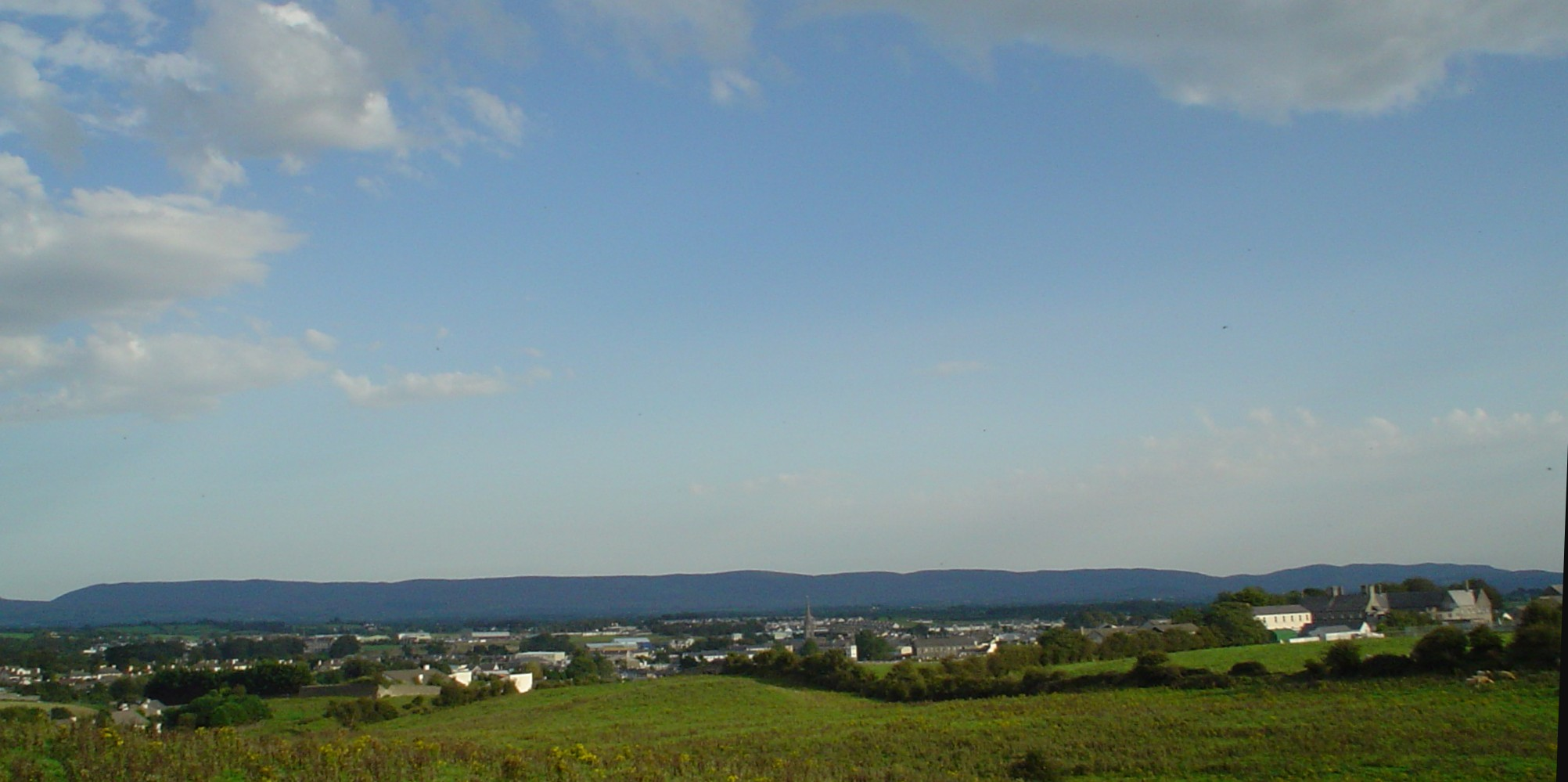
View of the town from beside Leigue Graveyard; one of the highest points in area

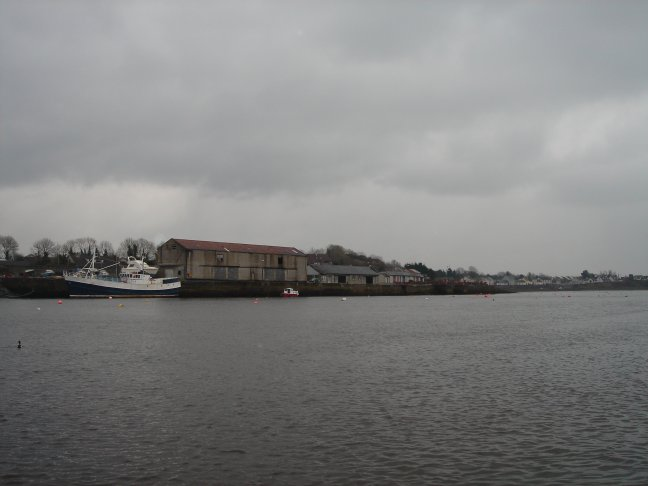
The Quay, at Crocketstown, Ballina

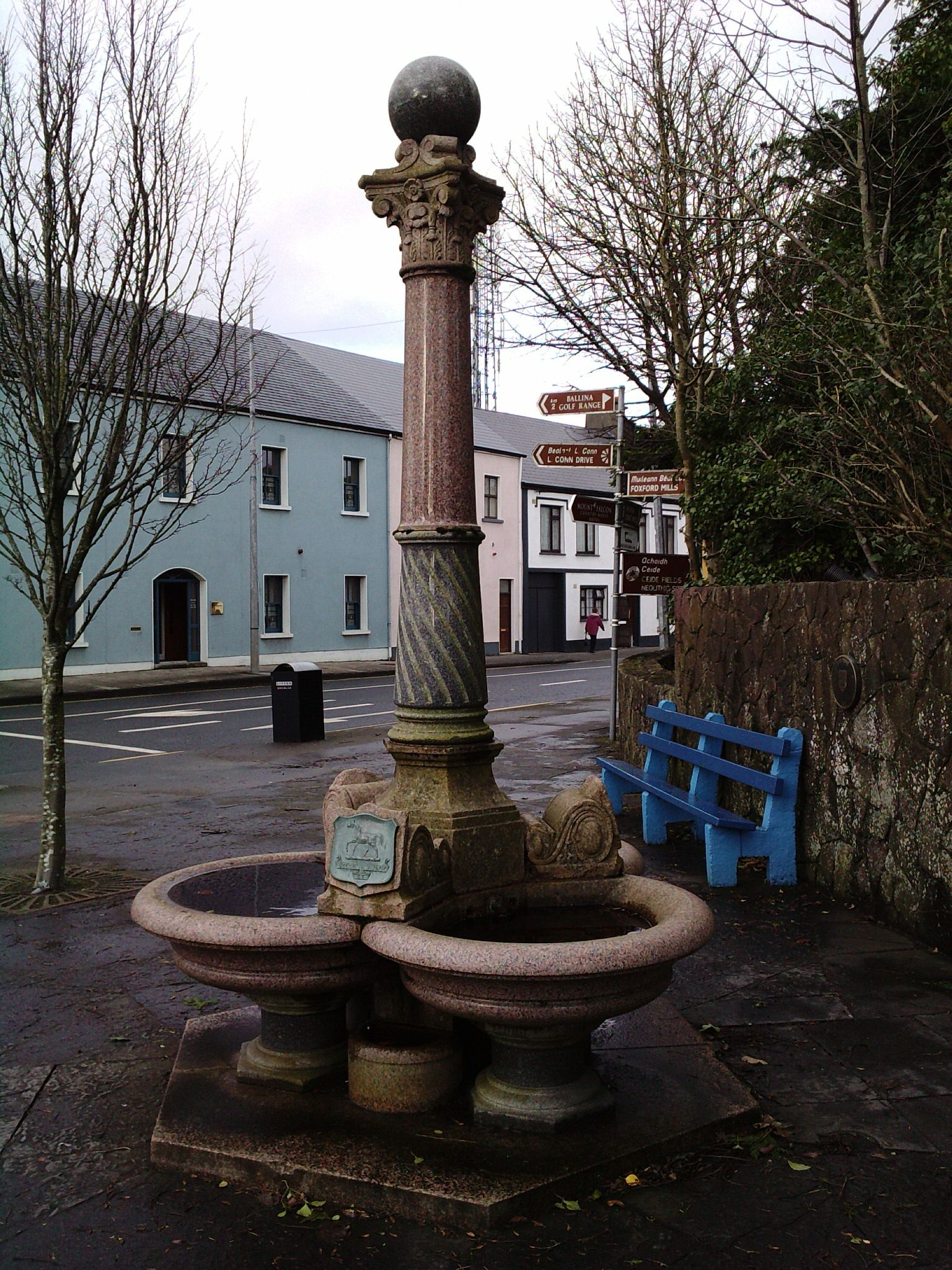
Font on Teeling Street

== See also ==
- List of towns and villages in Ireland
- Céide Fields
- Rappa Castle
- Wild Atlantic Way
