= Edward Louis Lawrenson =

Irish painter (1868–1940)

- Born: 14 March 1868; Dublin, Ireland
- Died: 23 December 1940 (aged 72); Royal Sussex County Hospital, England
- Occupation: Painter

Edward Louis Lawrenson (14 March 1868 – 23 December 1940) was an Irish painter of landscapes and an etcher.

== Life and family ==
Lawrenson was born in Dublin on 14 March 1868. His parents were Edward and Alice Lawrenson (née Bland). He attended the Dublin School of Art for 6 months and Trinity College Dublin. He then joined the army, as was traditional in his family. He served with the Connacht Rangers for 7 years, continuing to sketch and paint. He became a "working member" of the Dublin Sketching Club in 1897. He exhibited for the first time with the Watercolour Society of Ireland in 1898 from his address of Belleek Manor, Ballina, and continued to exhibit with them until 1930. After leaving the army in 1900, Lawrenson went to Paris to study art. He first studied with Filippo Colarossi, and then studied under Alphonse Mucha. Lawrenson then went to Holland to study under George Hitchcock.

He married Charlotte Mary Rose Lawrenson (née Thompson), a portrait and mural painter born in Dublin. They lived at Nurney, Hadlow Down, Surrey. He died on 23 December 1940 at the Royal Sussex County Hospital.

== Career ==
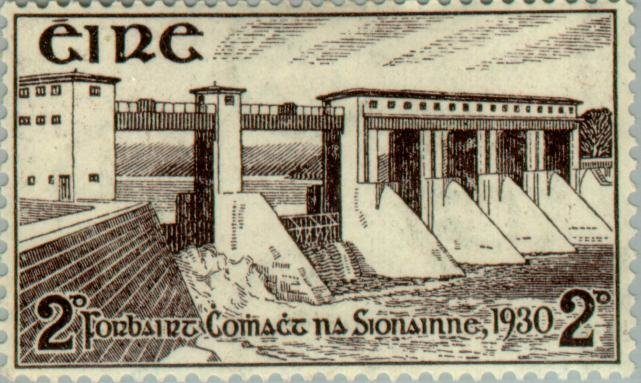
1930 Shannon Scheme stamp by Lawrenson

After a period in Holland, Lawrenson moved to London. By 1910, he had established a studio at 20 Holland Park Road, London. Lawrenson was a close friend of the English painter, Harold Speed, and they would go on painting trips together in Lawrenson's car. Lawrenson continued to visit the Continent to paint, as well as rural England.

In 1906, Lawrenson was awarded the gold medal for colour printing from copper plates at the Milan International Exhibition. He learnt etching from the lectures of Frank Short. He gave his own lecture and demonstration of colour etching and aquatint in Dublin in 1911. He exhibited with a number of societies and galleries including the Alpine Gallery, the Fine Art Society, the Royal Academy, the Royal Hibernian Academy, and the Royal Scottish Academy. He was a member of the Art Workers' Guild.

Lawrenson was one of a group of artists who worked on the designs for the first bank notes and coins of the Irish Free State in the 1920s alongside John Lavery and Dermod O'Brien, with his coin designs focusing on views from the Irish landscape. His work was part of the painting event in the art competition at the 1928 Summer Olympics. In 1930, he designed a stamp to commemorate the Shannon Scheme's completion.

Works by Lawrenson are held in the British Museum, the Towner Gallery, Brighton and Hove Museum and Art Gallery, and Manchester Art Gallery. A selection of Lawrenson's aquatint etchings were exhibited as part of the National Gallery of Ireland's Making their Mark: Irish Painter-Etchers 1880-1930 exhibition in 2019.
