= Charlotte Lawrenson =

Irish artist

- Born: Charlotte Mary Rose Thompson; 31 August 1883; Dublin, Ireland
- Died: 26 July 1965 (aged 81)
- Known for: portrait and mural painting, lithography

Charlotte Lawrenson (31 August 1883 – 26 July 1965) was an Irish portrait and mural painter and lithographer.

== Life and family ==
Charlotte Lawrenson was born Charlotte Mary Rose Thompson in Dublin on 31 August 1883. Her father, Robert Healy Thompson, was a poet and writer who published under the name Robert Blake. Lawrenson attended Loreto Convent, Omagh and the University College, London. She received her initial artistic training from Sir William Orpen at the Chelsea Art School.

She married the artist, Edward Louis Lawrenson, also born in Dublin. They lived at Nurney, Hadlow Down, Surrey. They had one son, Ralph, who served in the British Army.

After the death of her husband in 1940, Lawrenson lived in East Africa, settling in Nakuru, Kenya. She died on 26 July 1965, though some sources give her death date as 1971.

== Career ==
She studied at the Slade School of Fine Art, winning the Wilson Steer Prize, and Byam Shaw School of Drawing and Painting, where she won first prize for an oil portrait and second prize for a head drawing.

She exhibited with the Royal Academy, showing 16 works between 1921 and 1945, including a pencil drawing of her son, Ralph in 1935. She also exhibited with the International Society of Sculptors, Painters and Gravers, the London Salon, the Royal Society of Painters, the Walker Art Gallery, the Royal Scottish Academy and the Royal Hibernian Academy (RHA). She exhibited with the RHA from before her marriage, showing a portrait of Miss Emmie Le Fanu in 1909. From the 1920s, Lawrenson moved to lithography, studying under Ernest Jackson. She exhibited alongside her husband at the first exhibition of the Society of Graphic Art in 1921.

Lawrenson was a member of the Society of Mural Decorators and Painters in Tempera, and it is believed she was the first artist to exhibit a true fresco with the Royal Academy in 1926. On the recommendation of Sarah Purser, Lawrenson was commissioned to create a fresco at the Franciscan Friary in Athlone, and she was later engaged for a fresco at the Priest's House at Uckfield, Surrey. Rev. A. Milton described her as "very painstaking and humble about her work." The fresco in Athlone was thought to be the first fresco in Ireland, and she claimed it would last 4000 years. Unfortunately, by 1965 the fresco was in poor repair and was replaced with a mosaic during the reordering of the church.

Brighton and Hove Museum and Art Gallery and Bradford Art Gallery hold examples of her work.
