= James Knox-Gore =

Anglo-Irish politician (died 1818)

James Knox-Gore (15 March 1775 – 21 October 1818) was an Anglo-Irish politician.

Born James Knox, he was the Member of Parliament for Taghmon in the Irish House of Commons between 1798 and the constituency's disenfranchisement under the Acts of Union 1800.

On 19 January 1800 he married Lady Maria Louisa Gore, daughter of Arthur Gore, 2nd Earl of Arran, and assumed the additional surname of Gore. Their son, Francis Knox-Gore, was created a baronet in 1868.

Parliament of Ireland
Preceded by Charles McDonnell; Robert Rutledge	Member of Parliament for Taghmon; 1798–1800; With: William Knott	Succeeded by Constituency disenfranchised
