= Knox-Gore baronets =

Extinct baronetcy in the Baronetage of the United Kingdom

The Knox-Gore Baronetcy, of Belleek Manor in the County of Mayo, was a title in the Baronetage of the United Kingdom. It was created on 5 December 1868 for Francis Knox-Gore, Lord Lieutenant of Sligo. The title became extinct on the death of the second Baronet in 1890.

== Knox-Gore baronets, of Belleek Manor (1868) ==
- Sir Francis Arthur Knox-Gore, 1st Baronet (1803–1873)
- Sir Charles James Knox-Gore, 2nd Baronet (1831–1890)

Coat of arms of Knox-Gore of Belleek Manor
Crest 1st, a wolf salient Or (Gore); 2nd, a falcon, close perched on a rest, Proper (Knox). Escutcheon Quarterly, 1st and 4th: Gules, a fesse between three cross-crosslets fitchee Or, all within a bordure Argent (Gore); 2nd and 3rd, Gules, a falcon rising Or, within an orle waved on the outer side and engrailed on the inner side Argent; a crescent for difference (Knox). Motto In hoc signo vinces
