= Dolmen of the Four Maols =

- Dolmain na gCeithre Maol (Irish)
- Clogbogle; Ballina Portal Tomb; Table of the Giants
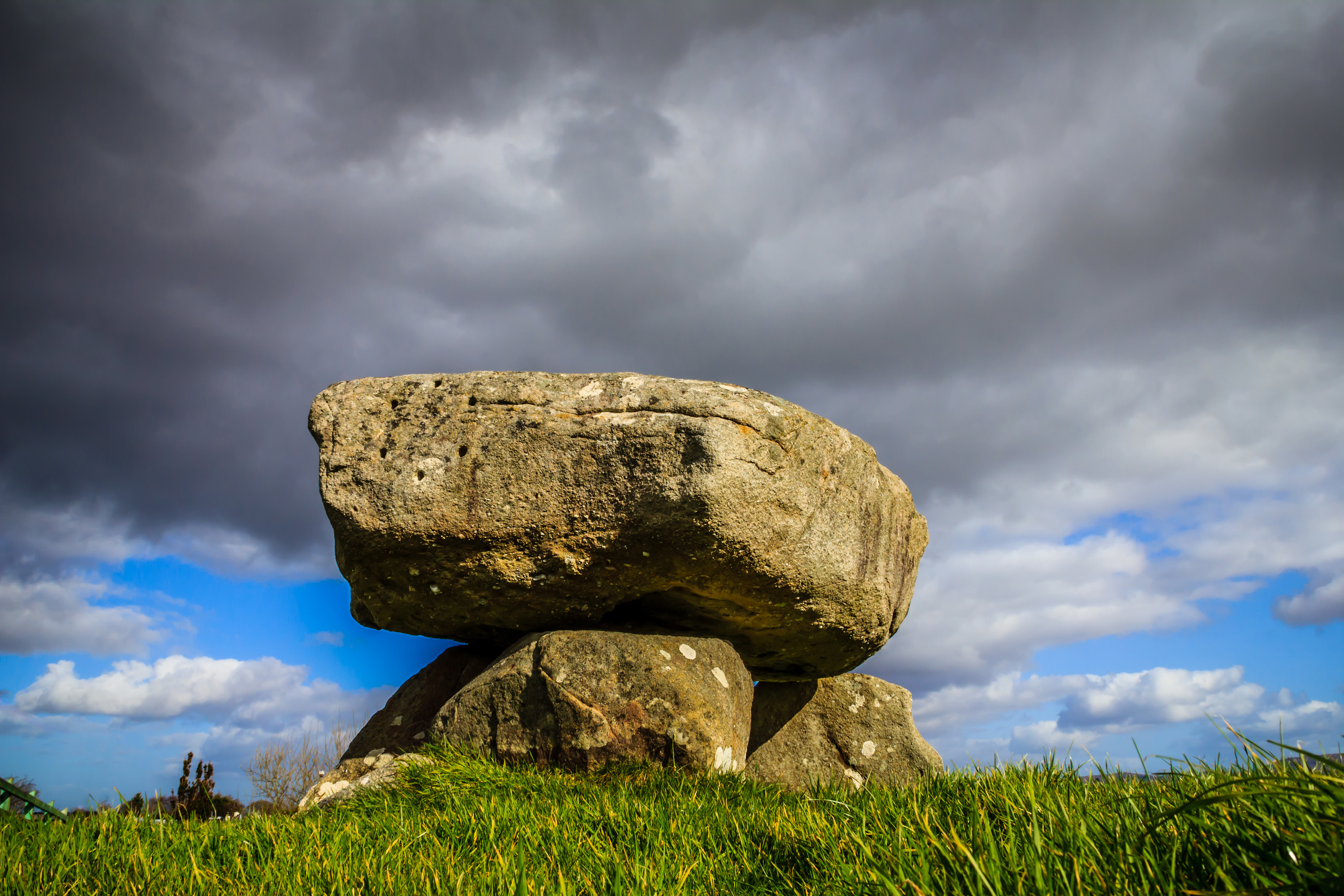

- Location within Ireland
- 54.107036°N 9.165794°W
- Type: cist
- Location: Primrose Hill, Ballina, County Mayo, Ireland

History
- Built: c. 2000 BC

Site notes
- Elevation: 19 m (62 ft)
- Height: 1.28 m (4 ft 2 in)
- Owner: Office of Public Works

National monument of Ireland
- Official name: Ballina Portal Tomb
- Reference no.: 145

The Dolmen of the Four Maols is a cist and National Monument located in County Mayo, Ireland.

== Location ==
The Dolmen of the Four Maols is located on Primrose Hill overlooking the River Moy, southwest of Ballina, outside the Road Safety Authority office.

== History ==
This cist was erected c. 2000 BC.

According to Irish legend, in the early 7th century Guaire Aidne mac Colmáin was King of Connacht. The rightful king, Cellach of Killala, had become a priest and later bishop of Kilmoremoy (Ballina). Four of Guaire Aidne's brothers murdered him; they are known as the four Maols from the Irish word maol, "bald", referring to their tonsures – they were students of Cellach's (Mael Mac Deoraidh, Maelcroin, Maeldalua, and Maelseanaigh). The four Maols were quartered at Ardnaree and then, supposedly, buried on Primrose Hill under the Dolmen of the Four Maols.

== Description ==
The massive capstone rests on three stones forming three sides of the square chamber. A fourth stone (probably the fourth side) lies nearby.
