= Sir Francis Knox-Gore, 1st Baronet =

Sir Francis Knox-Gore, 1st Baronet (1803 – 25 May 1873) was an Anglo-Irish baronet.

Knox-Gore was the son of James Knox-Gore and Lady Maria Louisa Gore, daughter of Arthur Gore, 2nd Earl of Arran. He was educated at Eton College and Trinity College Dublin. Knox-Gore was appointed Lord Lieutenant of Sligo on 5 December 1831. In 1840 he served as High Sheriff of Mayo. On 5 December 1868 he was created a baronet, of Belleek Manor in the Baronetage of the United Kingdom. He gained the rank of Colonel in the Sligo Rifle Regiment of Militia.

He married Sarah Knox was succeeded in his title by his eldest son, Charles.

Honorary titles
New title	Lord Lieutenant of Sligo; 1831–1873	Succeeded by Sir Robert Gore-Booth, Bt
Baronetage of the United Kingdom
New title	Baronet (of Belleek Manor); 1868–1873	Succeeded by Charles Knox-Gore
