= Cellach of Killala =

Supposed Bishop of Killala in Ireland

Cellach of Killala (fl. mid-6th century) is supposed to be an early Bishop of Killala, in Ireland.

Cellach appears among the saints of the Uí Fiachrach in Genealogiae Regum et Sanctorum Hiberniae, where Walsh suggests he may have been the Cellan Ua Fiachrach who appears under 1 May. It is not certain if he ever existed, as the only source, Betha Chellaig, is a much later pseudo-historical account found in Leabhar Breac.

The account states he was the eldest son of Eogan Bel, King of Connacht, was taught by Ciarán of Clonmacnoise. Ciarán made him a monk, and Cellach stayed with him until Eogan Bel was killed in the battle of Slicech (Sligo) against the northern Uí Néill, dated at 543, 546 or 547. He succeeded his father but under a curse from Ciarán, who foretold a dire fate.

Cellach was eventually ousted and returned to Ciarán, with whom he remained until elevated to bishop of Killala in the reign of Tuathal Maelgarb. He later fled to a hermitage on Lough Conn, County Mayo. He was said to have been murdered by Guaire Aidhne, who had him killed by four of his students who dumped his body in a hollow tree. Cellach's brother, Muiredach, is said to have avenged his death, and the four murderers buried under the Dolmen of the Four Maols, outside Ballina.

The account has many chronological discrepancies.
