= Belleek Castle =

Manor house in County Mayo, Ireland

Coordinates: 54.1333°N 9.1449°W

Belleek Castle, originally known as Belleek Manor, is a 19th-century manor house in Ballina, County Mayo in Ireland. Now operated as a hotel, the house was built between 1825 and 1831 in a neo-Gothic style. The 10-room hotel has a museum in its basement containing what is reputed to be Grace O'Malley's bed. It also has a collection of fossils and armoury and a bar named for the Spanish Armada in Ireland. Several structures on the site, including the manor house itself, a nearby mausoleum and 19th-century entrance archway, are included in the Record of Protected Structures maintained by Mayo County Council.

== History ==
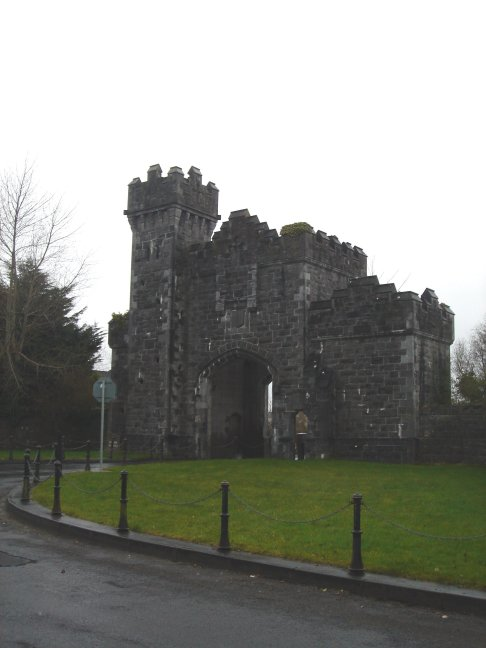
The gate tower to Belleek Manor was built in the 1870s to designs by James Franklin Fuller

The manor house is reputedly built on the site of a 13th-century tower house. This structure was the ancestral home of the Earls of Arran, before passing to the Baronets of Belleek Manor.

The current building, known as Belleek Manor, was built by Sir Francis Knox-Gore, 1st Baronet between 1825 and 1831. While the design of the house is traditionally associated with the Irish architect John Benjamin Keane, some sources suggest that Frederick Darley Junior was also a "likely design source". It is a five-bay two-storey (over basement) country house with some Tudor-style and some Gothic-style design elements.

The house and its estate stayed in the Knox-Gore family until 1942 when rising costs made them sell. Between 1942 and 1961, the estate changed hands multiple times, eventually ending up in the possession of Mayo County Council in 1961. It was bought in the 1960s by Marshall Doran, a retired sailor, raconteur and adventurer. After he bought Belleek Manor, he set about making it into a home for himself and his family and his collection of medieval artefacts. The house was converted, by the Doran family, into a hotel that is now known as Belleek Castle.

== See also ==
- List of hotels in Ireland
