= Hiram (name) =

Hiram (/ˈhaɪrəm/ HY-rəm; Phoenician "benevolent brother", Hebrew חִירָם "high-born", Standard Hebrew Ḥiram, Tiberian Hebrew Ḥîrām) is a biblical given name referring to Phoenician kings.

== People ==
- Hiram I, king of Tyre, 980–947 BC
- Hiram II, king of Tyre, 739–730 BC
- Hiram Abiff, an appellation in Masonic myth applied to the "skillful man" whom Hiram the king of Tyre sent to make the furnishings of Solomon's temple. 966 BC
- Hiram Abas (1932–1990), official in the National Intelligence Organization of Turkey
- Hiram Abrams (1878–1926), American movie mogul and one of the first presidents of Paramount Pictures
- Hiram G. Andrews (1876–1968), speaker of the Pennsylvania House of Representatives
- Hiram Barak (born 1979), General of the Israel Defense Forces
- Hiram I. Bearss (1875–1938), Marine Corps officer and recipient of the Medal of Honor
- Hiram Bell, several people with this name
- Hiram Bennet (1826–1914), Congressional delegate from the Territory of Colorado and Colorado Secretary of State
- Hiram Berdan (1824–1893), American engineer and Army officer, creator of the Berdan rifle
- Hiram Berry (disambiguation), several people with this name
- Hiram Bingham (disambiguation), several people with this name
- Hiram Bithorn (1916–1951), first Puerto Rican Major League Baseball player
- Hiram Blanchard (1820–1874), Canadian lawyer and politician, first premier of Nova Scotia
- Hiram Boateng (born 1996), English association football player
- Hiram Abiff Boaz (1866–1962), president of Polytechnic College from 1902 to 1911, and of Southern Methodist University from 1920 to 1922
- Hiram Bocachica (born 1976), Puerto Rican baseball player
- Hiram Bond (1838–1906), American lawyer and banker
- Hiram N. Breed (1809–1893), American cordwainer and politician
- Hiram J. Brendlinger (1824–1894), American politician and mayor of Denver
- Hiram Bullock (1955–2008), American jazz musician
- Hiram Burgos (born 1987), Puerto Rican baseball player
- Hiram R. Burton (1841–1927), American physician and politician
- Hiram Calvin (1841–1932), Canadian businessman and politician
- Hiram Cancio (1920–2008), judge of the US District Court for the District of Puerto Rico
- Hiram Caton (1936–2010), Australian professor of politics and history
- Hiram Chittenden (1858–1917), American historian
- Hiram Cleaver (1801–1877), American politician from Pennsylvania
- Hiram Codd (1838–1887), English engineer and inventor
- Hiram Cody, Canadian clergyman and novelist
- Hiram Cronk (1800–1905), American soldier, last surviving veteran of the War of 1812 at the time of his death
- Hiram Corson (1828–1911), American professor of literature
- Hiram Cox (1760–1799), English diplomat, serving in Bangladesh and Burma
- Hiram Davison (1894–1874), Canadian Air Force officer
- Hiram Deats (1810–1887), American businessman
- Hiram Edmund Deats (1870–1963), American philatelist
- Hiram Denio (1799–1871), American lawyer and politician, Chief Judge of the New York Court of Appeals
- Hiram Drache (1924–2020), American writer on agriculture, and historian-in-residence at Concordia College, Minnesota
- Hiram Edson (1806–1882), American pioneer of the Seventh-day Adventist Church, known for introducing the sanctuary doctrine to the church
- Hiram Eugene (born 1980), American football player (safety)
- Hiram Evans (disambiguation), several people with this name
- Hiram Everest (1830–1913), American businessman and farmer
- Hiram Fairchild (1845–1925), American politician and legislator
- Hiram Leong Fong (born Yau Leong Fong; 1906–2004), first Asian-American to serve in the US Senate
- Hiram Ford (1884–1969), US federal judge
- H. Robert Fowler (born Hiram Robert Fowler; 1851–1926), US Representative from Illinois
- Hiram Fuller (also known as: Hesham Ali Salem; born 1981), Libyan basketball player
- Hiram Fuller (journalist) (1814–1880)
- Hiram Gardner (1800–1874), American lawyer and politician
- Hiram Gill (1866–1919), first US mayor to undergo a recall election
- Ulysses S. Grant (born Hiram Ulysses Grant; 1822–1885), 18th President of the United States
- Hiram Gray (1801–1890), American lawyer and politician
- Hiram Griswold (1807–1881), American politician and lawyer from Ohio
- Hiram E. Hadley (1854–1929), justice of the Washington Supreme Court
- Hiram Halle (1867–1944), American businessman
- Hiram Hiller, Jr. (1867–1921), American physician, medical missionary, explorer, and ethnographer
- Hiram Hulse (1868–1938), second Bishop of the Diocese of Cuba in The Episcopal Church
- Hiram P. Hunt (1796–1865), American politician
- Hiram Hunter (1874–1966), New Zealand politician and trade unionist
- Hiram Hutchinson (1808–1869), American industrialist
- Hiram Hyde (1817–1907), Canadian stagecoach operator and political figure in Nova Scotia
- Hiram Imus, father of Hiram Imus, jr.
- Hiram Imus, jr. (1804–1876), American politician
- Hiram Johnson (1866–1945), American progressive and later isolationist politician and governor
- Hiram Kahanawai (1835–1874), Hawaiian high chief and husband of Princess Poʻomaikelani
- Hiram Keller (born Hiram Keller Undercofler, Jr.; 1944–1997), American stage and film actor
- Hiram Kennedy (1852–1913), American physician and politician
- Hiram Kimball#Sarah Granger Kimball (died 1863), American Mormon pioneer
- Hiram Knowles (1834–1911), US federal judge
- Hiram Leavitt (1824–1901), early American settler, innkeeper, and judge, namesake of features such as ''Leavitt Peak, Leavitt Meadow, Leavitt Creek and Leavitt Lake
- Hiram Lowry (1843–1924), Chinese educator and Methodist clergyman
- Hiram Mather (1796–1868), American lawyer and politician
- Hiram Maxim (1840–1916), English creator of the Maxim gun
- Hiram E. McCallum (1899–1989), mayor of Toronto from 1948 to 1951
- Hiram McCreary, Canadian politician
- Hiram McCullough (1813–1885), US Congressman
- Hiram Z. Mendow (1894-2001), Al Capone's lawyer during his trial
- Hiram Messenger, several people with this name
- Hiram Mier (born 1989), Mexican association football player
- Hiram Frederick Moody, III, also known as Rick Moody, American author
- Hiram Monserrate (born 1967), expelled member of the New York State Senate
- Hiram N. Moulton (1818–1899), mayor of Madison, Wisconsin
- Hiram Norton (c. 1799–1875), merchant and political figure in Upper Canada
- Hiram Page (1800–1852), American, early member of the Latter Day Saint movement
- Hiram Paulding (1797–1878), American Navy officer
- Hiram Powers (1805–1873), American sculptor
- Hiram Pratt (1800–1840), mayor of Buffalo, New York
- Hiram Price (1814–1901), American businessman
- Hiram F. Reynolds (1854–1938), American minister and general superintendent in the Church of the Nazarene
- Hiram Revels (1827–1901), first African-American to serve in the US Senate
- Hiram Richmond (1810–1885), Pennsylvanian member of the US House of Representatives
- Hiram Torres Rigual (1922–2006), Puerto Rican Superior Court judge
- Hiram Runnels (1796–1857), American politician
- Hiram Scofield (1830–1906), American lawyer and Union Army officer
- Hiram Sherman (1908–1989), American actor
- Hiram Sibley (1807–1888), American industrialist and philanthropist
- Hiram Sinsabaugh (c. 1832–1892), American banker and Methodist Episcopal minister
- Hiram Smith Williams (1833–1921), Florida pioneer
- Hiram Stevens (disambiguation), several people with this name
- Hiland Stickney (born Hiram Stickney; 1867–1911), American football player (tackle) and football coach
- Hiram Straight (1814–1897), American farmer and politician
- Hiram Tua (born 1983), ring name of Puerto Rican wrestler Hiram Mulero
- Hiram Tuttle (disambiguation), several people with this name
- Hiram K. Undercofler (1916–1998), justice of the Supreme Court of Georgia
- Hiram A. Unruh (1845–1916), American soldier and politician
- Hiram Walbridge (1821–1870), American politician
- Hiram Walden (1800–1880), American politician
- Hiram Walker (1816–1899), American grocer and distiller, and the eponym of the famous distillery in Windsor, Ontario, Canada
- Hiram Ward (1923–2002), US federal judge
- Hiram Widener, Jr. (1923–2007), US federal judge
- Hiram Wilkinson (disambiguation), several people with this name
- Hank Williams (born Hiram King Williams; 1923–1953), American country music singer
- Hiram D. Williams (1917–2003), American painter and professor of art
- Hiram James Williamson, Jr. (1810–1836), Sergeant Major, defender of the Alamo
- Hiram Wilson (1803–1864), American anti-slavery abolitionist
- Hiram V. Willson (1808–1866), US federal judge
- Hiram A. Wright (1823–1855), American educator and politician
- Hiram Young (c. 1812–1882), African-American wagon manufacturer and entrepreneur

== Fictional people ==
- Hiram Abiff, a character in Masonic lore
- Dr. Hiram Baker, doctor in Walnut Grove, a character in the television series Little House on the Prairie
- Hiram Burrows, a character from the video game Dishonored
- Lieutenant Hiram Coffey, a character in the movie The Abyss
- Hiram "Country" Cowfreak, a recurring character in the underground comic The Fabulous Furry Freak Brothers
- Hiram Flagston, a character in the comic Hi and Lois by Greg and Brian Walker
- Hiram Grewgious, a character in the novel The Mystery of Edwin Drood by Charles Dickens
- Hiram Gummer, the anti-hero of Tremors 4: The Legend Begins
- Hiram Gunderson, a recurring character in the HBO drama television series Six Feet Under
- Hiram "Brains" Hackenbacker, aka Brains in the television series Thunderbirds
- Hiram Hillburn, the fictional friend of Emmett Till in the young adult novel Mississippi Trial, 1955
- Hiram Holliday, a character created by Paul Gallico in an eponymous novel and television series
- Hiram Lodge, a fictional character in Archie Comics and television series Riverdale
- Hiram McDaniels, a character in Welcome to Night Vale
- Hiram Patterson, a media mogul in the science fiction novel The Light of Other Days by Arthur C. Clarke and Stephen Baxter
- Sebastian Hiram Shaw, a supervillain by Marvel Comics
- Hiram Walker, superhuman protagonist in the novel The Water Dancer by Ta-Nehisi Coates
- Hiram Wolfe the adoptive grandfather wolf of Heffer Wolfe from the television series Rocko's Modern Life
- Hiram Worchester, a character from the book series Wild Cards

== See also ==
- Hiram (disambiguation) for other uses of Hiram

=== Similar spelling ===
- Hyrum Smith, several people with this name
