= Bingham =

Bingham may refer to:

== Places ==
=== Australia ===
- Bingham, Queensland, former name of the town of River Heads

=== United Kingdom ===
- Bingham, Nottinghamshire, a town in England
- Bingham (wapentake), a historic district of Nottinghamshire, England
- Bingham, Edinburgh, a suburb in Scotland

=== United States ===
- Bingham, Georgia
- Bingham County, Idaho
- Bingham, Illinois
- Bingham, Maine, a town
  - Bingham (CDP), Maine, a census-designated place
- Bingham Township, Clinton County, Michigan
- Bingham Township, Huron County, Michigan
- Bingham Township, Leelanau County, Michigan
- Bingham, Nebraska
- Bingham Township, Potter County, Pennsylvania
- Bingham, South Carolina
- Bingham, Utah
  - Bingham Canyon, Utah
    - Bingham Canyon Mine
- Bingham, West Virginia

=== Elsewhere ===
- Bingham (crater), on the Moon
- Bingham Glacier, Antarctica
- Bingham Peak, Antarctica

== Other uses ==
- Bingham (surname)
- Bingham McCutchen, a former law firm
- Bingham plastic, a non-Newtonian material

== See also ==
- Bigham
- Binghamton (disambiguation)
- Brigham (disambiguation)
