= Peregrine Bingham =

Peregrine Bingham may refer to

- Peregrine Bingham the elder (1754–1826), English biographer and poet
- Peregrine Bingham the younger (1788–1864), English legal writer
