= Hiram Bingham =

Hiram Bingham may refer to:

- Hiram Bingham I (1789–1869), American missionary to the Kingdom of Hawai'i
- Hiram Bingham II (1831–1908), son of Hiram Bingham I, also a missionary to the Kingdom of Hawai'i
- Hiram Bingham III (1875–1956), explorer and U.S. Senator from Connecticut
- Hiram Bingham IV (1903–1988), U.S. Vice Consul in Marseille, France during World War II who rescued Jews from the Holocaust
- Harry Payne Bingham (1887–1955), American financier and philanthropist

== See also ==
- Hiram (disambiguation)
- Bingham (surname)
- Bingham (disambiguation)
