= Senator Kennedy =

Senator Kennedy may refer to:

== Members of the United States Senate ==
- Anthony Kennedy (Maryland politician) (1810–1892), U.S. Senator from Maryland from 1857 to 1863
- John F. Kennedy (1917–1963), U.S. Senator from Massachusetts from 1953 to 1960
- John Kennedy (Louisiana politician) (born 1951), U.S. Senator from Louisiana since 2017
- Robert F. Kennedy (1925–1968), U.S. Senator from New York from 1965 to 1968
- Ted Kennedy (1932–2009), U.S. Senator from Massachusetts from 1962 to 2009

== United States state senate members ==
- Alfred J. Kennedy (1878–1944), New York State Senate
- Ambrose Jerome Kennedy (1893–1950), Maryland State Senate
- Andrew Kennedy (American politician) (1810–1847), Indiana State Senate
- Brian T. Kennedy (1934–2012), New Jersey State Senate
- Carlisle Kennedy (fl. 2020s), South Carolina State Senate
- Craig Kennedy (politician) (born 1951), South Dakota State Senate
- Edward J. Kennedy (1951–2025), Massachusetts State Senate
- Edward M. Kennedy Jr. (born 1961), Connecticut State Senate
- Gene Kennedy (politician) (born 1927), Iowa State Senate
- George N. Kennedy (1822–1901), New York State Senate
- Harry Kennedy (politician) (born 1952), Missouri State Senate
- Hiram Raleigh Kennedy (1852–1913), Alabama State Senate
- Joe Kennedy (Georgia politician) (1930–1997), Georgia State Senate
- Martin J. Kennedy (1892–1955), New York State Senate
- Mike Kennedy (born 1969), Utah State Senate
- P. J. Kennedy (1858–1929), Massachusetts State Senate
- Robyn Kennedy (fl. 2020s), Massachusetts State Senate
- Sandra Kennedy (born 1957), Arizona State Senate
- Thomas Kennedy (Maryland politician) (1776–1832), Maryland State Senate
- Thomas C. Kennedy (1914–2006), Nebraska State Senate
- Thomas P. Kennedy (1951–2015), Massachusetts State Senate
- Tim Kennedy (politician) (born 1976), New York State Senate
- William Kennedy (Connecticut politician) (1854–1918), Connecticut State Senate
- William Kennedy (Wisconsin politician) (1841–1910), Wisconsin State Senate

== Members of the Northern Irish Senate ==
- Norman Kennedy (politician), Northern Irish Senator from 1965 to 1973

== See also ==
- John R. Kennaday (1830–1884), American lawyer and politician from New York
