= Pterotyphis pinnatus =

Scientific classification
- Kingdom: Animalia
- Phylum: Mollusca
- Class: Gastropoda
- Subclass: Caenogastropoda
- Order: Neogastropoda
- Family: Muricidae
- Genus: Pterotyphis
- Species: P. pinnatus

Binomial name
- Pterotyphis pinnatus (Broderip, 1833)

Synonyms
- Typhis fordi Pilsbry, 1943; Typhis pinnatus Broderip, 1833

Species of gastropod

Pterotyphis pinnatus is a species of sea snail, a marine gastropod mollusk in the family Muricidae, the murex snails or rock snails.
