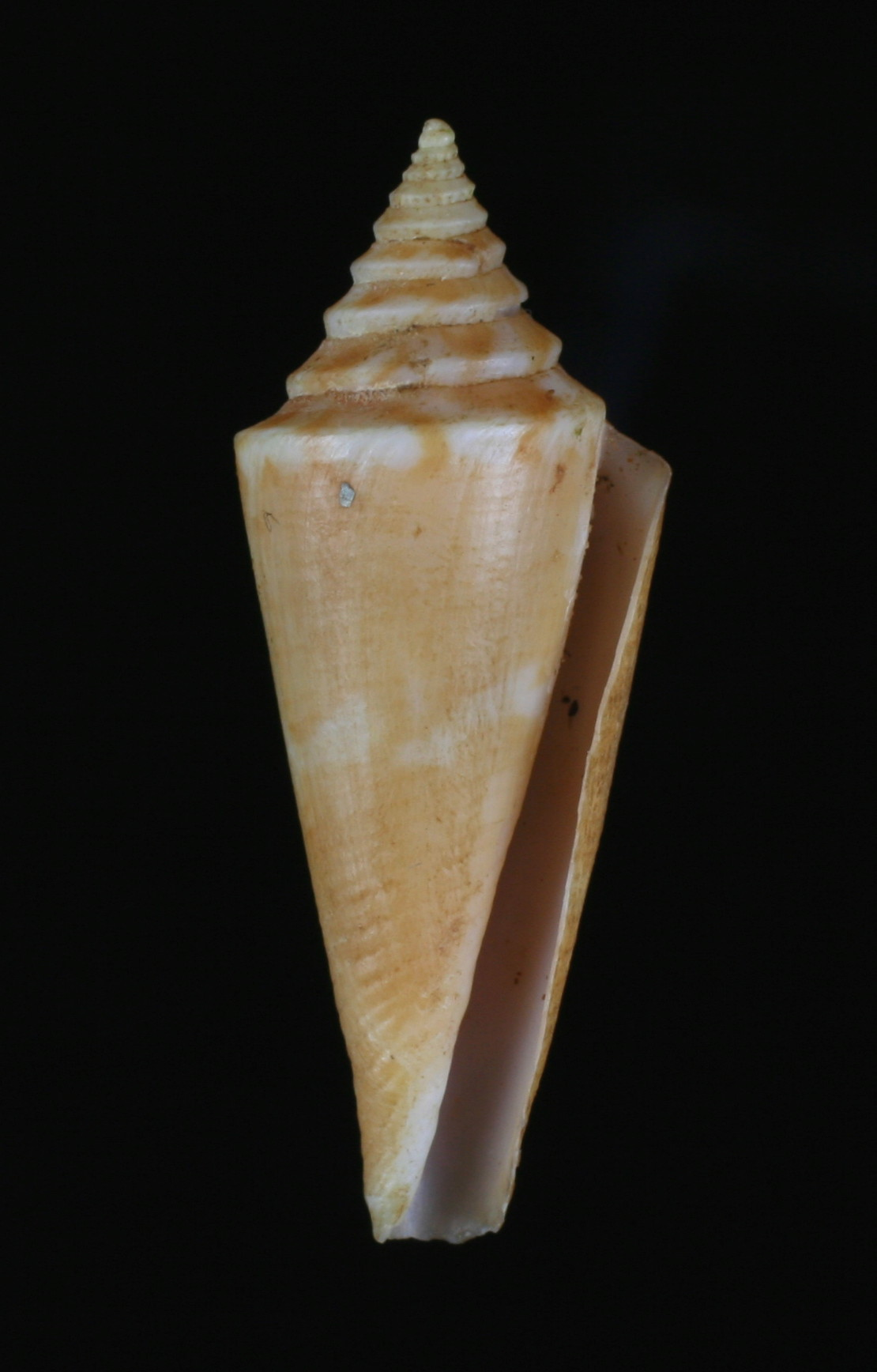
- Apertural view of shell of Conus nybakkeni (Tenorio, Tucker & Chaney, 2012), collected at Bahia de Los Angeles, Mexico, measuring 23.8mm in length

Scientific classification
- Kingdom: Animalia
- Phylum: Mollusca
- Class: Gastropoda
- Subclass: Caenogastropoda
- Order: Neogastropoda
- Superfamily: Conoidea
- Family: Conidae
- Genus: Conus
- Species: C. nybakkeni

Binomial name
- Conus nybakkeni (Tenorio, Tucker & Chaney, 2012)

Synonyms
- Conus (Dauciconus) nybakkeni (Tenorio, Tucker & Chaney, 2012) · accepted, alternate representation; Gradiconus nybakkeni Tenorio, Tucker & Chaney, 2012 (original combination)

= Conus nybakkeni =

Species of sea snail

Conus nybakkeni is a species of sea snail, a marine gastropod mollusc in the family Conidae, the cone snails and their allies.

Like all species within the genus Conus, these marine snails are predatory and venomous. They are capable of stinging humans, therefore live ones should be handled carefully or not at all.

== Description ==
A narrowly conical shell with angular shoulders, an elevated and slightly scalariform spire, and a body whorl with flat sides; shell shape is not known to vary in this species. The protoconch is paucispiral with two whorls, and fluted nodules are present on the shoulders of the earliest teleoconch whorls. The sutural ramps are flat and lack cords. The color consists of light golden brown with white blotches in a spiral pattern. The aperture is blue-white to lavender in color. The protoconch and early whorls are white. The shell is similar in shape to juvenile Conus scalaris. Its length is between 12.8 and 50.9 mm.

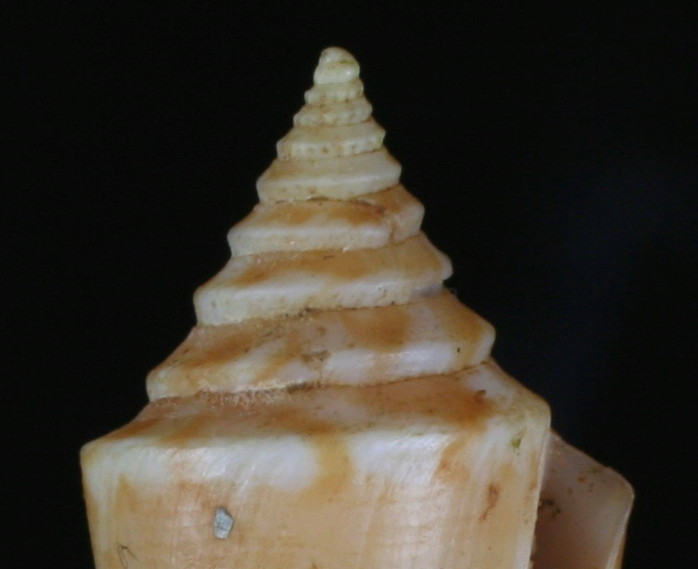
Protoconch view of Conus nybakkeni

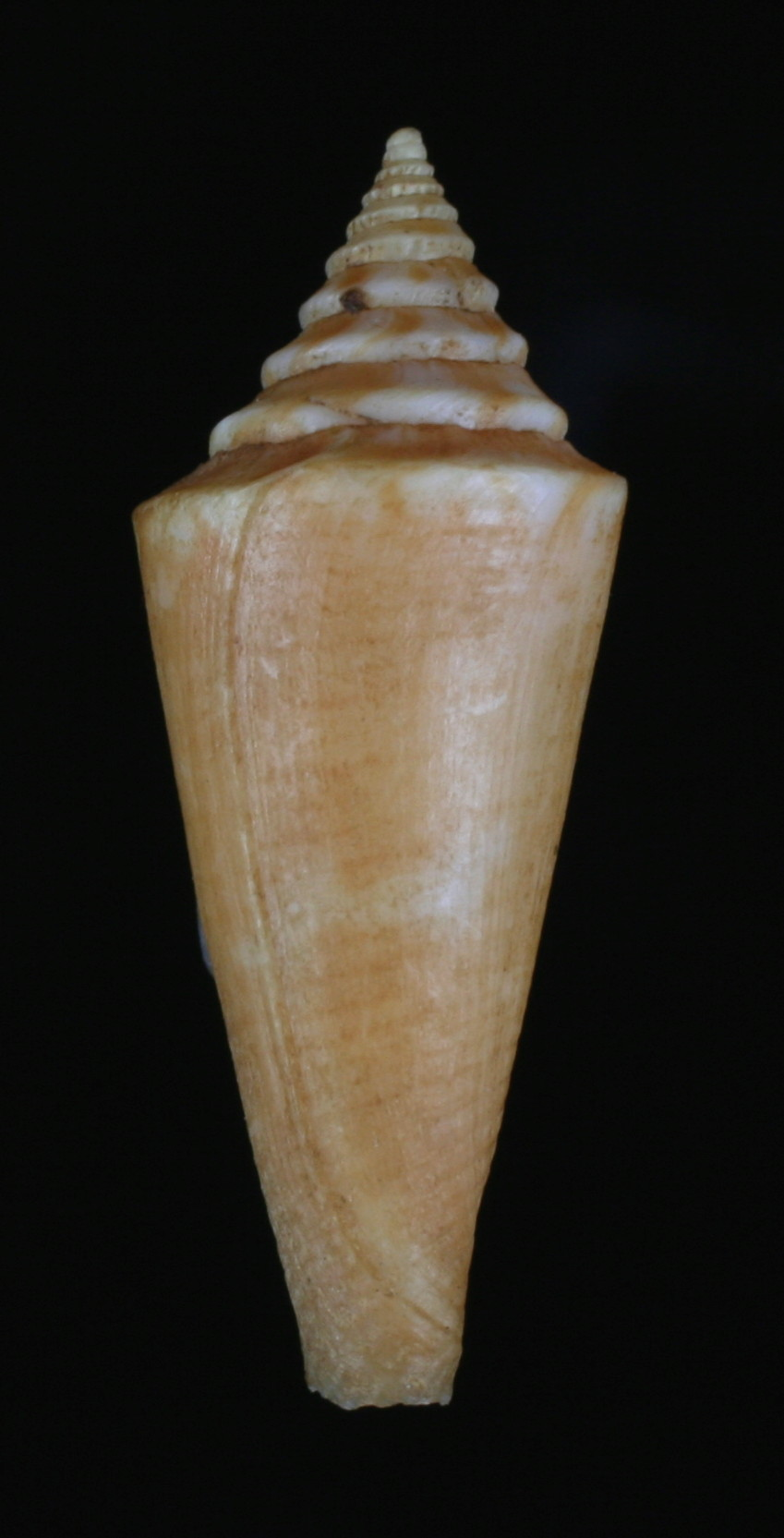
Abapertural view of shell of Conus nybakkeni

== Distribution ==
This species has only been found in deep water between 47 and 60 meters in Bahia de Los Angeles and Bahia los Fragiles, Baja California Sur, Mexico.
