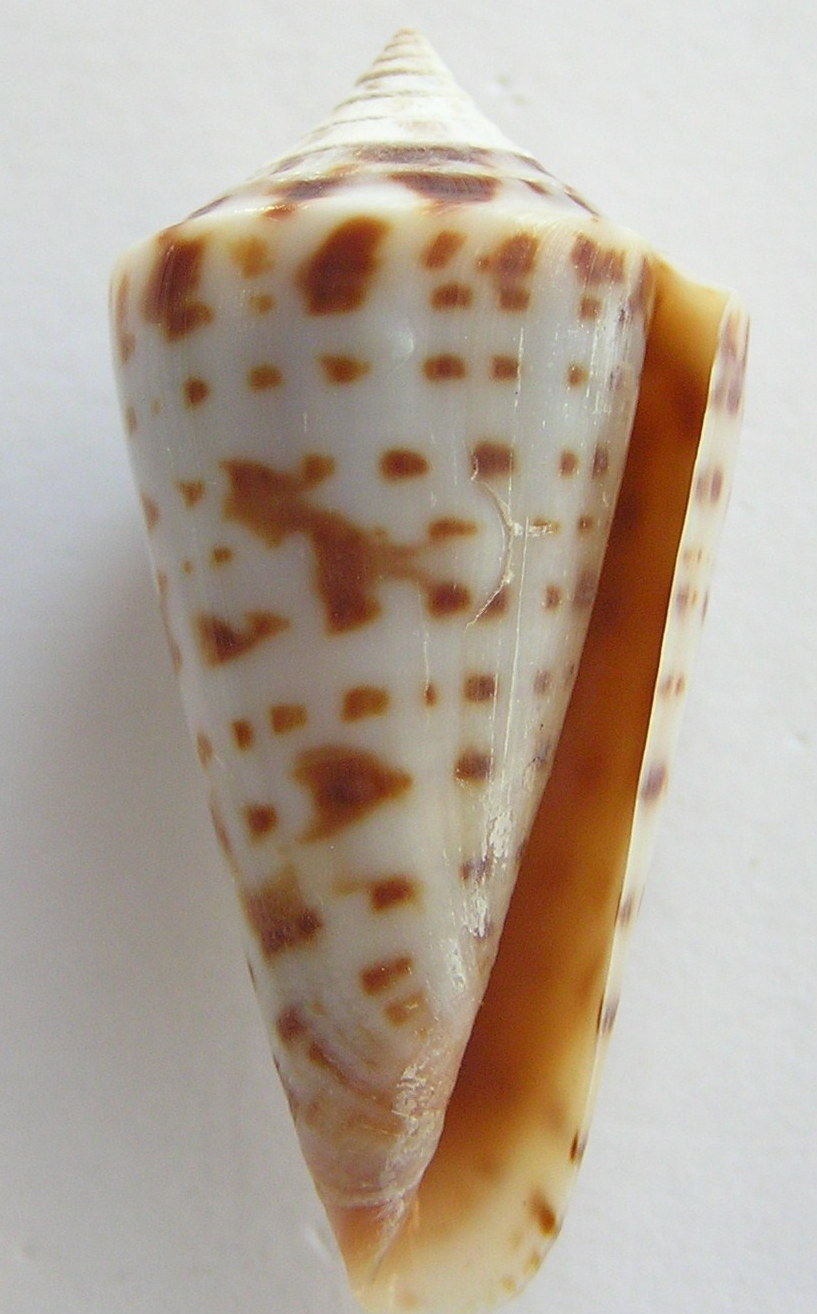
- Apertural view of a shell of Conus gradatus

Scientific classification
- Kingdom: Animalia
- Phylum: Mollusca
- Class: Gastropoda
- Subclass: Caenogastropoda
- Order: Neogastropoda
- Superfamily: Conoidea
- Family: Conidae
- Genus: Conus
- Species: C. gradatus

Binomial name
- Conus gradatus W. Wood, 1828

Synonyms
- Conus (Dauciconus) gradatus W. Wood, 1828 · accepted, alternate representation; Gradiconus gradatus (W. Wood, 1828)

= Conus gradatus =

Species of sea snail

Conus gradatus, common name the graduated cone, is a species of sea snail, a marine gastropod mollusk in the family Conidae, the cone snails, cone shells or cones.

These snails are predatory and venomous. They are capable of stinging humans.

The subspecies Conus gradatus thaanumi Schwengel, 1955i s a synonym of Conus recurvus Broderip, 1833

== Description ==
The size of the shell varies between 25 mm and 60 mm.

== Distribution ==
Eastern Pacific Ocean. This marine species occurs in the Gulf of California, Western Mexico to Peru.
