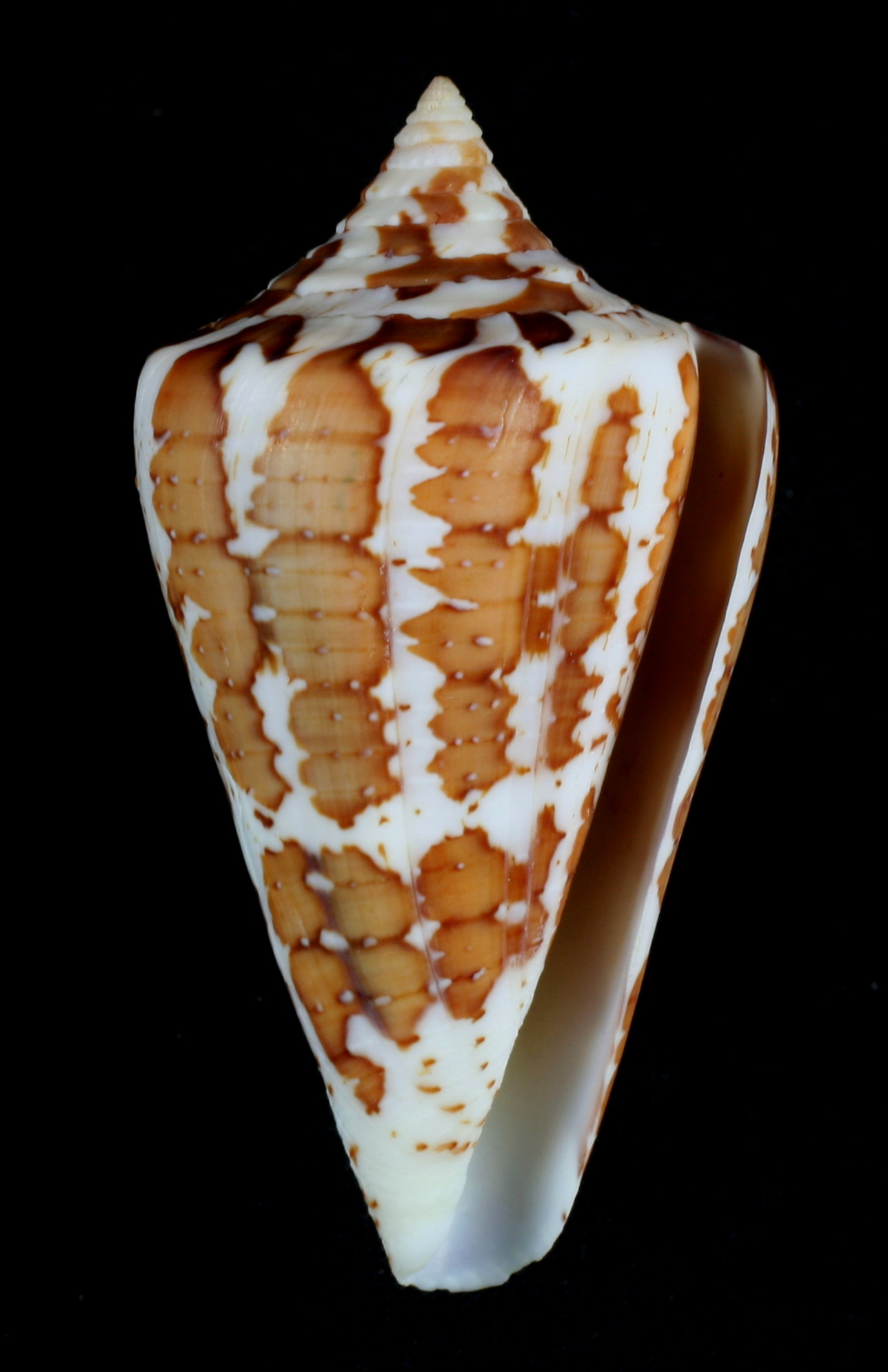
- Apertural view of shell of Conus archon Broderip, 1833, measuring 64.4 mm in height, dredged at 290 ft. off Danzante Island, in Mexico.

Conservation status
- Least Concern (IUCN 3.1)

Scientific classification
- Kingdom: Animalia
- Phylum: Mollusca
- Class: Gastropoda
- Subclass: Caenogastropoda
- Order: Neogastropoda
- Superfamily: Conoidea
- Family: Conidae
- Genus: Conus
- Species: C. archon

Binomial name
- Conus archon Broderip, 1833

Synonyms
- Conus (Stephanoconus) archon Broderip, 1833 · accepted, alternate representation; Protoconus archon (Broderip, 1833); Tenorioconus archon (Broderip, 1833)

= Conus archon =

Species of sea snail

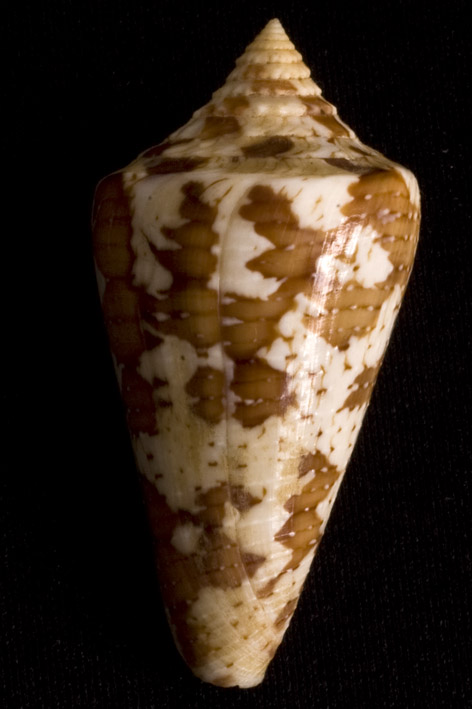
Abapertural view of shell of Conus archon Broderip, 1833

Conus archon, common name the magistrate cone, is a species of sea snail, a marine gastropod mollusk in the family Conidae, the cone snails and their allies.

Like all species within the genus Conus, these snails are predatory and venomous. They are capable of stinging humans, therefore live ones should be handled carefully or not at all.

== Description ==
The spire is concavely elevated, not coronated. The body whorl is smooth and slightly striate below. The shell is irregularly marbled with chestnut and white, with equidistant chestnut revolving lines bearing white spots. The length of the shell varies between 38 mm and 70 mm

== Distribution ==
This marine species occurs off the West Coast of Mexico and Central America (the Gulf of California to Panama)
