= 8th Louisiana Colored Infantry Regiment =

- Active: 1863–1864
- Country: United States of America
- Allegiance: USA
- Branch: Union Army
- Type: Infantry
- Engagements: American Civil War: Battle of Milliken's Bend; Skirmish at Goodrich's Landing, La., June 1863; Battle of Yazoo City

Commanders
- Notable commanders: Hiram Scofield

The 8th Louisiana Colored Infantry Regiment was an infantry regiment in the Union Army during the American Civil War. It was composed primarily of freed or escaped slaves from Louisiana's plantations and was commanded by white officers.

== Organization ==
In the spring of 1863, Col. Hiram Scofield, a veteran officer in the 2nd Iowa Infantry, organized the 8th Louisiana Infantry at Lake Providence, Louisiana. The new regiment was mustered into service on May 5.

== Vicksburg Campaign ==
During the Vicksburg Campaign, the regiment was attached to the African Brigade, District of Northeast Louisiana. The brigade was led successively by Col. Isaac F. Shepard (who was under arrest at the time of the Battle of Milliken's Bend) and then Hermann Lieb (wounded June 7, 1863). Finally, Lt. Col. Charles J. Paine led the brigade as the campaign wound down. Returning to Lake Providence, the regiment was engaged in a minor battle on June 9 against a small Confederate force composed of the 13th Texas Infantry Regiment and the 13th Louisiana Cavalry Battalion.

The 8th Louisiana was then on routine garrison duty at Vicksburg, Mississippi, until the late winter of 1864. Then, it participated in the expedition up the Yazoo River from February 1 until March 8, and participated in the capture of Yazoo City, Mississippi, on February 4.

== U.S. Colored Troops ==
The regiment subsequently returned to Vicksburg, where it was reorganized as the 47th Regiment Infantry, United States Colored Troops on March 11.

== See also ==
- List of Louisiana Union Civil War units
