= Joel Cooper =

Joel Cooper may refer to:

- Joel Cooper (footballer) (born 1996), Northern Irish professional football player for Oxford United
- Joel Cooper, a researcher in cognitive dissonance
- Joel D. Cooper (fl. from 1964), thoracic surgeon
- Joel H. Cooper (California politician) (1841–1899), California lawyer and legislator
- Joel H. Cooper (Wisconsin politician) (1821–1893), Wisconsin doctor and Free Soil legislator
