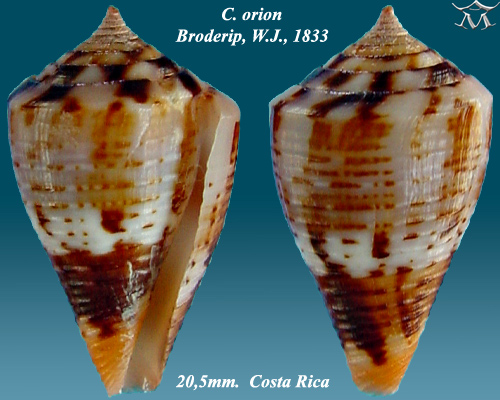
- Apertural and abapertural views of shell of Conus orion Broderip, W.J., 1833
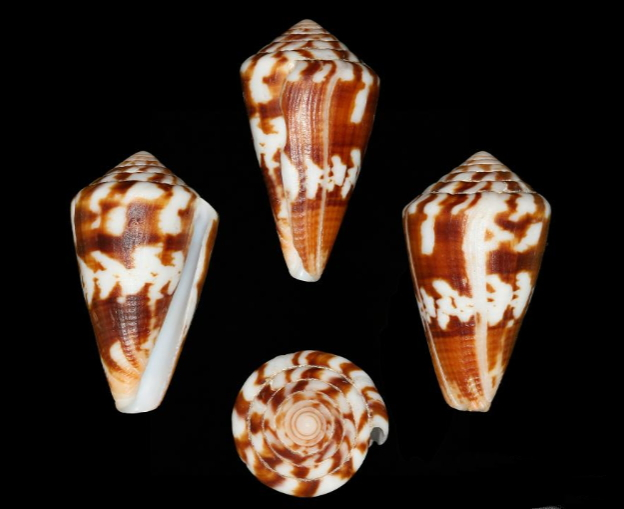

Scientific classification
- Domain: Eukaryota
- Kingdom: Animalia
- Phylum: Mollusca
- Class: Gastropoda
- Subclass: Caenogastropoda
- Order: Neogastropoda
- Superfamily: Conoidea
- Family: Conidae
- Genus: Conus
- Species: C. orion

Binomial name
- Conus orion Broderip, 1833

Synonyms
- Conus (Dauciconus) orion Broderip, 1833 · accepted, alternate representation; Conus drangai Schwengel, 1955; Poremskiconus orion (Broderip, 1833); Purpuriconus orion (Broderip, 1833)

= Conus orion =

Species of sea snail

Conus orion, common name the Orion cone, is a species of sea snail, a marine gastropod mollusk in the family Conidae, the cone snails and their allies.

Like all species within the genus Conus, these snails are predatory and venomous. They are capable of stinging humans, therefore live ones should be handled carefully or not at all.

== Description ==
The size of the shell varies between 17 mm and 32 mm. The broader shell is angular at the shoulder. The color of the shell is dark brown with maculated white bands and rather continuous revolving lines of darker brown. The spire is convex and maculated with chestnut.

== Distribution ==
This species occurs in the Pacific Ocean between Mexico and Colombia.
