= T. robustus =

T. robustus may refer to:

- Tarachodes robustus, a praying mantis species
- Trichobatrachus robustus, the hairy frog, a Central African frog species
- Tripterotyphis robustus, a sea snail species
