= Bingham (surname) =

Origin
- Region of origin: England

Bingham (/ˈbɪŋəm/ BING-əm) is a surname of English origin, ultimately deriving from the toponym of Melcombe Bingham in Dorset. The name was taken to Ireland in the 16th century, by Richard Bingham, a native of Dorset who was appointed governor of Connaught in 1584. There is another Bingham in Nottinghamshire.

People surnamed Bingham include:

== British ==
Peerage:

- Bingham Baronets, of Castlebar (created 1634)
  - Sir Henry Bingham, 1st Baronet (1573 – c. 1658)
  - Sir George Bingham, 2nd Baronet (c. 1625 – 1682)
  - Sir Henry Bingham, 3rd Baronet (died c. 1714)
  - Sir George Bingham, 4th Baronet (died c. 1730)
  - Sir John Bingham, 5th Baronet (1690–1749)
  - Sir John Bingham, 6th Baronet (1730–1750)
  - Sir Charles Bingham, 7th Baronet (1735–1799)
- Earls of Lucan (second creation (1795)
  - Charles Bingham, 1st Earl of Lucan (1735–1799)
  - Richard Bingham, 2nd Earl of Lucan (1764–1839)
  - George Bingham, 3rd Earl of Lucan (1800–1888)
  - Charles Bingham, 4th Earl of Lucan (1830–1914)
  - George Bingham, 5th Earl of Lucan (1860–1949)
  - George Bingham, 6th Earl of Lucan (1898–1964)
  - Richard John Bingham, 7th Earl of Lucan (b. 1934, missing since 1974, presumed dead – death certificate issued 2016) the infamous "Lord Lucan" who disappeared after murdering his nanny when intending to murder his wife
  - George Charles Bingham, 8th Earl of Lucan (born 1967)
- Baron Clanmorris (created 1800)
  - John Bingham, 1st Baron Clanmorris (1762–1821)
  - Charles Barry Bingham, 2nd Baron Clanmorris (1796–1829)
  - Denis Arthur Bingham, 3rd Baron Clanmorris (1808–1847)
  - John Charles Robert Bingham, 4th Baron Clanmorris (1826–1876)
  - John George Barry Bingham, 5th Baron Clanmorris (1852–1916)
  - Arthur Maurice Robert Bingham, 6th Baron Clanmorris (1879–1960)
  - John Michael Ward Bingham, 7th Baron Clanmorris (1908–1988), MI5 spy and novelist
  - Simon John Ward Bingham, 8th Baron Clanmorris (born 1937)
  - Robert Derek de Burgh Bingham (born 1942)

Law:

- Tom Bingham, Baron Bingham of Cornhill, one of the most senior judges in the United Kingdom
- Peregrine Bingham the Elder, biographer and poet
- Peregrine Bingham the Younger, English legal writer
- Lady Camilla Bingham KC (born 1970)

Mathematics and science:

- Nicholas Bingham (1945), British mathematician
- Dame Kate Bingham, bioscientist, venture capitalist and Head of UK's Vaccine Taskforce

Military:

- Arthur Bingham, Captain in the Royal Navy
- Cecil Edward Bingham, General in the British Army
- Charles Thomas Bingham (1848–1908), Irish Army officer, entomologist and naturalist in India
- Edward Bingham, Rear-Admiral of the British Royal Navy during the First World War
- Edward W. Bingham, polar explorer
- Peregrine Bingham the Elder, biographer and poet
- Richard Bingham (soldier)

Religion:

- Joseph Bingham (1668–1723), English scholar and divine

Sport:

- Billy Bingham (1931–2022), Northern Irish footballer
- Craig Bingham, Scottish footballer
- Stuart Bingham, an English Snooker player, world snooker champion 2015

Writers

- Madeleine Bingham, Baroness Clanmorris (1912–1988), English writer and wife of 7th Baron

== American ==
Artists and writers:

- George Caleb Bingham, 19th-century American realist artist
- Henrietta A. Bingham (1841–1877), American writer, editor, preceptress
- Howard Bingham, photographer
- Jennie M. Bingham, American writer
- Robert Bingham, American writer
- Sallie Bingham (1937–2025), American author, playwright, poet, teacher, feminist activist, and philanthropist

Business

- Anna Bingham (1745–1829), businesswoman and innkeeper

Stage and Film industry workers:

- Bob Bingham (1946–2025), American actor and singer
- J. Michael Bingham, pseudonym of D. C. Fontana, screenplay writer
- Traci Bingham, American actress & model
- Courtney Bingham, model & wife of Nikki Sixx

Law:

- Robert Worth Bingham, lawyer, US Ambassador to the United Kingdom, and owner of the Courier-Journal newspaper of Louisville, Kentucky
- Stephen Bingham is a progressive activist and legal services attorney in San Francisco
- Theodore A. Bingham, Brigadier General and New York City Police Commissioner
- Gwen Bingham, first female Commanding Officer of TACOM

Mathematics and science:

- Caroline Priscilla Bingham (née Lord 1831–1932), American botanist
- Christopher Bingham, American statistician who introduced the Bingham distribution and jointly with other introduced complex demodulation into Fourier analysis of time series
- Eula Bingham, American scientist and head of the Occupational Safety and Health Agency (OSHA) under Jimmy Carter
- Harold Clyde Bingham, psychologist and primatologist
- Hiram Bingham III, explorer and U.S. Senator, best known as rediscoverer of sacred Inca city of Machu Picchu
- Eugene C. Bingham, a professor at Lafayette College who coined the term rheology
- Millicent Todd Bingham, Geographer, first woman to receive a doctorate in geology and geography from Harvard University
- Paul M. Bingham is an American molecular biologist and evolutionary theorist

Missionaries:

- Hiram Bingham I, missionary to the Kingdom of Hawai'i
- Hiram Bingham II, missionary to the Kingdom of Hawai'i

Politicians:

- Chad Bingham, Georgia state legislator
- E. Volney Bingham (1844–1922), Indiana state legislator
- Elizabeth Bingham, Wyoming state legislator
- Erin Bingham, Idaho state legislator
- Henry H. Bingham, United States Civil War Hero and Congressman from Pennsylvania
- Hiram Bingham IV, US Vice Consul in Marseille, France, during World War II, who rescued Jews from the Holocaust
- James Bingham, Indiana Attorney General
- James M. Bingham, Wisconsin state legislator
- John Bingham, U.S. Representative from Ohio during the Reconstruction
- Jonathan Brewster Bingham, U.S. Representative from New York
- Kinsley S. Bingham, U.S. Representative, U.S. Senator, and Governor of Michigan
- Stan Bingham, North Carolina state legislator
- William Bingham, Senator in the early USA
- William Bingham (Pittsburgh), Mayor of Pittsburgh, Pennsylvania, 1856 to 1857.

Publishers:

- Barry Bingham Sr., owner and publisher of Pulitzer Prize–winning Courier-Journal newspaper of Louisville, Kentucky
- Barry Bingham Jr., editor and publisher of Pulitzer Prize–winning Courier-Journal newspaper of Louisville, Kentucky
- Henrietta Bingham, American journalist and horse breeder associated with Bloomsbury Group

Sports:

- Craig Bingham (American football), Jamaican-born American football player
- Dave Bingham, American college baseball coach
- Don Bingham, American football player
- Marcus Bingham Jr. (born 2000), American basketball player

== Others ==
- Max Bingham, Australian politician in the Tasmanian House of Assembly
- Mark Bingham, a leader of the attempted passenger revolt against hijackers aboard United Airlines Flight 93
- Tyler Bingham, US-American criminal

== See also ==
- Bingham (disambiguation)
