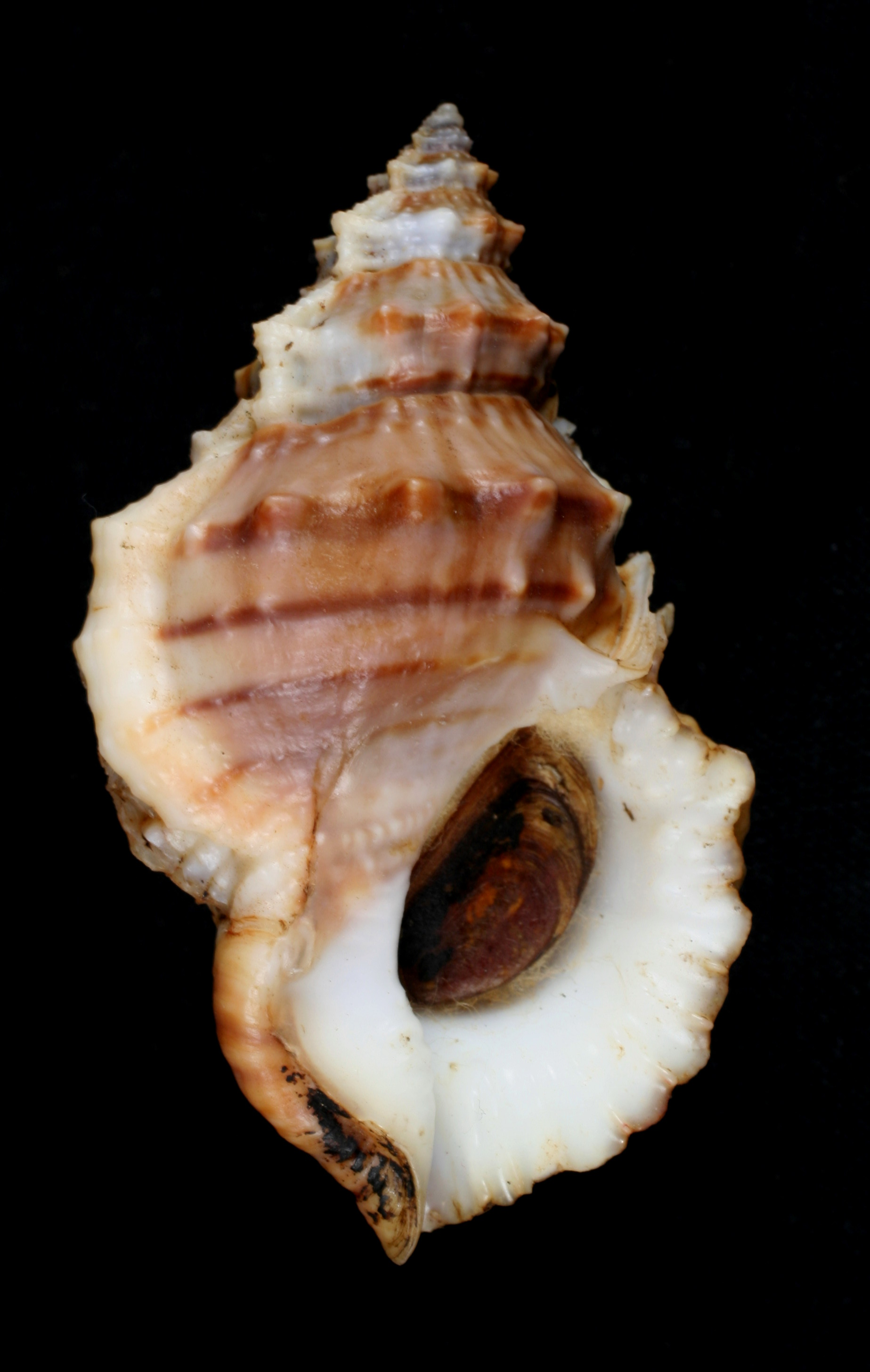
- Apertural view of Marsupina nana (Broderip & Sowerby, 1829) with operculum

Scientific classification
- Kingdom: Animalia
- Phylum: Mollusca
- Class: Gastropoda
- Subclass: Caenogastropoda
- Order: Littorinimorpha
- Family: Bursidae
- Genus: Marsupina
- Species: M. nana

Binomial name
- Marsupina nana (Broderip & G.B. Sowerby I, 1829)

Synonyms
- Ranella albofasciata G.B. Sowerby II, 1841; Ranella nana Brodrip & G.B. Sowerby I, 1829; Ranella pulchra G.B. Sowerby II, 1835

= Marsupina nana =

Species of gastropod

Marsupina nana, the dwarf frog shell, is a species of sea snail, a marine gastropod mollusc in the family Bursidae, the frog shells.

== Description ==
The Shell size varies between 30 mm and 60 mm.

== Distribution ==
This species is distributed in the Gulf of California (along Western Mexico) and in the Pacific Ocean along Peru.
