= Miriano Malarin =

American politician

Miriano Malarin served as a member of the 1859-1861 California State Assembly, representing the 3rd District.

Preceded by Hiram A. Imus	3rd District, California State Assembly; 1859-1860	Succeeded by James L. Halsted
