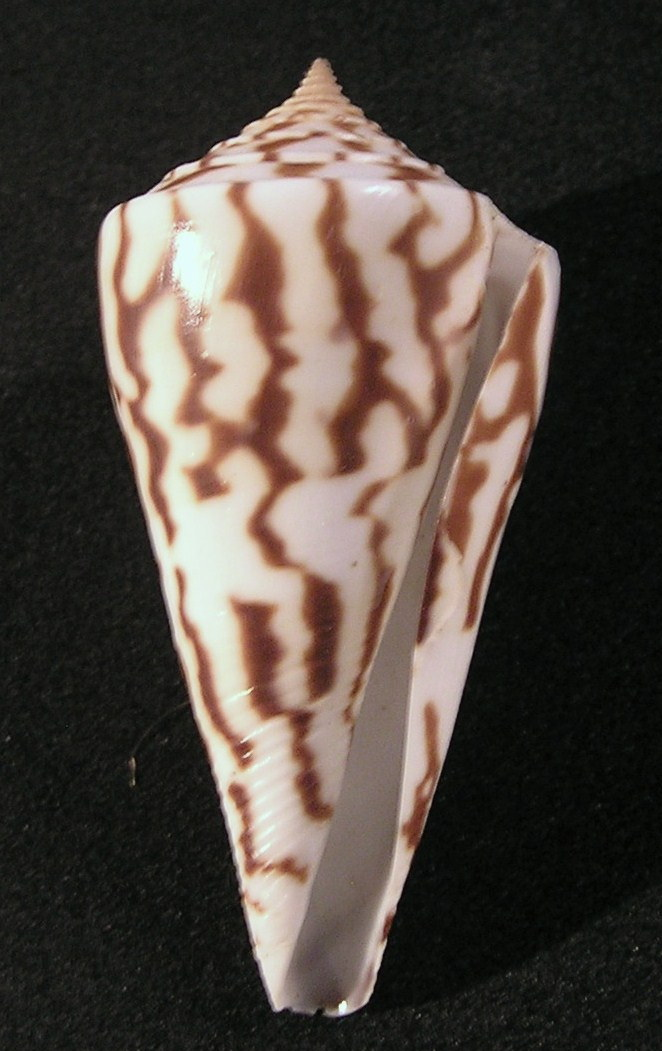
- Apertural view of a shell of Conus recurvus

Scientific classification
- Kingdom: Animalia
- Phylum: Mollusca
- Class: Gastropoda
- Subclass: Caenogastropoda
- Order: Neogastropoda
- Superfamily: Conoidea
- Family: Conidae
- Genus: Conus
- Species: C. recurvus

Binomial name
- Conus recurvus Broderip, 1833

Synonyms
- Conus (Dauciconus) recurvus Broderip, 1833 · accepted, alternate representation; Conus gradatus thaanumi Schwengel, 1955; Gradiconus recurvus (Broderip, 1833)

= Conus recurvus =

Species of sea snail

Conus recurvus, common name the recurved cone, is a species of sea snail, a marine gastropod mollusk in the family Conidae, the cone snails, cone shells or cones.

These snails are predatory and venomous. They are capable of stinging humans.

The variety Conus recurvus var. helenae Schwengel, 1955 is a synonym of Conus scalaris Valenciennes, 1832.

== Description ==
The size of the shell varies between 40 mm and 100 mm.

(Original description in Latin) The shell is elongated and conical, with a slightly recurved shape. It is white in color, clouded with reddish-brown patches and marked with rows of spots arranged in bands. The spire is prominent and acute, featuring a pattern of white and chestnut-colored spots. Furthermore, the shell is covered by an extremely thin epidermis.

== Distribution ==
This marine species occurs in the Pacific Ocean off Baja California, Mexico to Peru and off the Galapagos Islands.
