= 47th United States Colored Infantry Regiment =

- Active: March 11, 1864 - January 9, 1866
- Country: United States
- Allegiance: Union
- Branch: Infantry; United States Colored Troops
- Size: Regiment
- Engagements: American Civil War: Battle of Fort Blakeley

Commanders
- Notable commanders: Hiram Scofield

The 47th United States Colored Infantry Regiment, was a regiment of African-American troops recruited from Louisiana that served in the Union Army during the American Civil War. The regiment was originally organized as the 8th Louisiana Infantry (African Descent) in 1863, and renamed as the 47th US Colored Infantry in March, 1864. Assigned to garrison duty along the Mississippi, the 47th Colored Infantry later fought at the Battle of Fort Blakeley in Alabama, and guarded the Mexican border in south Texas before mustering out of service in January, 1866.

== Predecessor unit ==
The regiment was initially organized in the spring of 1863 as the 8th Louisiana Infantry (African Descent), which was among the first units of Black soldiers organized in the South. The 8th Louisiana was led by Hiram Scofield, a white veteran officer of the 2nd Iowa Infantry who was promoted to colonel and given command of the new regiment when it was formed at Lake Providence, Louisiana.

The 8th Louisiana fought at the Battle of Milliken's Bend in June, 1863, one of the earliest battles in which Black Union troops demonstrated their skill as soldiers. The regiment also fought a small skirmish with Confederate troops at Goodrich's Landing, Louisiana on June 9. Assigned to the post of Vicksburg, Mississippi, the 8th Louisiana fought at the Battle of Yazoo City in March, 1864, before being redesignated as the 47th United States Colored Infantry Regiment on March 11.

== Garrison Duty ==
Units of Black soldiers were assigned to garrison duties to hold strategic locations along the Mississippi River and free up veteran Union regiments for service elsewhere. General Henry Halleck wrote to Ulysses S. Grant in July 1863 expressing his opinion that the regiments of freshly-recruited Black troops would be suitable for this assignment: “The Mississippi should be the base of future operations east and west. When Port Hudson falls, the fortifications of that place, as well as of Vicksburg, should be so arranged as to be held by the smallest possible garrisons, thus leaving the mass of troops for operations in the field. I suggest that colored troops be used as far as possible in the garrisons."

By December 1864, Colonel Scofield of the 47th was commanding a brigade of Black troops based at Vicksburg, including the 46th, 47th, 50th, and 52nd Colored Infantry Regiments. The companies of the 47th Colored Infantry were assigned to guard various posts including Vicksburg, Lake Providence, Louisiana, and White River, Arkansas.

== Fort Blakeley and post-war ==
In February 1865, the 47th Regiment was ordered to depart from Vicksburg and make their way to New Orleans. Later in the spring, the regiment along with several other Colored Troops units shipped out to Florida and marched overland towards Mobile, Alabama, one of the last large cities still in Confederate hands. The 47th then took part in the Battle of Fort Blakeley, an operation aimed at seizing a Confederate-held fort in Mobile Bay. The brigade of Black soldiers led by Colonel Scofield laid siege to the fort and assaulted the fortifications on April 9, successfully capturing Fort Blakeley on the same day that General Robert E. Lee's Confederate forces in Virginia surrendered. The performance under fire of the 47th Regiment was praised by the colonel of the 50th Colored Troops, who reported that the assault on Fort Blakeley was "convincing proof that the former slaves of the South cannot be excelled as soldiers." The 47th Colored infantry lost 2 soldiers killed and 18 wounded at Fort Blakeley, with one officer wounded.

After the battle, the regiment took part in the occupation of Mobile and Montgomery, Alabama until the cessation of hostilities, and in June it was ordered to embark to the Texas-Mexico border. Mexico's government had been at war with French-backed Imperialist forces during a conflict that coincided with the American Civil War, and US troops were sent to the border to show support for the government and prevent any linkage between defeated Confederates and French troops. Following the collapse of the French effort in Mexico, the regiment was mustered out of service on January 9, 1866.

== Casualties ==
Total casualties of the regiment (encompassing the period where it was denoted as the 8th Louisiana and as the 47th Colored infantry) include 1 officer and 30 men killed in battle or died of wounds, and 3 officers and 398 men killed by disease. Diseases killed many more soldiers in the civil war than enemy fire, and the incidence of diseases caused by poor sanitary conditions such as dysentery was 36% higher in Colored Troops regiments than in white units. Black troops were 25% more likely to die from such illnesses than their white comrades.

== Commanding officers ==
Commanding officers of the 47th US Colored Infantry:

- Colonel Hiram Scofield, promoted to brevet brigadier general, March 1865.
- Lieutenant Colonel Ferdinand F. Peebles, promoted to brevet colonel, March 1865, resigned August 1865.

== See also ==
- List of United States Colored Troops Civil War units
