= Tripterotyphinae =

Scientific classification
- Kingdom: Animalia
- Phylum: Mollusca
- Class: Gastropoda
- Subclass: Caenogastropoda
- Order: Neogastropoda
- Superfamily: Muricoidea
- Family: Muricidae
- Subfamily: Tripterotyphinae; D'Attilio & Hertz, 1988

Genera
- See text

Subfamily of gastropods

Tripterotyphinae is a subfamily in the family Muricidae.

== Genera ==
According to the World Register of Marine Species, the subfamily Tripterotyphinae contains four genera.

- Cinclidotyphis DuShane, 1969
- Pterotyphis Jousseaume, 1880
- Semityphis Martin, 1931
- Tripterotyphis Pilsbry & Lowe, 1932

Genera brought into synonymy

- Nothotyphis Fleming, 1962: synonym of Tripterotyphis Pilsbry & Lowe, 1932
- Perotyphis Jousseaume, 1880: synonym of Pterotyphis Jousseaume, 1880 (incorrect original spelling, see Errata p. 367; spelling Pterotyphis conserved under Art. 33.2.3.1)
- Trigonotyphis Jousseaume, 1882: synonym of Pterotyphis Jousseaume, 1880
