= Semityphis =

Scientific classification
- Kingdom: Animalia
- Phylum: Mollusca
- Class: Gastropoda
- Subclass: Caenogastropoda
- Order: Neogastropoda
- Superfamily: Muricoidea
- Family: Muricidae
- Subfamily: Tripterotyphinae
- Genus: †Semityphis; Martin, 1931

Extinct genus of gastropods

Semityphis is an extinct genus of sea snails, marine gastropod mollusks, in the family Muricidae, the murex snails or rock snails.
