= Cinclidotyphis myrae =

Scientific classification
- Kingdom: Animalia
- Phylum: Mollusca
- Class: Gastropoda
- Subclass: Caenogastropoda
- Order: Neogastropoda
- Family: Muricidae
- Genus: Cinclidotyphis
- Species: C. myrae

Binomial name
- Cinclidotyphis myrae DuShane, 1969

Species of gastropod

Cinclidotyphis myrae is a species of sea snail, a marine gastropod mollusc in the family Muricidae, the murex snails or rock snails.
