= Hiram Evans =

Hiram Evans is the name of:

- Hiram Kinsman Evans (1863–1941), U.S. Representative from Iowa
- Hiram Wesley Evans (1881–1966), Imperial Wizard of the second Ku Klux Klan

== See also ==
- For other uses and people with the given name Hiram, see Hiram (disambiguation)
- For other people with the surname Evans, see List of people with surname Evans
