= Tripterotyphis arcana =

Scientific classification
- Kingdom: Animalia
- Phylum: Mollusca
- Class: Gastropoda
- Subclass: Caenogastropoda
- Order: Neogastropoda
- Family: Muricidae
- Genus: Tripterotyphis
- Species: T. arcana

Binomial name
- Tripterotyphis arcana (DuShane, 1969)

Synonyms
- Pterotyphis (Tripterotyphis) arcana DuShane, 1969

Species of gastropod

Tripterotyphis arcana is a species of sea snail, a marine gastropod mollusc in the family Muricidae, the murex snails or rock snails.
