= A. G. Escandon =

American politician

A. G. Escandon served as a member of the 1869-71 California State Assembly, representing the 3rd District. He served again from 1873-1875.

Preceded by William T. McElhany	3rd District, California State Assembly; 1869–1871	Succeeded by Joel H. Cooper
Preceded by Joel H. Cooper	3rd District, California State Assembly; 1873–1875	Succeeded by William A. Hayne
