= A. W. Blair =

American politician

Member of the California State Assembly
- In office 1861–1862
- Preceded by: James L. Halsted
- Succeeded by: Charles Ford
- Constituency: Monterey

A. W. Blair was an American politician. He was a member of the California State Assembly for Monterey, California from 1861 to 1862. In 1861, he voted against a state resolution for California to stay in the Union (which passed the assembly).

Preceded by James L. Halsted	3rd District, California State Assembly; 1861–1862	Succeeded by Charles Ford
