= William T. McElhany =

American politician (1833–??)

William T. McElhany (born 1833 in New York) served as a member of the 1867–1869 California State Assembly, representing the 3rd District. He was a member of the Union party.

Preceded by Raymon J. Hill	3rd District, California State Assembly; 1867-1869	Succeeded by A. G. Escandon
