= Pterotyphis fimbriatus =

Scientific classification
- Kingdom: Animalia
- Phylum: Mollusca
- Class: Gastropoda
- Subclass: Caenogastropoda
- Order: Neogastropoda
- Family: Muricidae
- Genus: Pterotyphis
- Species: P. fimbriatus

Binomial name
- Pterotyphis fimbriatus (A. Adams, 1854)

Synonyms
- Murex jamracki Martens, 1861; Typhis fimbriatus A. Adams, 1854

Species of gastropod

Pterotyphis fimbriatus is a species of sea snail, a marine gastropod mollusk in the family Muricidae, the murex snails or rock snails.
