= Raymon J. Hill =

American politician

Raymon J. Hill served as a member of the 1863–1867 California State Assembly, representing the 3rd District.

Preceded by Charles W. Dana	3rd District, California State Assembly; 1863-1867	Succeeded by William T. McElhany
