= Charles Ford (California politician) =

American politician

Charles Ford served as a member of the 1861-62 California State Assembly, representing the 3rd District.

Preceded by A. W. Blair	3rd District, California State Assembly; 1861-1862	Succeeded by Charles W. Dana
