= Cinclidotyphis =

Scientific classification
- Kingdom: Animalia
- Phylum: Mollusca
- Class: Gastropoda
- Subclass: Caenogastropoda
- Order: Neogastropoda
- Family: Muricidae
- Subfamily: Tripterotyphinae
- Genus: Cinclidotyphis; DuShane, 1969

Genus of gastropods

Cinclidotyphis is a genus of sea snails, marine gastropod mollusks in the family Muricidae, the murex snails or rock snails.

== Species ==
Species within the genus Cinclidotyphis include:

- Cinclidotyphis myrae DuShane, 1969
