= Hiram =

Hiram may refer to:

== People ==
- Hiram (name)

== Places ==
- Hiram, Georgia
  - Hiram High School, Hiram, Georgia
- Hiram, Maine
- Hiram, Missouri
- Hiram, Ohio
  - Hiram College, a private liberal arts college located in Hiram, Ohio
    - Hiram Terriers, the school's sports teams
- Hiram, Texas
- Hiram, West Virginia
- Hiram Township, Cass County, Minnesota

== Other uses ==
- Hiram (TV series), a TV drama series in the Philippines
- Hiram's Highway, a road in Hong Kong
- Hiram House, one of the first settlement houses in the United States
- Hiram Masonic Lodge No. 7, a gothic revival building in Franklin, Tennessee; also the oldest masonic lodge in Tennessee
- Operation Hiram, a three-day military operation in the Upper Galilee launched by the Israeli army at the end of October 1948

== See also ==
- Hyrum (disambiguation)
