= Bigham =

Bigham is a surname. It possibly comes from Bigholm Road in Beith, Scotland. Notable people with the surname include:

- Brett Bigham, American educator
- Charlie Bigham, founder of Charlie Bigham's
- Clive Bigham, 2nd Viscount Mersey (1872–1956), British peer and politician
- Daniel Bigham (born 1991), British racing cyclist
- David Bigham (born 1971), British athlete
- John Bigham, 1st Viscount Mersey (1840–1929), British jurist and politician
- Karla Bigham (born 1979), American politician
- Trevor Bigham (1876–1954), British barrister

== See also ==
- Bingham
