= Tripterotyphis triangularis =

Scientific classification
- Kingdom: Animalia
- Phylum: Mollusca
- Class: Gastropoda
- Subclass: Caenogastropoda
- Order: Neogastropoda
- Family: Muricidae
- Genus: Tripterotyphis
- Species: T. triangularis

Binomial name
- Tripterotyphis triangularis (A. Adams, 1856)

Synonyms
- Murex cancellatus Sowerby, 1841; Pterotyphis triangularis (A. Adams, 1856); Typhis triangularis A. Adams, 1856

Species of gastropod

Tripterotyphis triangularis is a species of sea snail, a marine gastropod mollusk in the family Muricidae, the murex snails or rock snails.
