= Charles W. Dana =

American politician

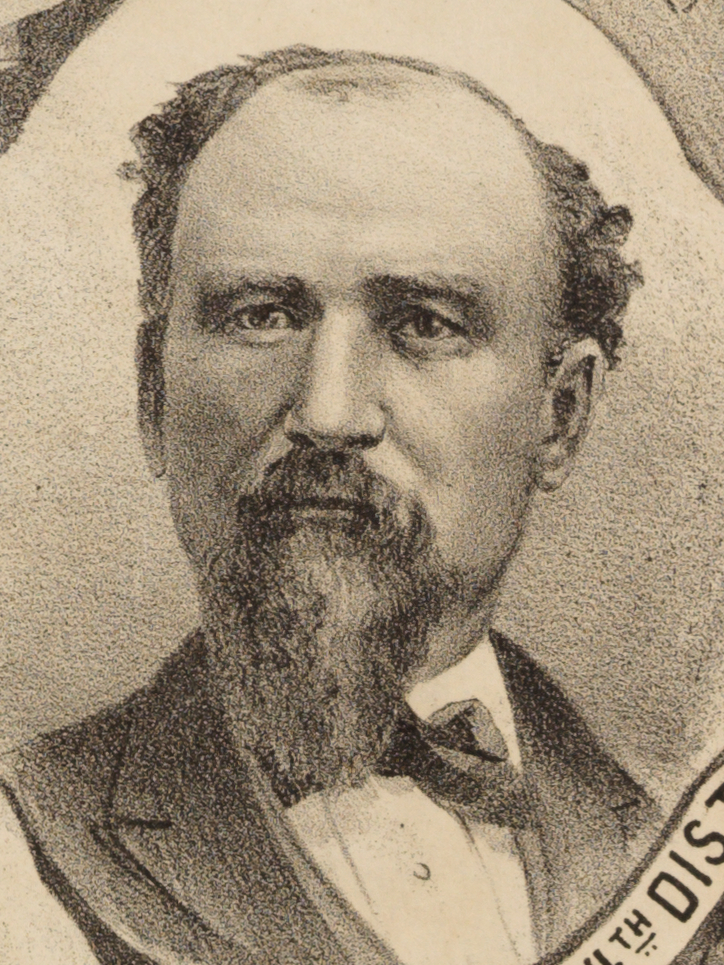
Engraving by Britton & Rey from a photograph by G. D. Morse, 1882

Charles W. Dana (June 27, 1837 – February 28, 1896) was an American politician who was a member of the 1862–63 California State Assembly, representing the 3rd District.

Preceded by Charles Ford	3rd District, California State Assembly; 1862-1863	Succeeded by Raymon J. Hill
