= Pterotyphis ryalli =

Scientific classification
- Kingdom: Animalia
- Phylum: Mollusca
- Class: Gastropoda
- Subclass: Caenogastropoda
- Order: Neogastropoda
- Family: Muricidae
- Genus: Pterotyphis
- Species: P. ryalli

Binomial name
- Pterotyphis ryalli Houart, 1996

Species of gastropod

Pterotyphis ryalli is a species of sea snail, a marine gastropod mollusk in the family Muricidae, the murex snails or rock snails.
