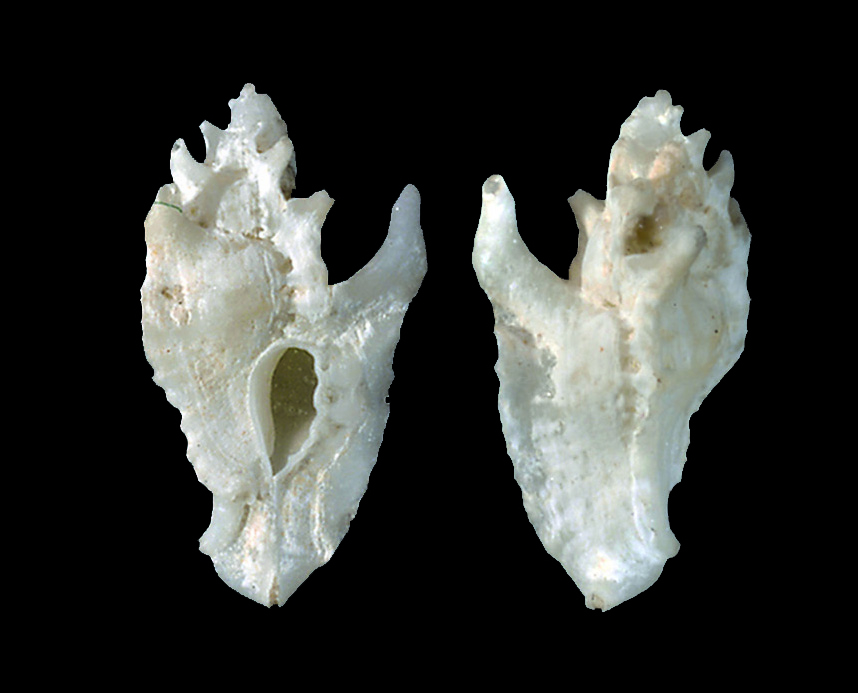
- Shell of Tripterotyphis tenuis (paratype at MNHN, Paris)

Scientific classification
- Kingdom: Animalia
- Phylum: Mollusca
- Class: Gastropoda
- Subclass: Caenogastropoda
- Order: Neogastropoda
- Superfamily: Muricoidea
- Family: Muricidae
- Subfamily: Tripterotyphinae
- Genus: Tripterotyphis; Pilsbry & Lowe, 1932

Type species
- Typhis lowei Pilsbry, 1931

Synonyms
- Nothotyphis Fleming, 1962; Pterotyphis (Tripterotyphis) Pilsbry & H. N. Lowe, 1932; Pterynotus (Nothotyphis) C. A. Fleming, 1962; Typhis (Tripterotyphis) Pilsbry & H. N. Lowe, 1932 (original rank)

= Tripterotyphis =

Genus of gastropods

Tripterotyphis is a genus of sea snails, marine gastropod mollusks in the family Muricidae, the murex snails or rock snails.

== Species ==
Species within the genus Tripterotyphis include:

- Tripterotyphis arcana (DuShane, 1969)
- Tripterotyphis colemani (Ponder, 1972)
- Tripterotyphis fayae (Keen & Campbell, 1964)
- Tripterotyphis galapagosensis Wiedrick & Houart, 2021
- Tripterotyphis jamesmacleani Wiedrick & Houart, 2021
- Tripterotyphis lowei (Pilsbry, 1931)
- Tripterotyphis norfolkensis (C. A. Fleming, 1962)
- Tripterotyphis robustus (Verco, 1895)
- Tripterotyphis tenuis Garrigues, 2020
- Tripterotyphis triangularis (A. Adams, 1856)
- † Tripterotyphis tripterus (Grateloup, 1833)
