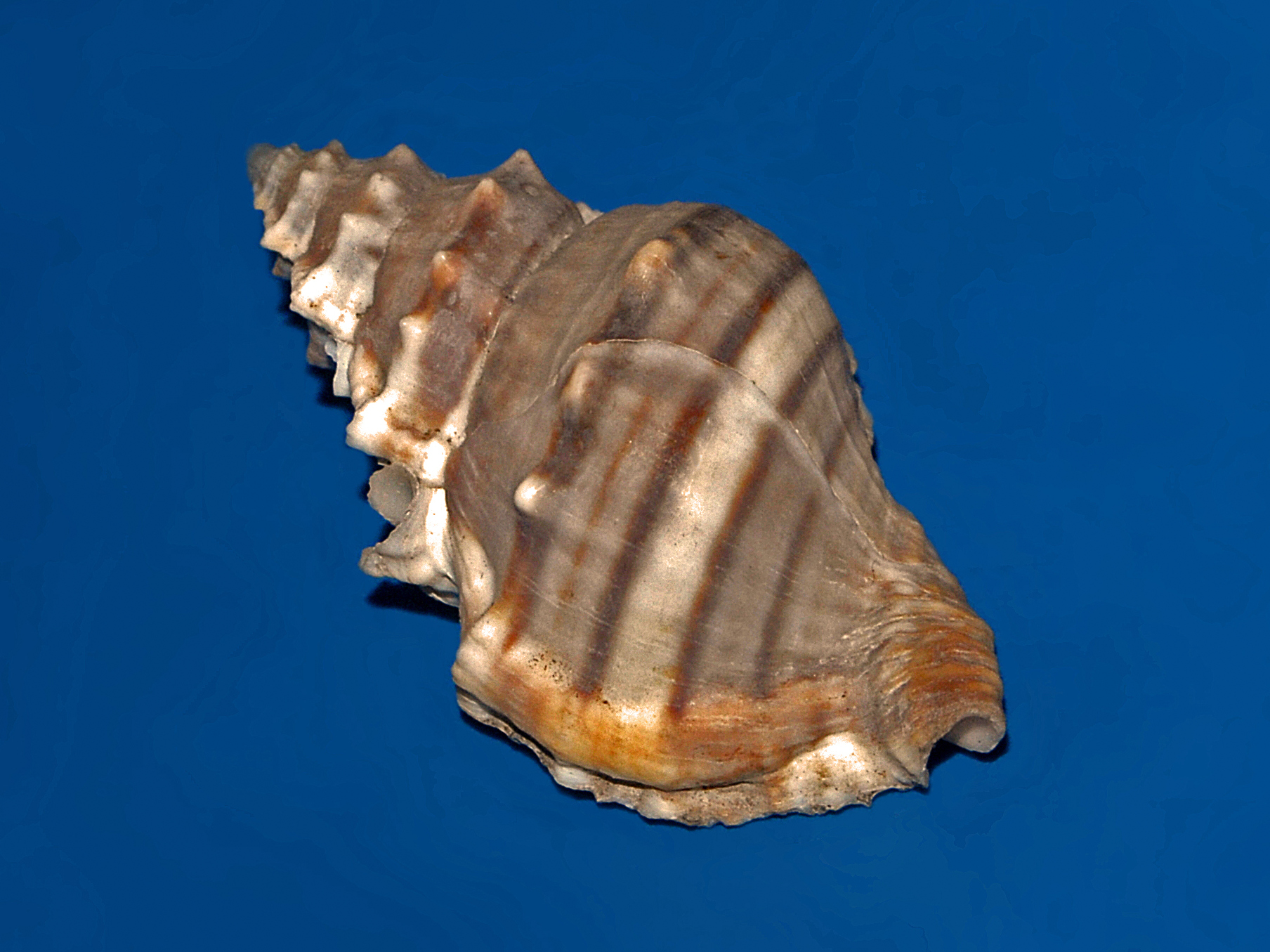
- Shell of Marsupina nana from Mexico at the Museo Civico di Storia Naturale di Milano

Scientific classification
- Kingdom: Animalia
- Phylum: Mollusca
- Class: Gastropoda
- Subclass: Caenogastropoda
- Order: Littorinimorpha
- Family: Bursidae
- Genus: Marsupina; Dall, 1904

Synonyms
- Bechtelia Emerson & Hertlein, 1964; Buffo Montfort, 1810<

= Marsupina =

Genus of gastropods

Marsupina is a genus of sea snails, marine gastropod mollusks in the family Bursidae, the frog shells.

== Species ==
Species within the genus Marsupina include:

- Marsupina bufo (Bruguière, 1792)
- Marsupina nana (Broderip & G.B. Sowerby I, 1829)
