= Tripterotyphis fayae =

Scientific classification
- Kingdom: Animalia
- Phylum: Mollusca
- Class: Gastropoda
- Subclass: Caenogastropoda
- Order: Neogastropoda
- Family: Muricidae
- Genus: Tripterotyphis
- Species: T. fayae

Binomial name
- Tripterotyphis fayae (Keen & Campbell,1964)

Synonyms
- Pterotyphis (Tripterotyphis) fayae Keen & Campbell,1964

Species of gastropod

Tripterotyphis fayae is a species of sea snail, a marine gastropod mollusk in the family Muricidae, the murex snails or rock snails.
