= Binghamton (disambiguation) =

Binghamton is a city in the U.S. state of New York.

Binghamton may also refer to:

== Places ==
- Binghamton metropolitan area, the region encompassing the city of Binghamton and its suburbs (also known as the Triple Cities)
  - Downtown Binghamton
  - Binghamton (town), New York, a town neighboring the city
- Binghamton, California
- Binghampton, Memphis, Tennessee, a neighborhood (frequently misspelled "Binghamton")
- Binghamton, Wisconsin, an unincorporated community

== Education ==
- Binghamton University, a public university in New York state
- Binghamton City School District, a public school district in the state of New York
  - Binghamton High School

== Sports ==
- Binghamton Bearcats, the NCAA Division I athletics program at Binghamton University
- Binghamton Rumble Ponies, an Eastern League baseball team
- Binghamton Devils, an American Hockey League team
- Binghamton Senators, a former American Hockey League team that played from 2002 to 2017

== Transportation ==
- Binghamton (Delaware, Lackawanna and Western Railroad station)
- Binghamton (ferryboat), a 1905 former ferry and restaurant moored in Edgewater, New Jersey
- Binghamton Electric, a defunct automobile manufacturer
- Greater Binghamton Airport, north of Binghamton, New York

== Disasters ==
- 2009 Binghamton shooting, a 2009 mass shooting in Binghamton, New York
- 1913 Binghamton Factory fire, Binghamton, New York

== Other ==
- Binghamton Zoo at Ross Park, Binghamton, New York
- Captain Binghamton, a character in the 1960s television show McHale's Navy

== See also ==
- Bingham (disambiguation)
- Binghampton (disambiguation)
