= Tripterotyphis lowei =

Scientific classification
- Kingdom: Animalia
- Phylum: Mollusca
- Class: Gastropoda
- Subclass: Caenogastropoda
- Order: Neogastropoda
- Family: Muricidae
- Genus: Tripterotyphis
- Species: T. lowei

Binomial name
- Tripterotyphis lowei (Pilsbry, 1931)

Synonyms
- Typhis lowei Pilsbry, 1931

Species of gastropod

Tripterotyphis lowei is a species of sea snail, a marine gastropod mollusk in the family Muricidae, the murex snails or rock snails.
