= Pterotyphis =

Scientific classification
- Kingdom: Animalia
- Phylum: Mollusca
- Class: Gastropoda
- Subclass: Caenogastropoda
- Order: Neogastropoda
- Family: Muricidae
- Subfamily: Tripterotyphinae
- Genus: Pterotyphis; Jousseaume, 1880

Species
- See text

Genus of gastropods

Pterotyphis is a genus of predatory sea snails, marine gastropod molluscs in the family Muricidae, the rock snails.

== Species ==
Species within the genus Pterotyphis include:

- Pterotyphis fimbriatus (A. Adams, 1854)
- Pterotyphis pinnatus (Broderip, 1833)
- Pterotyphis ryalli (Houart, 1996)
