= James L. Halsted =

American politician

James L. Halsted served as a member of the 1860-61 California State Assembly, representing the 3rd District.

Preceded by Miriano Malarin	3rd District, California State Assembly; 1859-1861	Succeeded by A. W. Blair
