= George Bingham (antiquary) =

George Bingham (1715–1800) was an English cleric and antiquarian.

== Life ==
The sixth son of Richard Bingham, and Philadelphia, daughter and the heir of John Potinger, by Philadelphia, daughter of Sir John Ernle, chancellor of the exchequer, he was born on 7 November 1715 at Melcombe, Dorset. He was brought up under the care of his maternal grandfather, Mr. Potinger. At age 12 he was sent to Westminster School, and in 1732 he was elected from the foundation to a scholarship at Trinity College, Cambridge, but entered Christ Church, Oxford as a commoner. After taking his B.A. degree he was elected a fellow of All Souls, and there graduated M.A. in 1739 and B.D. in 1748. At All Souls he formed lasting friendships with Sir William Blackstone and Dr. Benjamin Buckler, whom he assisted in drawing up the Stemmata Chicheliana.

In 1746, during the Jacobite rebellion, Bingham served the office of proctor in the university, and acted with great spirit. On the death of the Rev. Christopher Pitt, the translator of the Æneid, Bingham was instituted, on 23 May 1748, to the rectory of Pimperne, Dorsetshire. He resigned his fellowship on his marriage; but his wife, by whom he had a daughter and two sons, died in 1760 at the age of thirty-five. He had just been presented by Sir Gerard Napier to the living of More Critchell (1755), to which that of Long Critchell was annexed in 1774. He was elected proctor for the diocese of Salisbury in the convocations of 1761, 1768, 1774, and 1780. His eldest son, the senior scholar at Winchester, was accidentally drowned while bathing in the river Itchin in 1708. In 1781 Bishop Bagot offered him the Warburtonian lecture, but he declined to preach it, because he held that the church of Rome, though corrupt, was not chargeable, as Warburton meant to prove, with apostasy.

Bingham died at Pimperne on 11 October 1800, aged 85, and was buried in the chancel of the church. A marble monument, with a long inscription in Latin, was erected to his memory.

== Works ==
Bingham published in his lifetime:

- An anonymous essay on the Millennium, entitled Τά χίλια έτη, 1772.
- A Vindication of the Doctrine and Liturgy of the Church of England, occasioned by the Apology of the Rev. Theophilus Lindsey, M.A., on resigning the vicarage of Catterick, Yorkshire, Oxford, 1774. It was dedicated to Thomas Newton, Bishop of Bristol, who mentioned it in a charge to the clergy of his diocese in 1776. Both these works were reprinted in Dissertations, Essays, and Sermons (2 vols., London, 1804), edited, with a biographical memoir, by his son, Peregrine Bingham the elder, rector of Edmondsham, Dorset. The collection also includes:
  - Dissertationes Apocalypticæ, in three parts.
  - Paul at Athens, an essay.
  - Commentary on Solomon's Song.
  - Four sermons.

Bingham assisted to John Hutchins with his History of Dorsetshire. His Biographical Anecdotes of Hutchins are printed in the Bibliotheca Topographica Britannica, No. xxxiv, 2nd ed. London, 1813.
