= Binghampton =

Binghampton may refer to various places, including:

- Binghampton, Illinois, an unincorporated community, United States
- Binghampton, Memphis, Tennessee, a Memphis neighborhood, United States
- Binghampton Township, Barnes County, North Dakota, United States

== See also ==
- Binghamton (disambiguation)
