= Brigham =

Brigham may refer to:

== Places ==
- Brigham, Cumbria, England
- Brigham, East Riding of Yorkshire, England
- Brigham City, Utah, USA
- Brigham, Wisconsin, USA
- Brigham, Quebec, Canada

== People ==
- Brigham (surname), including a list of people with the surname
- Brigham Young (1801–1877), second prophet and president of The Church of Jesus Christ of Latter-day Saints (LDS Church)
  - Brigham Young Jr. (1836–1903), American Mormon missionary and leader in the LDS Church, a son of Brigham Young
  - Brigham Morris Young (1854–1931), Mormon missionary and entertainer, another son of Brigham Young
- Brigham D. Madsen (1914–2010), American historian
- Brigham McCown (born 1966), American entrepreneur and former government official
- Brigham Smoot (1869–1946), American Mormon missionary and businessman

== Institutions ==
- Brigham and Women's Hospital, a Harvard University affiliated teaching and research institution in Boston, Massachusetts
- Brigham Young University (BYU), in Provo, Utah, USA
- Brigham Young University–Idaho (BYU—Idaho or BYU—I)
- Brigham Young University–Hawaii
- Brigham Young College, Logan, Utah, USA

== Other uses ==
- HMS Brigham (M2613), a 1953 Ham class in-shore minesweeper
- Brigham (film), a 1977 American film
- Mercedes Brigham, a character in the Honorverse books by David Weber
- Mount Brigham, a mountain in Utah, USA
