= Hiram Berry =

Hiram Berry may refer to:

- Hiram Gregory Berry (1824–1863), American politician and general
- Hiram Berry (Glee), fictional character
