= Hiram Scofield =

American lawyer

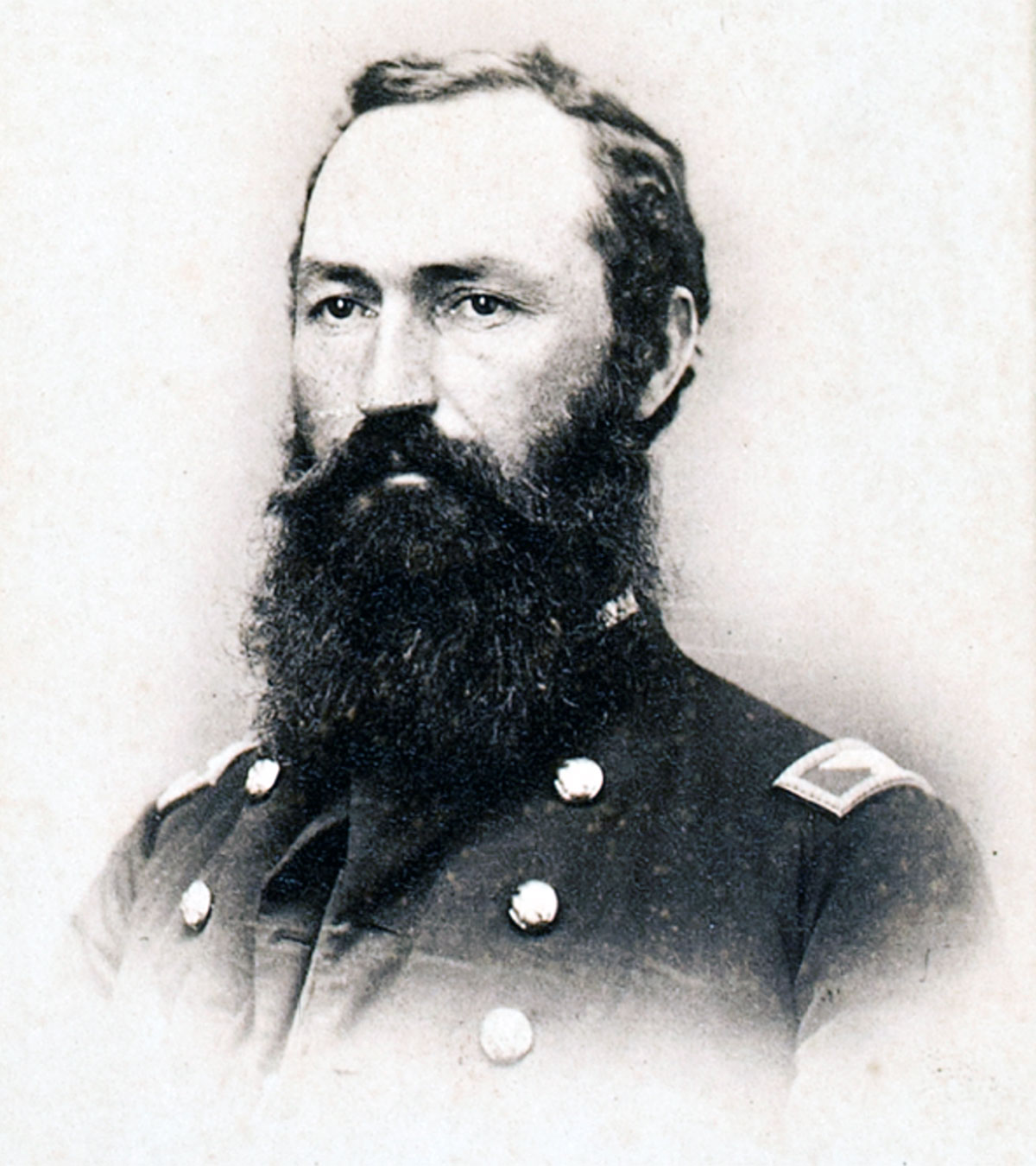
- Born: July 1, 1830; Saratoga County, New York
- Died: December 30, 1906 (aged 76); Seattle, Washington
- Military career
- Allegiance: United States of America; Union
- Branch: Union Army
- Service years: 1861–1866
- Rank: Colonel; Bvt. Brigadier General
- Unit: 2nd Iowa Infantry Regiment
- Commands: 8th Louisiana Infantry Regiment (African Descent); 47th U.S. Colored Troops
- Conflicts: Battle of Fort Donelson; Battle of Shiloh; Battle of Vicksburg; First Battle of Memphis; Battle of Fort Blakeley

Hiram Scofield (July 1, 1830 – December 30, 1906) was a lawyer and Union Army officer during the American Civil War. He entered the Army as a private in 1861 and was discharged as a colonel on January 5, 1866. In February 1866 he was nominated by President Andrew Johnson for appointment to the rank of brevet brigadier general of volunteers and the United States Senate confirmed the appointment in April 1866.

== Early life and career ==
Scofield was born in rural Saratoga County, New York. He attended Union College and graduated from Albany Law School in 1856. He established a law practice in Washington, Iowa, in 1858.

== Civil War ==
Scofield enlisted as a private in the Union Army in April 1861 and was assigned to Company H of the 2nd Iowa Infantry. He was promoted to second and then to first lieutenant, taking command of the company in February 1862 at the time of the Battle of Fort Donelson. He was adjudant to Brig. Gen. Jacob G. Lauman at the Battle of Shiloh where Scofield was wounded in the leg. He returned to duty within a month. He was transferred to the staff of Brig. Gen. John McArthur at the Battle of Vicksburg and the First Battle of Memphis.

In spring of 1863, Scofield organized and commanded the 8th Louisiana Regiment Infantry (African Descent) at Lake Providence, Louisiana. The regiment participated in the expedition up the Yazoo River. In the spring of 1864, he was assigned to command the 2nd Brigade of Maj. Gen. Edward Canby's division. The regiment was transferred to Pensacola, Florida, and then participated in the Battle of Fort Blakeley and the capture of Mobile, Alabama. Scofield and his men thereafter were stationed in Louisiana and Texas.

Scofield was mustered out of the volunteers on January 5, 1866. On February 24, 1866, President Andrew Johnson nominated Scofield for appointment to the grade of brevet brigadier general of volunteers, to rank from March 13, 1865, and the United States Senate confirmed the appointment on April 10, 1866.

== Postbellum activities ==
After the Civil War, Scofield resumed his law practice in Iowa, which he continued until his death in 1906 in Seattle, Washington.

Hiram Scofield held "one of the largest private libraries in the nation. After his death his personal library was split between the cities of Washington and Wellman."

== See also ==
- List of American Civil War brevet generals (Union)
