= Bingham, Georgia =

Coordinates: 31°49′08″N 82°46′06″W

Bingham is an extinct town in Jeff Davis County, in the U.S. state of Georgia.

== History ==
A post office called Bingham was established in 1894, and remained in operation until 1907. In 1900, the community had 84 inhabitants. Bingham was described as a Postal village in the western portion of Jeff Davis County and on the Ocmulgee River, roughly eight miles upriver from Lumber City, Georgia.
