= Joel H. Cooper (California politician) =

American politician

Joel Henry Cooper (1841 - October 1, 1899) was an American rancher and lawyer from Santa Barbara, California. He was elected September 6, 1871 as a Democratic member of the California State Assembly from San Luis Obispo County. At the time of his election, he was listed as being 30 years old, a rancher, and a native of Missouri. He was assigned to the standing committees on claims and on agriculture.

On Monday, February 2, 1874, he was married in San Francisco to Emma Hankins of New York City at the residence of Bishop William Ingraham Kip.

He died October 1, 1899, in his rooms. He suffered a sudden hemorrhage and collapsed with his head hanging out the window of his room. A contemporary report said that he bled "[m]ore than a bucketful of blood" onto the sidewalk below before the police broke into his lodging, finding the body still warm.

Preceded by A. G. Escandon	3rd District, California State Assembly; 1871-1873	Succeeded by A. G. Escandon
