= Hiram, West Virginia =

Hiram
- Unincorporated community
- Location within the state of West Virginia Hiram (the United States)
- Coordinates: 39°17′35″N 79°55′56″W
- Country: United States
- State: West Virginia
- County: Preston
- Elevation: 1,280 ft (390 m)
- Time zone: UTC-5 (Eastern (EST))
  - Summer (DST): UTC-4 (EDT)
- GNIS ID: 1549743

Hiram is an unincorporated community in Preston County, West Virginia, United States.
