= Tripterotyphis robustus =

Scientific classification
- Kingdom: Animalia
- Phylum: Mollusca
- Class: Gastropoda
- Subclass: Caenogastropoda
- Order: Neogastropoda
- Family: Muricidae
- Genus: Tripterotyphis
- Species: T. robustus

Binomial name
- Tripterotyphis robustus (Verco, 1895)

Synonyms
- Murex (Poropteron) robustus Verco, 1895

Species of gastropod

Tripterotyphis robustus is a species of sea snail, a marine gastropod mollusk in the family Muricidae, the murex snails or rock snails.
