= Hiram Stevens =

Hiram Stevens may refer to:

- Hiram F. Stevens (1852–1904), American academic
- Hiram Sanford Stevens (1832–1893), Delegate to the U.S. House of Representatives from Arizona Territory (1875–9)
