= Craig Bingham =

Scottish footballer

Personal information
- Full name: Craig Bingham
- Date of birth: 22 December 1979 (age 46)
- Place of birth: Irvine, Scotland
- Height: 5 ft 11 in (1.80 m)
- Position: Midfielder

Senior career*
Years	Team	Apps	(Gls)
2000–2002	Clyde	31	(0)
- * Club domestic league appearances and goals

Craig Bingham (born 22 December 1979 in Irvine), is a Scottish footballer. He was a midfielder.

Bingham joined Clyde in the summer of 2000, signing from his hometown junior side Irvine Meadow. Bingham spent two seasons at Broadwood Stadium, but never really established himself in the first team. He made 38 appearances in total, before dropping back down to the junior ranks to sign for Glenafton Athletic in May 2002.
