= Hyrum =

Hyrum is the name of:

== People ==
- Hyrum Rex Lee, Governor of American Samoa
- Hyrum Smith, an early leader in the Church of Jesus Christ of Latter-Day Saints religious movement
- Hyrum G. Smith, patriarch of the Church of Jesus Christ of Latter-Day Saints
- Hyrum M. Smith, apostle of the Church of Jesus Christ of Latter-Day Saints
- Hyrum W. Smith, American businessman

== Places ==
United States

- Hyrum, Utah
- Hyrum State Park
