= Hiram Wilkinson =

Hiram Wilkinson may refer to:

- Sir Hiram Shaw Wilkinson, British lawyer, diplomat and judge
- Hiram Parkes Wilkinson KC, British lawyer and judge (and son of Hiram Shaw Wilkinson)
