= Hiram Tuttle =

Hiram Tuttle may refer to:

- Hiram A. Tuttle (1837–1911), American merchant and politician
- Hiram Tuttle (equestrian) (1882–1956), American Olympic horse rider
