= Hiram A. Imus Jr. =

American politician

Hiram Abiff Imus Jr. (New Milford, 1804 – Santa Cruz, California 4 October 1876), was an American politician. He served as a member of the 1859-1860 California State Assembly, representing the 3rd District.

Hiram Abiff Imus Jr. was the son of Hiram Abiff Imus. He was married to Eliza Jane Collins and had 12 children. He is buried at Evergreen Cemetery in Santa Cruz.
