= Hiram Raleigh Kennedy =

American politician (1852–1913)

Hiram Raleigh Kennedy (September 30, 1852 – October 7, 1913) was an American physician, farmer and miller from Green Hill, Alabama who served as a Democratic member of the Alabama House of Representatives and the Alabama State Senate.

== Background ==
Kennedy was born on his father's farm, on Cow Pen creek in Lauderdale County, three miles from Green Hill post office, and fourteen miles from Florence, on September 30, 1852. He was the son of Enoch Riley Kennedy (a North Carolina native and Methodist preacher) and Louisa Jane (Chisholm) Kennedy. He attended the county public schools and the State Normal School at Florence, but did not graduate from the latter. He studied medicine under local physician James Kyle, then attended a course of lectures at the University of Louisville in 1877–78, and again in 1879–80, graduating in 1880 with an MD. He went into medical practice in Green Hill, but also operated the family farm and mill.

== Legislative service ==
He was elected to the House for the 1890–1891 and 1892–1893 terms, and in 1900 was elected unopposed to the Senate's First District (Lauderdale and Limestone counties). He chaired the standing committee on public health, and also served on the committee on privileges and elections.

== Personal life ==
Kennedy was a Methodist. On December 9, 1880, he married Mary E. Brotherick, daughter of Benjamin and Nancy (Stubbs) Brotherick. His father died in 1887. As of 1893, Hiram and Mary had five children: Oscar, Edgar, Eva, Reba, and Hiram Jr.

He died at his home on October 7, 1913.
