= Peregrine Bingham the Younger =

Peregrine Bingham, the younger (1788–1864) was an English legal writer and journalist.

== Life ==
He was the eldest son of Peregrine Bingham the elder, by Amy, daughter of William Bowles. He was educated at Winchester School and Magdalen College, Oxford (B.A. 1810), was called to the bar at the Middle Temple in 1818, and was for many years a legal reporter. He also was one of the principal contributors to the Westminster Review, which was established in 1824. John Stuart Mill of the first number said: "The literary and artistic department had rested chiefly on Mr. Bingham, a barrister (subsequently a police magistrate), who had been for some years a frequenter of Bentham, was a friend of both the Austins, and had adopted with great ardour Bentham's philosophical opinions. Partly from accident there were in the first number as many as five articles by Bingham, and we were extremely pleased with them".

Bingham became one of the police magistrates at Great Marlborough Street, and resigned that appointment four years before his death, which occurred on 2 November 1864.

He married Eliza, daughter of James Richard Bolton, an attorney, of Long Acre, Westminster, and younger sister of Mary Catherine, an actress at Covent Garden Theatre, who married Edward Hovell-Thurlow, 2nd Baron Thurlow.

Bingham's son, also Peregrine Bingham, of The Abbey, Woodbridge, Suffolk, was educated at Jesus College, Cambridge and became perpetual curate of Flamstead, Hertfordshire.

== Works ==
His works are:

- The Law and Practice of Judgments and Executions, including extents at the suit of the Crown. London. 1815. 8vo.
- The Law of Infancy and Coverture. London. 1816. 8vo. First American edition. Exeter, United States. 1824. 8vo. Second American edition. Burlington. 1849.
- A Digest of the Law of Landlord and Tenant. London. 1820. 8vo.
- A System of Shorthand, on the principle of the Association of Ideas. London. 1821. 8vo. Thompson Cooper described this as "a stenographic system of no practical value".
- "Reports of Cases argued and determined in the Court of Common Pleas and in other Courts", from Easter term 1819 to Michaelmas term 1840. 19 vols. London. 1821-40. 8vo. The first three volumes of these reports were compiled jointly with W. J. Broderip.

He edited Jeremy Bentham's Book of Fallacies.
