= Peregrine Bingham the Elder =

Biographer and poet

Peregrine Bingham, the elder (1754–1826) was an English biographer and poet.

== Life ==
Of the gentry family of Bingham of Melcombe Bingham, Dorset, recorded since the time of Henry I, he was the son of George Bingham, B.D., rector of Pimperne, Dorset. He was educated at, and was later a Fellow of, New College, Oxford (B.C.L. 1780); became rector of Edmondsham, Dorset, in 1782, and of Berwick St. John, Wiltshire, in 1817. At one time he was chaplain of HMS Agincourt. He died on 28 May 1826, aged 72.

By his wife Amy, daughter of William Bowles, he was the father of Peregrine Bingham the younger.

== Works ==
He wrote Memoirs of his father, prefixed to Dissertations, Essays, and Sermons, by the late George Bingham, B.D., 2 vols., 1804. These Memoirs, which are abridged in John Hutchins' Dorset, new edition, gave rise to a controversy between the author and the rector of Critchill. Bingham also wrote The Pains of Memory, a poem, in two books, London, 1811; 2nd ed., with vignettes, 1812.
