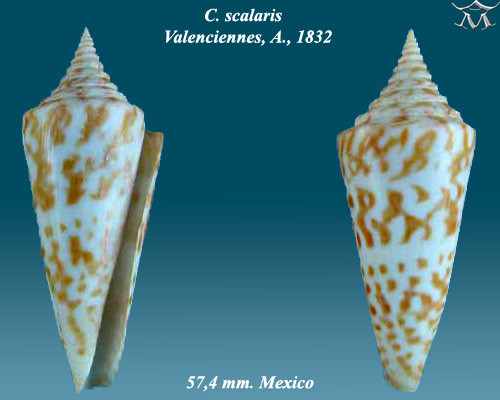
- Apertural and abapertural views of shell of Conus scalaris Valenciennes, 1832
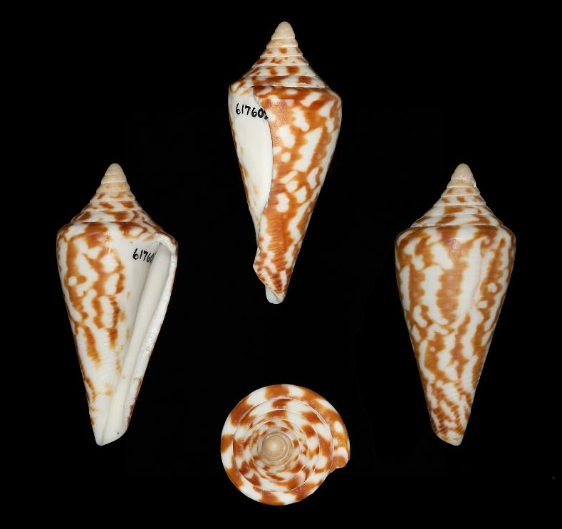

Conservation status
- Least Concern (IUCN 3.1)

Scientific classification
- Kingdom: Animalia
- Phylum: Mollusca
- Class: Gastropoda
- Subclass: Caenogastropoda
- Order: Neogastropoda
- Superfamily: Conoidea
- Family: Conidae
- Genus: Conus
- Species: C. scalaris

Binomial name
- Conus scalaris Valenciennes, 1832

Synonyms
- Conus (Dauciconus) scalaris Valenciennes, 1832 · accepted, alternate representation; Conus recurvus var. helenae Schwengel, 1955; Gradiconus scalaris (Valenciennes, 1832); Lithoconus recurvus helenae Schwengel, J.S., 1955

= Conus scalaris =

Species of sea snail

Conus scalaris, commonly known as the ladder cone, is a species of sea snail, a marine gastropod mollusc in the family Conidae, the cone snails and their allies.

Like all species within the genus Conus, these marine snails are predatory and venomous. They are capable of stinging humans; therefore, live specimens should be handled carefully or not at all.

== Description ==
The size of the shell varies between 23 mm and 80 mm. The elevated spire is gradate and maculated with chestnut. The body whorl is somewhat acuminate below The shell is yellowish white with brown-chestnut longitudinal striations, scarcely interrupted for a narrow central white band, and replaced towards the base by a few revolving rows of chestnut markings.

== Distribution ==
This marine species occurs in the Pacific Ocean off Baja California to Costa Rica
