= William Broderip =

English lawyer and naturalist

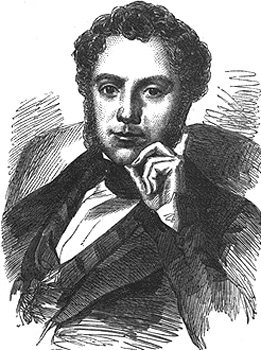
William John Broderip.

William John Broderip FRS (21 November 1789 – 27 February 1859) was an English lawyer and naturalist.

== Life ==
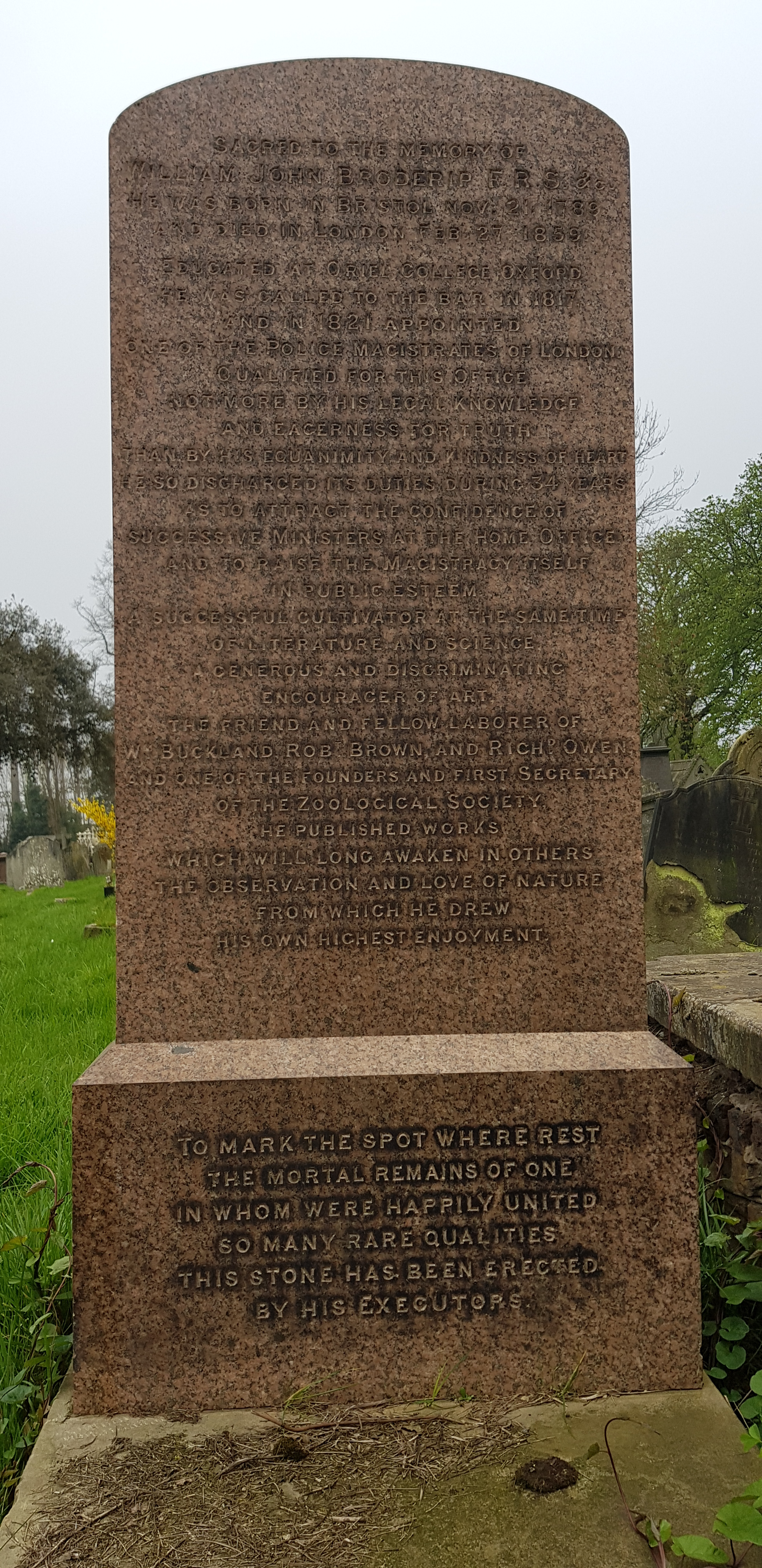
Broderip's grave at Kensal Green Cemetery

Broderip, the eldest son of William Broderip, surgeon from Bristol, was born at Bristol on 21 November 1789, and, after being educated at Bristol Grammar School under Samuel Seyer, matriculated at Oriel College, Oxford, and graduated BA in 1812. At college he attended the anatomical lectures of Sir Christopher Pegge, and the chemical and mineralogical lectures of Dr. John Kidd. After completing his university education, he entered the Inner Temple, and studied in the chambers of Godfrey Sykes, where he had as contemporaries John Patteson and John Taylor Coleridge. He was called to the bar at Lincoln's Inn on 12 May 1817, when he joined the western circuit. In 1822 he accepted from Lord Sidmouth the appointment of magistrate at the Thames police court. He held this office until 1846, when he was transferred to the Westminster court, where he remained for ten years. He was compelled to resign from deafness, He was elected bencher of Gray's Inn 30 January 1850, and treasurer 29 January 1851, and was librarian there.

Broderip throughout his life was an enthusiastic collector, particularly of shells. His collection was ultimately purchased by the British Museum. He was elected a fellow of the Linnean Society in 1824, of the Geological Society in 1825, and of the Royal Society on 14 February 1828. In co-operation with Sir Stamford Raffles he aided, in 1826, in the formation of the Zoological Society, of which he was one of the original fellows. He was secretary of the Geological Society for some time, with Roderick Murchison until 1830.

He died in his chambers, 2 Raymond Buildings, Gray's Inn, London, from an attack of serous apoplexy, on 27 February 1859. He is buried in Kensal Green Cemetery, London.

== Works ==
Shortly after 1817, with Peregrine Bingham, he began reporting in the court of common pleas. These reports were published in three volumes in 1820–22. In 1824 he edited the fourth edition of Robert Callis upon the Statute of Sewers.

To the Transactions of the Geological Society Broderip contributed numerous papers; but the chief part of his original writings on malacology are to be found in the Proceedings and Transactions of the Zoological Society. Broderip's Account of the Manners of a Tame Beaver, published in the Gardens and Menagerie of the Zoological Society, affords an example of his tact as an observer and power as a writer. His contributions to the New Monthly Magazine and to Fraser's Magazine were collected in the volumes entitled Zoological Recreations, 1847, and Leaves from the Note-book of a Naturalist, 1852. He wrote the zoological articles in the Penny Cyclopædia, viz. from Ast to the end, including the whole of the articles relating to mammals, birds, reptiles, crustacea, mollusca, conchifera, pulmonata, &c.; Buffon, Brisson, &c., and zoology. His last publication, On the Shark, appeared in Fraser's Magazine, March 1859.

Besides numerous articles in magazines, newspapers, and reviews, his books include:

1. Guide to the Gardens of the Zoological Society. By Nicholas A. Vigors and W. J. Broderip 1829
2. Hints for collecting Animals and their Products 1832
3. Memoir of the Dodo. By R. Owen, F.R.S., with an Historical Introduction by W. J. Broderip 1861
