= Akers v Samba Financial Group =

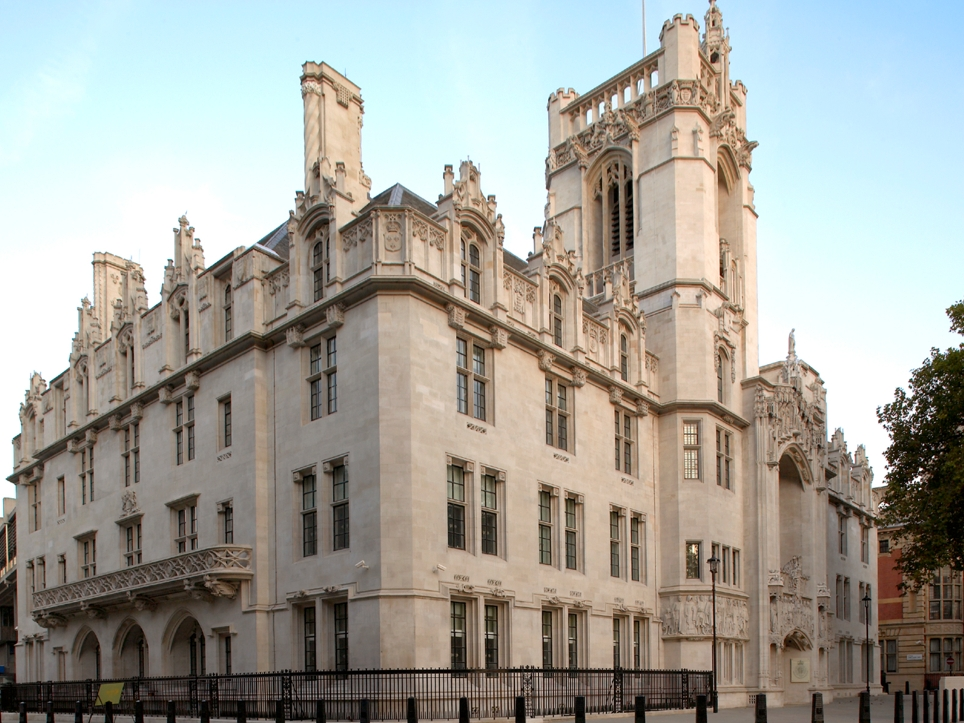
- The Supreme Court
- Court: Supreme Court
- Full case name: (1) Stephen Akers, Mark Byers, Hugh Dickson (as joint liquidators of Saad Investments Company Limited) and (2) Saad Investments Company Limited (in liquidation) v Samba Financial Group
- Decided: 1 February 2017
- Citations: [2017] BCLC 151 [2017] UKSC 6 [2017] BPIR 263 [2017] WLR(D) 57 [2017] 2 WLR 713 [2017] 2 All ER (Comm) 97 [2017] 2 All ER 799 [2017] WLR 1261 [2017] AC 424 [2017] WTLR 373
- Transcripts: BAILII; UKSC

Case history
- Appealed from: [2014] EWCA Civ 1516 [2014] EWHC 540 (Ch)
- Subsequent actions: Byers v Saudi National Bank [2023] UKSC 51 [2022] EWCA Civ 43 [2021] EWHC 60 (Ch)

Court membership
- Judges sitting: Lord Neuberger; Lord Mance; Lord Sumption; Lord Toulson; Lord Collins

Case opinions
- Decision by: Lord Mance
- Concurrence: Lord Neuberger, Lord Sumption and Lord Collins
- Dissent: None

Keywords
- conflict of laws; insolvency; trusts; fraudulent transfer

Akers v Samba Financial Group [2017] UKSC 6, [2017] AC 424 is a judicial decision of the Supreme Court of the United Kingdom relating to the conflict of laws, trust law and insolvency law.

The key issues in the litigation evolved significantly during the appeals process, meaning that the issues addressed by the Supreme Court differed from those considered by the Court of Appeal, which in turn were different from those which were considered at first instance by the Vice Chancellor. However, by the time the case reached the Supreme Court the core issue was whether a transfer of trust property to a bona fide purchaser for value without notice, which extinguished the beneficial interest of a company in liquidation, was void as a "disposition of property" after the commencement of winding up.

The case involved consideration of several issues of law which the Supreme Court described as "novel and difficult".

The appeal was heard against an application to determine a preliminary issue. Accordingly, for the purposes of the hearing the allegations were assumed to be true. The Supreme Court held that the claim should be either stayed or struck out, but deferred making an order as to which pending further representations from the parties.

== Facts ==
Mr Al-Sanea was a citizen and resident of Saudi Arabia, and he was closely involved with a Cayman Islands company, Saad Investments Co Ltd (SICL). At the time of the proceedings SICL was in liquidation in the Cayman Islands, and represented by its liquidators. Those legal proceedings had been subject to a recognition order in the English courts.

Mr Al-Sanea was the registered legal owner of shares in five Saudi Arabian banks, valued at around US$318 million. SICL claims that Mr Al-Sanea had agreed to hold these shares on trust for SICL. The trusts were claimed to arise from six transactions under which Mr Al-Sanea had agreed in writing to hold the shares on trust for SICL.

On 16 September 2009, Mr Al-Sanea transferred all the Saudi Arabian shares to the Samba Financial Group (Samba), purporting thereby to discharge his personal liabilities towards Samba. The law of Saudi Arabia, where the shares are legally situated, does not recognise the institution of trust or a division between legal and equitable proprietary interests.

The proceedings were brought by SICL and its liquidators against Samba in the English courts. They established jurisdiction by serving Samba's London branch. In the proceedings they claimed that the purported transfer of the shares was void under section 127 of the Insolvency Act 1986, and the shares beneficially belonged to SICL for the benefit of its creditors.

Samba opposed the application on a number of legal and procedural grounds. Although the liquidation was conducted under Cayman Islands law, it was common ground in the proceedings that once the insolvency proceedings had been recognised, section 127 would apply to any subsequent disposition of SICL's property.

== Judgments ==
=== High Court ===
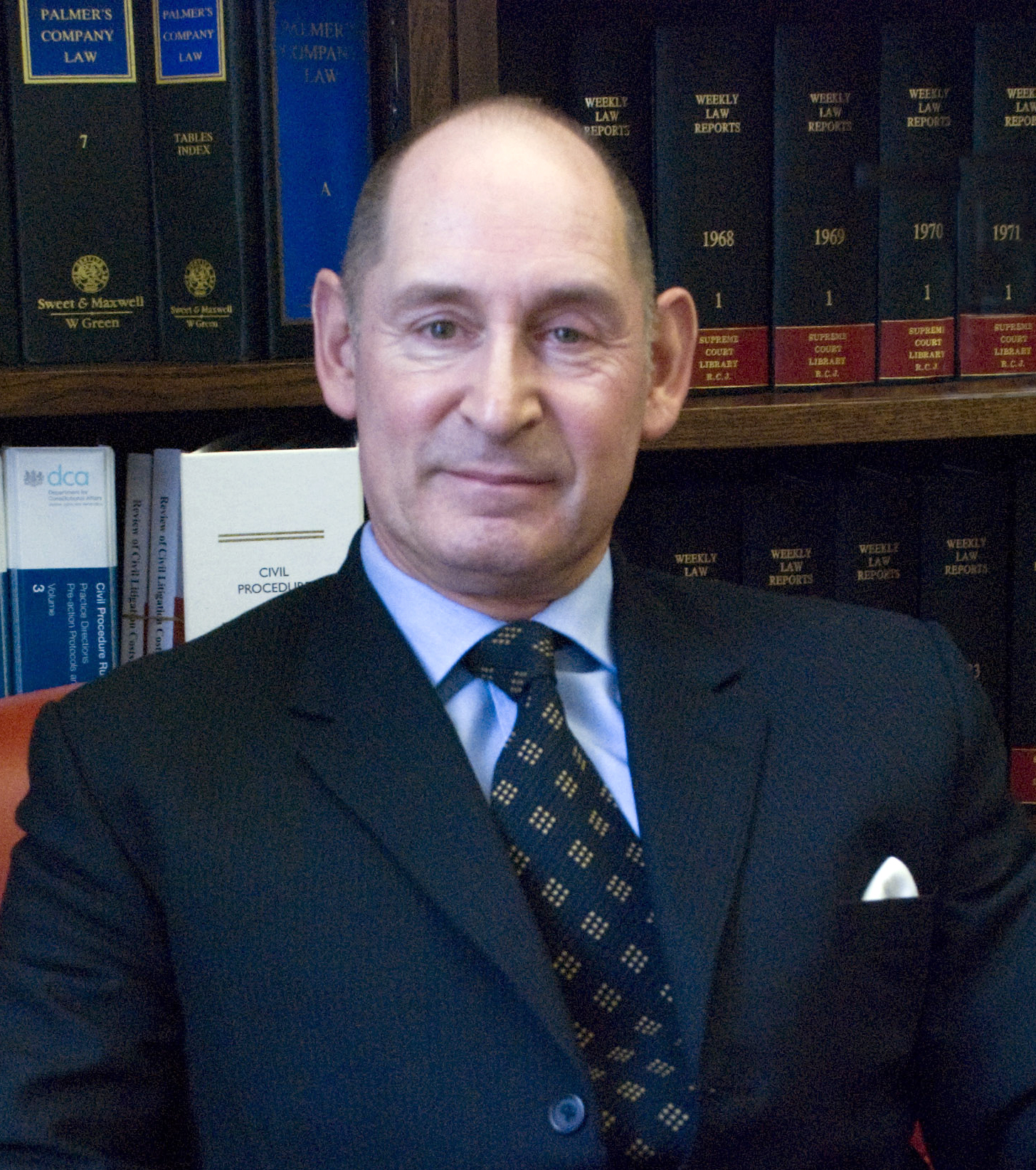
Sir Terence Etherton

In the High Court the case came before the Vice Chancellor, Sir Terence Etherton.

He noted that Samba was a Saudi bank, but had been served with English legal proceedings through its London branch. Before Sir Terence the case was fought principally on the basis that the proceedings in England should be subject to stay under the doctrine of forum non conveniens, i.e. that the English courts were not the most appropriate courts to hear this case, and that the case should properly be determined by the Saudi courts as the case related to title to shares in Saudi companies.

Sir Terence held that, for the reasons set out in his judgment a stay should be granted.

The liquidators appealed to the Court of Appeal.

=== Court of Appeal ===
In the Court of Appeal the case came before Longmore, Kitchin and Vos LJJ.

Judgment was given by Vos LJ, who noted that "The argument before this court has also been markedly different from the argument before the Chancellor. Before us, the focus has been on the meaning and effect of article 4 of the [Hague Trust] Convention, whereas that article played almost no part in the first instance hearing." The Court of Appeal noted:

... the appeal raises some important questions as to the law applicable to and the validity of trusts which purport to comprise shares registered in civil law countries, whose laws do not themselves recognise either the trust concept or the division of a legal and beneficial interest. These questions have involved a close analysis of the Hague Convention on the Law Applicable to Trusts and on their Recognition (the "Convention"), which was given statutory effect in the United Kingdom by the Recognition of Trusts Act 1987 (the "1987 Act").

The Court of Appeal reversed the decision, and held that the matter could proceed to trial. Samba appealed to the Supreme Court.

=== Supreme Court ===
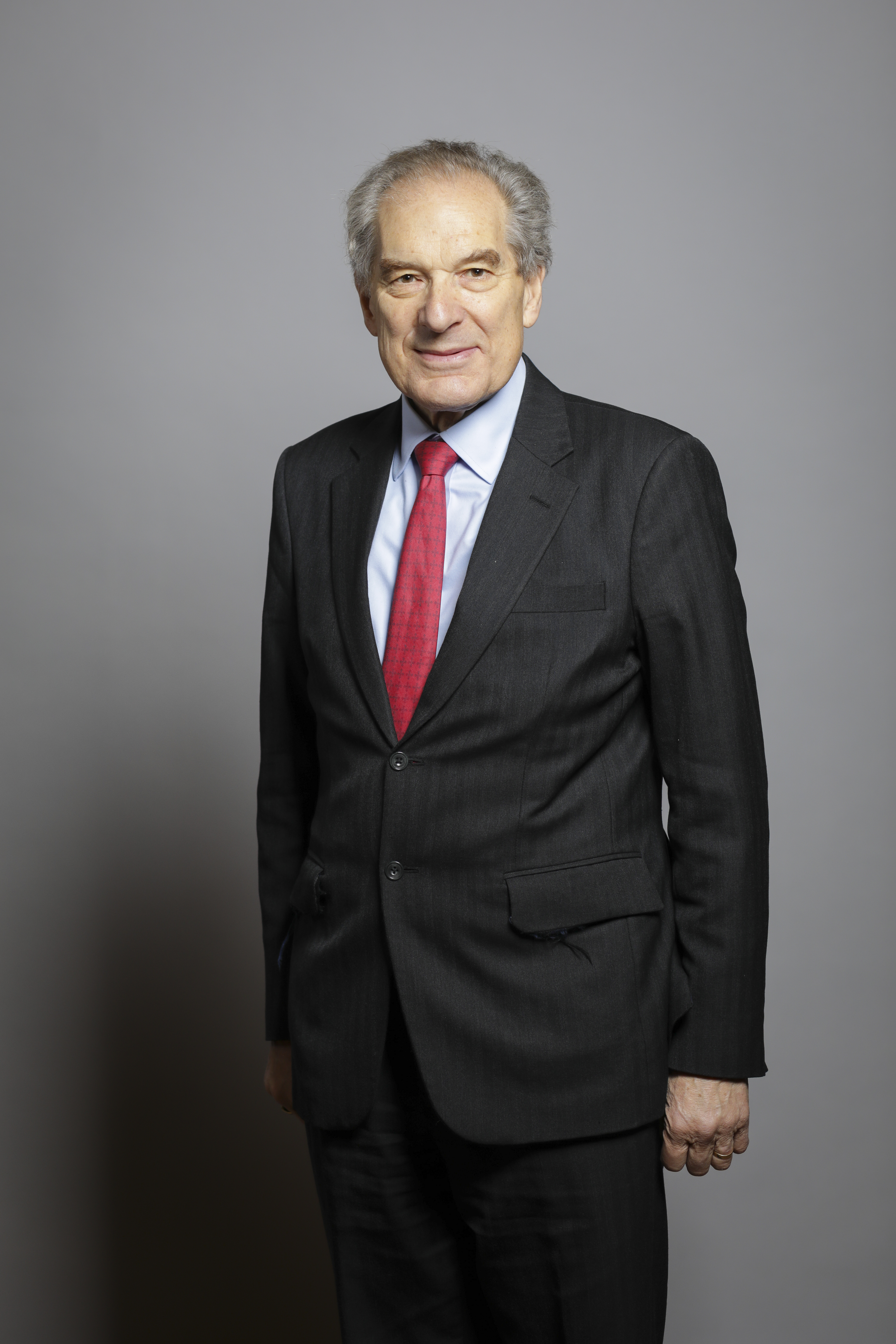
Lord Mance.

Before the Supreme Court the nature of the arguments had evolved once again. The main judgment was given by Lord Mance, with whom all members of the court agreed. Short concurring judgments were given by Lord Neuberger, Lord Sumption and Lord Collins. Whilst Lord Mance dealt with the primary issue (relating to section 127), most of the concurring judgments largely commented on ancillary issues of wider law which related to the broader issues in the case.

In the Supreme Court the primary issue was whether the overreaching of a beneficial interest in trust property by the trustee transferring it to a bona fide purchaser for value without notice amounted to a "disposition" for the purposes of section 127 of the Insolvency Act 1986. If so, then it would be void unless the court otherwise ordered. Samba argued that extinguishing an equitable interest in this manner was not a disposition. It simply meant that equity would no longer recognise a right in the beneficiary that formerly existed.

==== Lord Mance (paras 1 - 59) ====
After setting out the facts and the history, Lord Mance referenced the specific statutory provisions in issue: section 127 and section 436 of the Insolvency Act 1986. Those provisions state:

127. Avoidance of property dispositions, etc.

In a winding up by the court, any disposition of the company's property, and any transfer of shares, or alteration in the status of the company's members, made after the commencement of the winding up is, unless the court otherwise orders, void. ...

...

436.

'property' includes money, goods, things in action, land and every description of property wherever situated and also obligations and every description of interest, whether present or future or vested or contingent, arising out of, or incidental to, property; ...

He then reviewed the position in relation to the Convention on the Law Applicable to Trusts and on their Recognition, which was brought into force in the United Kingdom pursuant to the Recognition of Trusts Act 1987. But then largely dismissed that as background, noting: "In the light of the further and more broadly ranging submissions which the Supreme Court has now received, I doubt if it matters for present purposes either whether the Convention applies or even whether SICL's interests in relation to the shares can properly be described as proprietary. The limited focus in the courts below, on the issue whether the trusts gave SICL equitable proprietary interests in the shares, is largely subsumed in a more general question whether, whatever the nature of SICL's interests under the trusts, there was any disposition of property within the meaning of section 127."

He proceeded to review the law as to what constitutes property, with particular reference to equitable interests. He noted that whether or not a transfer of property defeated any equitable interest was a matter for the lex situs of the relevant property (so, in this case, Saudi Arabia as the place where the shares were located).

He noted that in Attorney General v Jewish Colonization Association [1901] 1 QB 123 and Duke of Marlborough v Attorney General [1945] 1 Ch 78 it was held that foreign shares which were held on trust were taxable as on a succession. The Succession Duty Act 1853 provided: "every past, or future disposition of property ... shall be deemed to confer ... 'a succession'", and the courts had held these general words applied to the trust property even though the property consisted of foreign shares. He also referred to British South Africa Co v De Beers Consolidated Mines Ltd [1910] 2 Ch 502 where the Court of Appeal held that the equitable rule against clogging the equity of redemption of a mortgage applied to a contract governed by English law and would be enforced against a contracting party as regards land abroad in a foreign country where the equity of redemption may not be recognised. He also referred more broaldy to the rule in Penn v Lord Baltimore (1750) 1 Ves Sen 444, and the recent application of the rule in Lightning v Lightning Electrical Contractors Ltd (1998) 23(1) Tru LI 35 and Luxe Holding Ltd v Midland Resources Holding Ltd [2010] EWHC 1908 (Ch).

Lord Mance then readily conceded: "I have found this a difficult issue." He then turned to consider various academic opinions, including in particular Professor William Swadling of Oxford University. He approved a statement by Swadling in Burrows (ed.), English Private Law, at para 4.149 regarding "the falsity of statements which talk in terms of a 'division' or 'separation' of rights when rights are held on trust, or even worse, of legal and equitable 'titles' existing before the creation of the trust." But he refused to be drawn into the deeper academic debate: "It is unnecessary on this appeal to examine these slightly differing analyses further. What is clear, on any analysis, is that, where a trust exists, the legal and beneficial interests are distinct, and what affects the former does not necessarily affect the latter."

Finally he concluded:

53. In these circumstances, I conclude that section 127 is neither aimed at, nor apt to cover, the present situation. Section 127 addresses cases where assets legally owned by a company in winding up are disposed of. The section is necessary to enable the company to recover them, by treating the disposition as void. The court's power to validate the disposition is a necessary safety valve, to cater for situations in which validation would be appropriate, bearing in mind the position of creditors as well as that of the other party to the transaction. Any such disposition will involve issues which arise directly between the company (embracing in that concept its creditors in liquidation) whose property is disposed of and the other party to the transaction, although the section embraces situations where the company's property is held by, for example, a director or agent and is disposed of by him to a third party: In re J Leslie Engineers Co Ltd [1976] 1 WLR 292.

54. The holder of interests such as SICL's does not need protection on the lines of section 127, in order to protect its property or to protect or enforce its interests. Mr Al-Sanea disposed of his legal interest in the shares. That involved him in a breach of trust. But it did not involve any disposition of SICL's property.

He added that: "In some circumstances, the term "disposition" may, as Lord Neuberger demonstrates, embrace destruction or extinction of an interest. ... But the natural meaning of "disposition" in the context of section 127 is in my view that it refers to a transfer by a disponor to a disponee of the relevant property".

He directed that the appeal be allowed and the case remitted back to the High Court for directions. He noted that this would enable an application to be made, if appropriate, to save the proceedings by amendment of the pleadings.

==== Lord Neuberger (paras 58 - 78) ====
Lord Neuberger summarised the facts briefly, and then turned to the direct issue in the case as to whether the overreaching of the beneficial interest in trust property could be a "disposition" for the purposes section 127 of the Insolvency Act 1986. He stated that: "There is no doubt but that SICL's equitable interest in the shares constituted "property" in the light of the very wide definition of that expression in section 436 of the 1986 Act, which is set out in para 7 of Lord Mance's judgment. He cited with approval what Sir Nicolas Browne-Wilkinson V-C said in Bristol Airport Plc v Powdrill [1990] Ch 744, 759, "[i]t is hard to think of a wider definition of property"."

But the bigger issue was whether overreaching is a disposition. He noticed overreaching is "where a legal estate is sold to a bona fide purchaser for value without notice, any equitable interest is not transferred to the purchaser: it is overridden, or to put it more colloquially, it is lost or disappears". He expressed his view that the word "disposition" is linguistically capable of applying to a transaction which involves the destruction or termination of an interest. (Lord Mance had issued some partial support for this proposition, but Lord Sumption would expressly state his disagreement with it in his own judgment.) He claimed academic support for such a view, citing Professor Sir Roy Goode in Principles of Corporate Insolvency Law (4th ed (2011) at para 13–127). He also drew support from Wynn-Parry J in In re Earl Leven, Inland Revenue Comrs v Williams Deacon's Bank Ltd [1954] 1 WLR 1228, 1233.

Having considered that point obiter dictum, he indicated: "I have reached the conclusion, in agreement with Lord Mance, that there is no "disposition" of an equitable interest within section 127, when there is a transfer by the legal owner of the legal estate, which is subject to that equitable interest, to a bona fide purchaser for value without notice of that equitable interest."

==== Lord Sumption (paras 79 - 82) ====
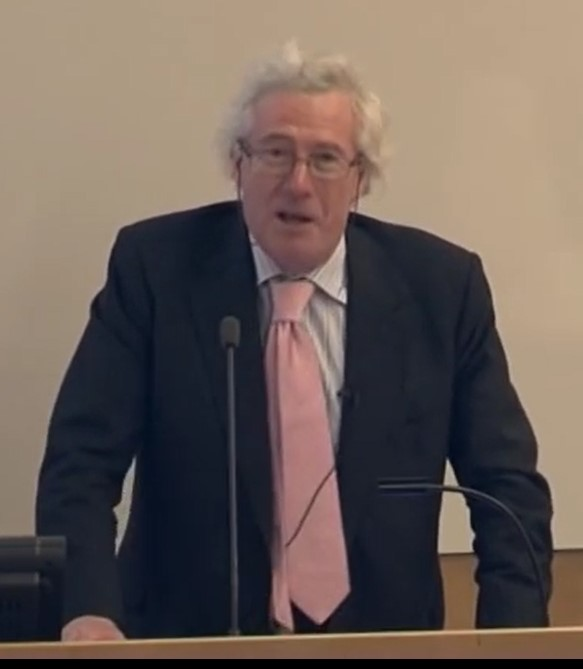
Lord Sumption.

Lord Sumption also commented on the evolution of the case - from a forum non conveniens application, to an appeal in relation to the effects of the Hague Convention in front of the Court of Appeal, to deciding the issue on the basis of the extra territorial effect on section 127 in the Supreme Court.

He then proceeded to review much of the background law in relation to the fact pattern, noting that as the beneficiary of a trust, SICL had two main legal rights. First, it had a right to have the trust administered according to its terms - a personal right against the trustee. Secondly, SICL had a true proprietary right. He noted that the proprietary character of an equitable interest in property has sometimes been doubted, but an equitable interest possesses the essential hallmark of any right in rem, and it is enforceable against third parties, subject to the rules of equity for the protection of bona fide purchasers for value without notice, per Westdeutsche Landesbank Girozentrale v Islington London Borough Council [1996] AC 669, 705.

He then considered what, as a matter of the conflict of laws, which law should determine recognition of an equitable interest. Normally, he noted, it will be the lex situs. This would be obvious in the case of land, but is equally true of shares. Shares in a company are legal rights against that company, dependent on the law of its incorporation. The principle is the same as that which applies where a person assumes a contractual obligation to transfer an interest which is incapable of existing under the lex situs. He approved the statement by Lord Hodge in In re Joint Administrators of Rangers Football Club Plc 2012 SLT 599, para 19: "while the contractual aspects of a contract to assign corporeal moveables are governed by the law applicable to the contractual obligation, the final question of proprietary right must be determined by the lex situs."

But that deals with the second of the two rights (the right in rem). The first right (the personal right against the trustee) remains effective to create personal rights against the trustee even if the lex situs does not recognise the proprietary claim. He referred to El Ajou v Dollar Land Holdings plc [1993] BCC 698, 715–716. The liability of the constructive trustee was unaffected by any issue as to existence of rights in rem. SICL's problem was not that it lacked a beneficial interest in the shares, but that Mr Al-Sanea did not dispose of that beneficial interest by transferring the shares to Samba. Mr Al-Sanea purported to transfer the legal interest to Samba. That was the only interest that he had. He did not purport to dispose of SICL's interest. Only SICL could do that, and it did not do so.

He noted that it is arguable (as Lord Neuberger had observed), that the transfer of the legal interest in movables may constitute a "disposition" of an equitable interest if its effect is that the equitable interest is extinguished. But Lord Sumption indicated that he would reject it is because of equity's recognition that in some circumstances the conscience of the holder of the legal interest may be affected.

He affirmed: "The reality is that the transaction of 16 September 2009 was simply a transfer of the shares in breach of trust, and any rights of SICL against Samba depend on the law relating to constructive trusts and not on section 127 of the Insolvency Act."

Finally he concluded that "for the purpose of section 127 of the Insolvency Act 1986 there was no disposition of any rights of SICL in relation to the shares by virtue of their transfer to Samba. Logically, it follows that the proceedings should be struck out. But I would remit the matter to the High Court to deal with any consequential matters, in case it be contended that they can be saved by an appropriate amendment to the pleadings." Thus raising the possibility that the claim could be saved by an amendment to the pleadings.

==== Lord Collins (paras 93 - 103) ====
Lord Collins noted the unfortunate way that the arguments had evolved, to the extent that leave was given to appeal to the Supreme Court on one ground, and then largely argued on another. He said that "in the light of the way the claim was formulated, the real question was not one of the proper exercise of judicial jurisdiction, but rather a question of legislative jurisdiction, namely the extra-territorial scope of section 127 of the Insolvency Act 1986 and its application to the shares. The combined effect of sections 127 and 436 of the Insolvency Act 1986 is that the avoidance provisions of section 127 apply to property "wherever situated".

He expanded that "For the reasons given by Lord Mance, I do not consider that there was any "disposition" of SICL's property" and so "It follows that the scope and effect of the Hague Convention do not fall to be decided."

Finally he added that there "has never been any suggestion in the authorities that an effective declaration of trust could not be made over shares in a company incorporated, or shares registered, in a country which does not recognise the trust concept. Attorney General v Jewish Colonisation Association [1901] 1 QB 123 and Duke of Marlborough v Attorney General [1945] Ch 78 are only indirect authority, but they have been, correctly, regarded as recognising English trusts over foreign shares irrespective of whether the place of incorporation or place of registration recognises the trust concept." Although those comments were not germaine to the decision, Lord Collins felt that those comments were worth making given the importance of the underlying subject matter.

== Subsequent litigation ==
After the decision, the path of the litigation continued in the Byers v Samba Financial Group [2021] EWHC 60 (Ch) in which the liquidators sought to bring knowing receipt claims against Samba. Those claims were dismissed by Fancourt J at first instance, whose conclusions were upheld on appeal in the court of appeal ([2022] EWCA Civ 43) and in the Supreme Court ([2024] UKSC 51).

== Reception ==
=== Textbooks ===
The decision of the Supreme Court was handed down after the most recent edition of Dicey Morris & Collins (the 15th, published in 2012). But in their 2018 annual supplement, the editors cited the decision with approval in relation to a number of statements of law, including (1) the principle that it is possible to have a trust over property (in that case, shares) located in a jurisdiction which does not have or recognise the concept of a trust, (2) the question of whether the transfer had overridden the beneficiary's trust rights was determined by the lex situs, and (3) where a settlor had purported to declare himself trustee of shares located in Saudi Arabia pursuant to certain Cayman law trusts and then transferred those shares to a party in Saudi Arabia, Saudi law would determine whether the effect of the transfer was to defeat the beneficiary's trust rights; but this conclusion should be reached by the application of Article 11(3)(d) of the Hague Trust Convention and not pursuant to the Article 15(1).

Similarly, the Supreme Court's ruling post-dated the most recent edition of Cheshire North & Fawcett (15th edition, 2017). But the editors cite the decision of the Court of Appeal with approval, but without specifically referring to the details of the decision.

Clarkson & Hill do not refer to the decision at all in their most recent edition (5th, published in 2016).

=== Articles ===
The case was reviewed at length in an article in the Law Quarterly Review by Sinéad Agnew and Ben McFarlane. The authors reviewed the wider role of equitable rights and trusts in the conflict of laws, but with particularly reference to the judgment of Lord Sumption, and the distinction between what they referred to as a "relational view" of equitable rights, and the "proprietary view" of trusts and equitable interests.

Another review by Professor Jonathan Harris QC was published in Trusts & Trustees. He noted that although the case was disposed of on other grounds, he analysed the obiter comments made by the bench in the Supreme Court relating to the Hague Trusts Convention, expressing some concern over some of the comments noting "Lord Sumption's statement is not complete or entirely correct" with respect to the convention, and arguing that "the Convention has been, and has the potential to be, of substantially greater significance, both in common law and civilian states, than the judgments in Akers v Samba might suggest".

In a separate article in Trusts & Trustees, Daniel Harris called the decision "hard to digest".

== Subsequent decisions ==
Akers v Samba has been cited with approval in a subsequent case in the same litigation: Byers v Saudi National Bank [2024] UKSC 51.

== Sources ==
- Collins, Lawrence (2012). Dicey, Morris & Collins: The Conflict of Laws (15th ed.). Sweet & Maxwell. ISBN 978-0-414-02453-3.
- Hill, Jonathan (2016). Clarkson & Hill's Conflict of Laws (5th ed.). OUP. ISBN 978-0-19-873229-7.
- Torremans, Paul (2017). Cheshire, North & Fawcett: Private International Law (15th ed.). OUP. ISBN 978-0-19-967899-0.
