= Byers v Saudi National Bank =

United Kingdom legal decision

Byers v The Saudi National Bank
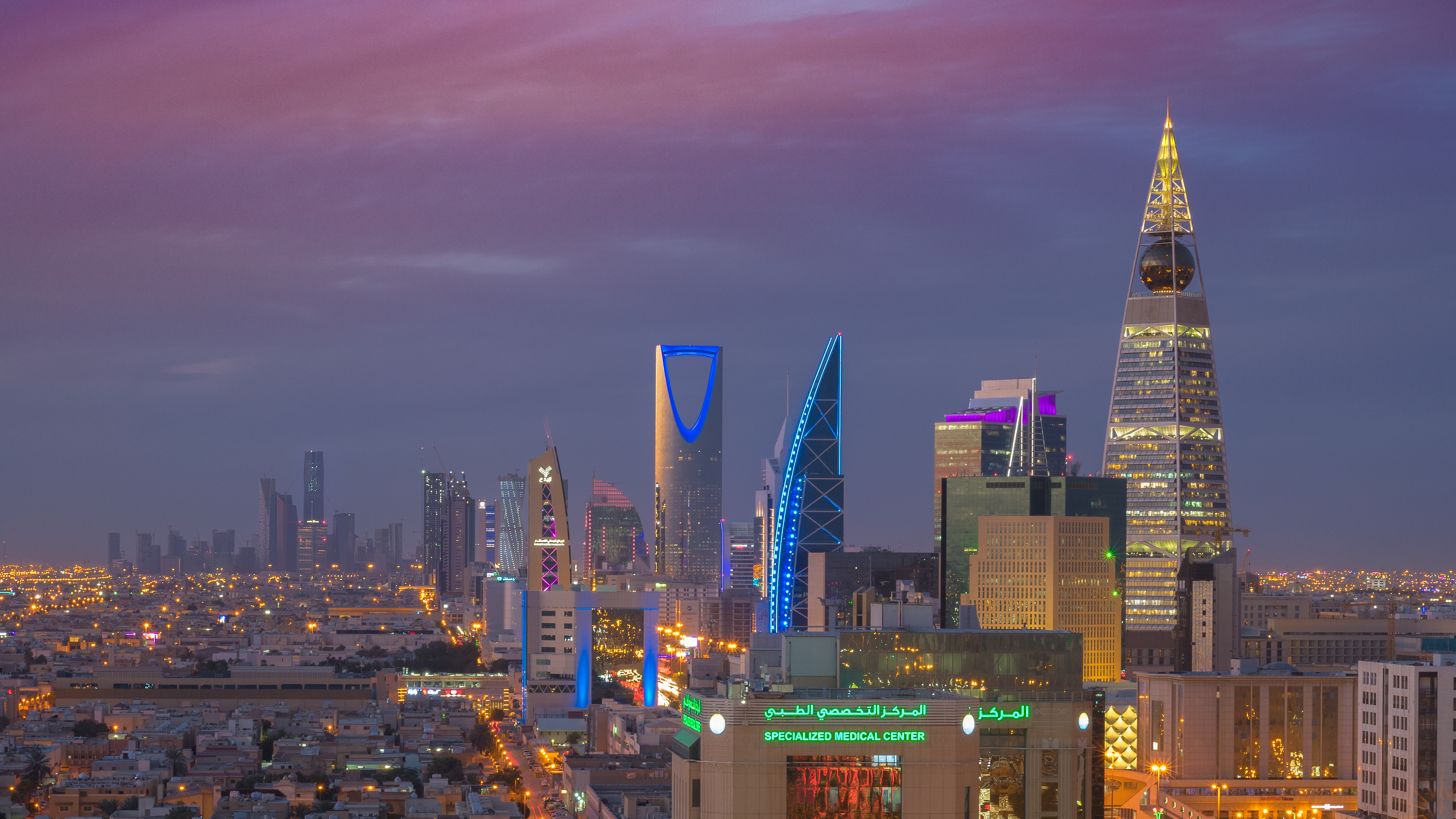
- Riyadh
- Court: Supreme Court of the United Kingdom
- Full case name: (1) Mark Byers, (2) Hugh Dickson and (3) SAAD Investments Company Limited (in liquidation) v The Saudi National Bank
- Decided: 20 December 2023
- Citation: [2023] UKSC 51
- Transcript: BAILII

Case history
- Appealed from: [2022] EWCA Civ 43 [2021] EWHC 60 (Ch)

Court membership
- Judges sitting: Lord Hodge; Lord Briggs; Lord Leggatt; Lord Burrows; Lord Stephens

Keywords
- knowing receipt; dishonest assistance; proof of foreign law; share valuations

Byers v Saudi National Bank [2023] UKSC 51 is a decision of the Supreme Court of the United Kingdom in the long running litigation between the liquidators of SAAD Investments Company Limited and various parties relating to the alleged defrauding of the insolvent company by one of its principals.

The issues which the Supreme Court had to determine were limited because of certain procedural irregularities in the way that the defendant, the Samba Financial Group, had conducted its defence. However, the central allegation was that the bank had knowingly received certain very valuable securities in Saudi Arabian companies which were beneficially owned by SAAD Investments Company Limited in breach of trust. However, because Saudi Arabian law did not recognise the concept of a trust, and did not have a system of conflict of laws, the defendants argued that the claim must necessarily fail.

The defendants succeeded in the Supreme Court, as they had in the High Court and in the Court of Appeal below.

== Background ==
On or about 16 September 2009 Mr Maan Al-Sanea was alleged to have transferred a substantial number of shares and securities issued to the Samba Financial Group to discharge his liabilities to the group. However, Mr Al-Sanea held those shares in his personal name on trust for SAAD Investment Company Limited ("SICL"). On the day of the transfer they were valued at 801 million Saudi riyals (approximately US$250 million). Shortly afterwards SICL went into liquidation in the Cayman Islands.

A raft of litigation then ensued, but most importantly the liquidators brought claims against Samba alleging that the transfers by Mr Al-Sanea were void under the provisions of section 127 of the Insolvency Act 1986. The courts were asked to determine the availability of relief as a preliminary issue of law and that litigation went all the way to the Supreme Court which ruled that the transactions could not, as a matter of law, be set aside under section 127.

The liquidators of SICL amended their claim accordingly, and proceeded against Samba Financial Group, including a claim in knowing receipt, alleging that Samba Financial Group knew or ought to have known that the shares were held on trust for SICL, and so either had to restore them or pay over their value. In particular, SICL pointed out that Samba must be taken to know this because (i) Mr Al-Senea was also a director of Samba, and so his personal knowledge would be imputed to them, and (ii) because Samba had been given notice of a worldwide freezing order which been granted in relation to the relevant securities.

However, because Samba did not comply with various orders for disclosure during the litigation it was debarred from defending various issues, and those were treated as having been proved. Accordingly, when the case came back before the court for a substantive hearing, there were only three remaining issues which the court had to determine. They were referred to as:

1. "the Saudi Arabian Law Issue";
2. "the Law of Knowing Receipt Issue"; and
3. "the Valuation Issue".

These were all issues of pure law which the Samba Group could argue despite being debarred from disputing the underlying facts.

On 1 April 2021 all of the assets of the Samba Group were transferred to the Saudi National Bank, who was substituted as defendant in the proceedings.

== High Court ==
The case came before Fancourt J. Before the High Court there were essentially three issues to be determined:

- Firstly, was it necessary for the claimants to have an equitable interest in the relevant shares once they were in the hands of the Saudi Bank in order to sustain a claim for 'knowing receipt'.
- Secondly, whether Saudi Arabian law (as the law of the place where the shares were deemed to be located) would recognise or give effect to the equitable title of SICL in the shares after the transfer.
- Thirdly, if the claimants succeeded, to what extent their damages should reflect a 'block discount' which would be applicable to the sale or purchase of such a large number of shares in one company.

The High Court held that:

1. A claim for knowing receipt could only succeed under English law (or Cayman law, which was accepted to be identical) if the claimants could show that they had a beneficial interest in the shares once they were in the hands of the Saudi Bank;
2. that the effect of the expert evidence on Saudi law was to the effect that Saudi law did not recognise their trust interest, and so it was extinguished by the transfer to the Saudi Bank, and therefore the claim failed; and
3. although it was no longer relevant, the judge set out the basis upon which he would have applied a partial block discount to the share valuation if he had been required to do so.

== Court of Appeal ==
The Court of Appeal consisted of Newey LJ, Asplin LJ and Popplewell LJ. Newey LJ delivered a single judgment, but it was expressed to be the judgment of the entire court.

=== The 'Knowing Receipt' Issue ===
The court began by citing the well known dictum of Lord Selborne LC in Barnes v Addy (1874) LR 9 Ch App 244, at 251-252:

"[The responsibility of a trustee] may no doubt be extended in equity to others who are not properly trustees, if they are found either making themselves trustees de son tort, or actually participating in any fraudulent conduct of the trustee to the injury of the cestui que trust. But, on the other hand, strangers are not to be made constructive trustees merely because they act as the agents of trustees in transactions within their legal powers, transactions, perhaps of which a Court of Equity may disapprove, unless those agents receive and become chargeable with some part of the trust property, or unless they assist with knowledge in a dishonest and fraudulent design on the part of the trustees."

They then reviewed the principal legal arguments of counsel, before commencing an exhaustive review of the relevant authorities (including the decision of the Supreme Court in the earlier litigation between the parties in Akers v Samba Financial Group), as well as considerable academic commentary. They cited with approval the comments of Lord Sumption in Williams v Central Bank of Nigeria [2014] UKSC 10 at paragraph 31:

"The essence of a liability to account on the footing of knowing receipt is that the defendant has accepted trust assets knowing that they were transferred to him in breach of trust and that he had no right to receive them. His possession is therefore at all times wrongful and adverse to the rights of both the true trustees and the beneficiaries. No trust has been reposed in him. He does not have the powers or duties of a trustee, for example with regard to investment or management. His sole obligation of any practical significance is to restore the assets immediately" (emphasis added).

They conclude their review by upholding the decision of the High Court, that:

"While it may be legitimate to refer to knowing receipt as a species of equitable wrongdoing, it is not based exclusively on fault. For liability to arise, the defendant must also have received trust property or, as Hoffmann LJ put it in El Ajou v Dollar Land Holdings plc, "assets which are traceable as representing the assets of the plaintiff"."

They added:

"In all the circumstances, it seems to us that the Judge was right to conclude that a knowing recipient "must have held trust property, not property to which from the moment of receipt he had good title" and that "a claim in knowing receipt, where dishonest assistance is not alleged, will fail if, at the moment of receipt, the beneficiary's equitable proprietary interest is destroyed or overridden so that the recipient holds the property as beneficial owner of it". ...
In short, a continuing proprietary interest in the relevant property is required for a knowing receipt claim to be possible. A defendant cannot be liable for knowing receipt if he took the property free of any interest of the claimant."

=== The 'Saudi Law' issue ===
The court noted that in an English court Saudi Arabian law was treated as a matter of fact to be determined on expert evidence. They noted that Fancourt J had explained the reasons for his conclusions in a careful and detailed section of the Judgment running to 88 paragraphs, and they summarised his findings as follows:

"The Courts of the Kingdom of Saudi Arabia do not apply foreign law. They would seek to give effect to the Six Transactions in accordance with the Saudi Arabian Courts' view of Saudi Arabian law. There is no distinction in Saudi Arabian law between legal and beneficial ownership as such. Therefore the beneficial interest of SICL under English/Cayman law would not have been recognised as such by the Saudi Arabian Courts."

They noted the general rule in relation to appeals against matters of fact, as expressed by Lewison LJ in FAGE UK Ltd v Chobani UK Ltd [2014] EWCA Civ 5 at paragraph 114: "Appellate courts have been repeatedly warned, by recent cases at the highest level, not to interfere with findings of fact by trial judges, unless compelled to do so." They also cited the warning of Lord Reed in Henderson v Foxworth Investments Ltd [2014] UKSC 41 at paragraph 67:

"It follows that, in the absence of some other identifiable error, such as (without attempting an exhaustive account) a material error of law, or the making of a critical finding of fact which has no basis in the evidence, or a demonstrable misunderstanding of relevant evidence, or a demonstrable failure to consider relevant evidence, an appellate court will interfere with the findings of fact made by a trial judge only if it is satisfied that his decision cannot reasonably be explained or justified."

After reviewing the trial judge's findings, they concluded that the appellant's arguments:

"... do not come close to satisfying the criteria for this Court to interfere with a judge's findings of fact on foreign law in a case of this kind. The conclusions of the Judge in this case were reasonably open to him on the evidence he heard, and there is nothing in his clear and detailed reasoning which suggests he was wrong in his conclusions."

=== The 'valuation' issue ===
This was sufficient to dispose of the appeal, but (like the trial judge below) the Court of Appeal considered the valuation issue in case their decision on the previous two points was overturned on appeal.

At first instance Fancourt J had held that a 'block discount' was appropriate to assess the true value of a large number of shares in the same company being sold on the market at the same time. The Court of Appeal disagreed, and overruled him in that respect. If a person has been party to a breach of trust, then it is their obligation to restore the trust property or its value to the beneficiaries. The fact that if the beneficiaries had sold it all at once on the market they would have received a depressed price is not material - they did not want it sold at all. They wanted to retain the full market value in their portfolio and that is the basis upon which the loss to them should be assessed.

"We would not, however, wish to be taken to have endorsed the Judge's conclusions. It seems to us that there is a persuasive argument for saying that, where a trustee has elected to receive the value of an asset rather than its return in specie, the sum which is necessary to restore or re-constitute the trust fund will often at least be best determined by reference to the cost of the asset had it been purchased by the trustee rather than what the asset would have fetched on a sale. That might be said to be the measure most likely to put the trust fund back into the position it would have been in if the misappropriated asset had still been held for the benefit of the beneficiaries and, in the present case, to represent the full monetary equivalent of the trust property. It was accepted that a block discount would not apply to the market value ascertained by reference to the purchase price.
... it can be cogently contended that the Judge was mistaken in thinking the application of a block discount appropriate. Were the Judge's approach correct, the amount which a person in knowing receipt of trust property in the form of shares would be required to pay by way of compensation for breach of ancillary liability would seem to be less the greater the percentage stake that the misappropriated shares represent in comparison with the company's issued share capital."

== Supreme Court ==
The Supreme Court dismissed the appeal unanimously, but gave different reasons for doing so. The majority supported the judgment of Lord Briggs, who analysed a claim in knowing receipt as being ancillary to a proprietary claim. Conversely Lord Burrows categorised a claim in knowing receipt as an "equitable proprietary wrong". However the entire court agreed that a claim in knowing receipt is precluded where the claimant's proprietary equitable interest has been extinguished or overridden by the time that the recipient received the property.

=== Lord Hodge ===
Lord Hodge gave a short judgment affirming that the court was unanimous that the claim in knowing receipt could not succeed, but the court differed in their reasons (which he summarised). The majority (Lord Hodge, Lord Leggatt and Lord Stephens) preferred the reasoning of Lord Briggs to that of Lord Burrows.

=== Lord Briggs ===
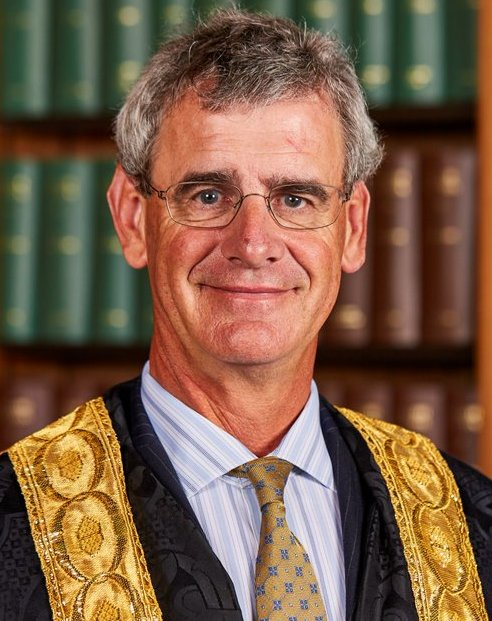
Lord Briggs.

After summarising the background facts, Lord Briggs indicated that he intended to approach the matter in two stages: firstly, as a matter of the basic principles of equity, and then secondly, to review the various authorities (which he noted were not binding upon this court, and were not always clear).

In terms of first principles, Lord Briggs noted that it was a cornerstone of equity from the time of Pilcher v Rawlins (1872) LR 7 Ch App 259 that where a trustee transferred trust property to a bona fide purchaser for value without notice then that purchaser would take absolutely free of beneficiary's equitable interests. If the purchaser later became aware of the breach of trust, that would not revive those interests. Nor would it revive those interests if the property was then transferred to another person who was aware of the breach of trust (however the trust would revive if the property was transferred back to the original trustee). Lord Briggs noted that although Samba, and its successor the Saudi National Bank, were not literally bona fide purchasers for value without notice, they were effectively in the same position as the proper law of the transfers (Saudi law) had extinguished the equitable title of the beneficiaries (as determined in Akers v Samba Financial Group [2017] UKSC 6).

Lord Briggs also considered that a claim in knowing receipt could not subsist once the equitable title in the property had been destroyed (although a claim in knowing assistance could). This would be true whether the equitable title was extinguished by a bona purchaser for value without notice, or by the operation of foreign law or any other basis. He rejected the appellants argument that liability in knowing receipt was dependent upon whether the conscience of the recipient was affected rather than the existence of the proprietary interest. In particular he stressed five points:

1. there was a deep-rooted contradiction between having clean title and being under an obligation to restore the property to someone else;
2. there was a lack of logic in the argument that whilst overreaching may kill off the equitable interest necessary to maintain a proprietary claim, it nonetheless leaves in place a claim in knowing receipt, with the same liability to return the property;
3. the proposition that the overriding of any continuing equitable interest by a foreign law applicable to the property or to the transaction leaves intact the claim in knowing receipt fails to give appropriate respect to the primacy of that foreign law in regulating title to the property in the hands of the recipient;
4. to align knowing receipt liability with dishonest assistance as a form of liability based upon fault arising from a connection with the breach of trust, but a lesser fault than dishonesty, would create a two-tier structure of fault-based ancillary liability with no apparent justification for doing so; and
5. in the absence of any original fiduciary relationship between the claimant and the defendant or fraud, it was not clear why a transferee with a clear title unaffected by any equitable interest should have any liability in equity to the claimant.

He also stressed that equitable title was a fragile thing under English law, and so it was wrong to suggest that there was something improper about recognising the extinguishing of equitable title under a foreign law.

He then considered the existing authorities, starting with Barnes v Addy (1874) LR 9 Ch App 244 and Re Diplock [1948] Ch 465. He noted care was called for as many cases considered knowing receipt liability in the absence of any pre-existing traditional trust or, therefore breach of trust, or other pre-existing equitable interest.

He considered two authorities particularly important, the first of which was Selangor United Rubber Estates Ltd v Cradock (No 3) [1968] 1 WLR 1555, and the second was Re Montagu's Settlement Trusts [1987] Ch 264. But the third, and in his view, most important case was Macmillan Inc v Bishopsgate Investment Trust plc (No 3) [1995] 1 WLR 978. In the first instance decision by Lord Millett, he felt it was possible to "discern a principled basis for his view that an "undestroyed proprietary base" was a necessary element in both a personal and a proprietary claim". He further considered Lightning v Lightning Electrical Contractors Ltd (1998) 23 TLI 35; BCCI v Akindele [2001] Ch 437 and Angove's Pty Ltd v Bailey [2016] UKSC 47.

He concluded his judgment in a single paragraph:

"The personal liability of a recipient of trust property in knowing receipt, who has no pre-existing relationship with the claimant capable of giving rise to an equity between them, does depend upon the claimant having a continuing equitable interest in the property when it reaches the hands of the defendant. If it has been overreached or overridden (including by the foreign law applicable to the transfer to the defendant), then there is no equity which the claimant may assert against the defendant, and the claim in knowing receipt must fail."

=== Lord Burrows ===
Although Lord Burrows agreed with the majority in terms of outcome, he preferred a different legal analysis. He thought the better approach was to categorises a claim in knowing receipt as an "equitable proprietary wrong", and provide that it failed in the absence of a supporting property right. The judgment of Lord Burrows in many ways is reflective of his background as a legal academic - he conducts a long and detailed review of the various cases pointing one way and the other, and reviews the various principles based arguments. The attempt to rationalise the case law on the basis that knowing receipt should be characterised as "equitable proprietary wrong" is reached at paragraphs [157]-[158].

Ultimately he, like Lord Briggs, concludes with a short and direct paragraph:

"I conclude that, where there has been the transfer of an asset to a defendant in breach of trust, there can be no claim for knowing receipt where the claimant, the beneficiary under the trust, has no continuing equitable proprietary interest in the asset received by the defendant."

== Reception ==
The decision in the High Court was commented upon at length in the Law Quarterly Review by Professor Ben McFarlane and Sinead Agnew. The authors note that the decision creates academic tension between the 'proprietary' and 'relational' views of equity; they endorse the comments of Fancourt J that the analysis has important conceptual consequences for purely domestic law. They note that this makes the fundamental distinction between knowing receipt (which requires a 'proprietary base') and dishonest assistance (which does not) critical.

Because the Court of Appeal decision is relatively recent, no significant academic commentary has yet been published. One professional commentator has summarised the decision without substantive comment.

Similarly, there has been no substantial academic commentary yet on the Supreme Court decision, but the initial commentary from practitioners has broadly endorsed the ruling and the reasoning.
