= Henry Parry =

Henry Parry may refer to:

- Henry Parry (bishop of Perth) (1826–1893)
- Henry Parry (bishop of Worcester) (1561–1616), English bishop
- Henry Parry (priest) (c. 1766–1854), Welsh clergyman and antiquarian
- Henry Wynn Parry (1899–1994), British judge
