= Law of the Cayman Islands =

National law

The law of the Cayman Islands is a combination of common law and statute, and is based heavily upon English law.

Law in the Cayman Islands tends to be a combination of the very old and the very new. As a leading offshore financial centre, the Cayman Islands has extremely modern statutes dealing with company law, insolvency, banking law, trust law, insurance, and other related matters. However, in other areas of law, such as family law, the laws of the Cayman Islands are based upon old English statutes which can cause some difficulty in modern times. Other areas of law, such as international law, are essentially regulated externally through the Foreign and Commonwealth Office in London by Order in Council. A large body of the laws of the Cayman Islands consists of the common law, which continually updates itself through judicial precedent in the Territory and in other common law countries.

The Cayman Islands is a dependent territory of the United Kingdom. Although the local legislature and courts are independent from the United Kingdom, the British Government deals with all international relations on behalf of the Territory. The Cayman Islands does not have a separate vote at the United Nations.

The Judicial Committee of the Privy Council in London is the highest court for the Cayman Islands and for all other British Overseas Territories.

== See also ==
- Cayman Islands company law
- Cayman Islands bankruptcy law
- Exempted Limited Partnership Law, 2014
