= Nudd v Taylor =

Australian court case

- Court: Supreme Court of Queensland
- Full case name: Nudd v Taylor
- Decided: 30 August 2000
- Citation: [2000] QSC 344

Court membership
- Judge sitting: Holmes J

Nudd v Taylor, was a court case, decided in the Supreme Court of Queensland on 30 August 2000. The case concerned Australian Private International Law, specifically giving a Queensland authority to the application of the Moçambique rule.

== Facts ==
[1] The plaintiff and defendant in this matter lived in a de facto relationship for a number of years. The plaintiff has sought declarations of constructive trust in respect of a number of properties in Queensland, as well as a sum of money which is said to have been a loan to the defendant. The defendant has brought a counterclaim in which she seeks a declaration that she is entitled to a proportion of the proceeds of sale of property situated in California, as well as an accounting in relation to other monies, and damages.

[2] In response the plaintiff has filed a conditional notice of intention to defend, disputing the court's jurisdiction to entertain the counterclaim. By the present application he sought a declaration under Rule 16 of the Uniform Civil Procedures Rules to the effect that there is no jurisdiction in the court to deal with the causes of action pleaded in the counterclaim. Upon the hearing of the application, however, the plaintiff's counsel, Mr Taylor, confined his submissions to the claim in respect of the proceeds of sale of the Californian properties, and couched the relief sought in terms of striking out of the relevant paragraphs, rather than seeking a declaration.

[3] For the purposes of the present application, the following was common ground. The parties lived together for some seventeen years in the course of the 1980s and 1990s. A number of properties were purchased in Queensland in the name of the defendant. In 1987 they moved to the United States. From 1992 properties were acquired in California. Each of them has been sold. The plaintiff continues to reside in California, while the defendant is resident in New Zealand.

== Judgement ==
Holmes J in determining whether there could be an exception to the Moçambique rule applied in regard to the counterclaim, stated:

[15] In the present case, the defendant's claim to a share of the proceeds of sale of the properties in California depends entirely on her ability to demonstrate a beneficial interest in the properties. The outcome of her counterclaim must depend on how that question is determined. Her claim is, in my view, properly described as one which essentially concerns her right to an interest in the properties as the gravamen of her claim. Accordingly, it becomes necessary to consider whether the second exception applies. Clearly enough, the claim involves the assertion of an equitable obligation of a kind which courts have been prepared to enforce notwithstanding a connection with foreign immovables; but what of the situation when the party against whom the obligation is asserted is not within the jurisdiction?

Holmes J in determining that a foreign litigant had submitted himself to this jurisdiction stated:

[21] It is too broad a statement to say that a foreign plaintiff who proceeds in Queensland thereby submits himself to the court's jurisdiction at large. The position, is, in my respect view, correctly stated by Holland J in National Commercial Bank v Wimborne:

a foreign plaintiff, not otherwise subject to the jurisdiction of the court, who brings an action in the Court submits himself by ecessary [sic] implication to every matter of counter-claim that would operate as a defence to his action or that would as a set off or cross claim arising out of the same subject matter reduce or extinguish the plaintiffs' claim; and also, at least if he is not a foreign Sovereign, to a counterclaim founded on or directly arising out of the same subject matter as the plaintiffs' claim that would require to be tried in order to do justice between the parties in relation to that subject matter even if it might result in a judgment against the plaintiff on the counterclaim.

His Honour continued,

To what has the plaintiff submitted? The answer to that lies, I think, in a consideration of what the plaintiff has brought to the Court for adjudication. He could not, in my opinion, properly be said to have submitted to claims outside of and independent of the subject matter of his own action.

That case was cited with approval by the New South Wales Court of Appeal in Marlborough Harbour Board v Charter Travel Co Ltd. In the latter case, the court was prepared to go somewhat further, deciding that the foreign plaintiff's submission to the jurisdiction extended to a counterclaim which raised a new cause of action, provided that such a cross-claim was founded on or directly arose out of the same subject matter as that of the action.

To similar effect, the English Court of Appeal in Republic of Liberia v Gulf Oceanic Inc concluded that a plaintiff submitted himself to the incidents of his litigation, including liability to a counterclaim properly brought. In that case the plaintiffs had sought a declaration in relation to a contract for the purchase of oil and a resulting arbitration. The defendant's counterclaim for damages for breach of the same contract and tort for wrongful procuring of the breach was permitted to stand, notwithstanding that the foreign defendants could not, in the absence of their own litigation, have been made amenable to the jurisdiction of the court on such an action.

== See also ==
=== Cases Referring to this Case ===
- AFS Freight Management Pty Ltd v Ziegler Nederland BV. ^{(Applied)}

=== Cases Considered by this Case ===
Australia

- Potter v Broken Hill Proprietary Company Ltd. ^{(Cited)}

United Kingdom

- British South Africa Co v Companhia de Moçambique. ^{(Considered)}
