= Edward Asafu-Adjaye =

Ghanaian politician (1903–1976)

- Asafu-Adjaye in August 1963.

Ghana High Commissioner to the United Kingdom
- President: Dr. Kwame Nkrumah

Personal details
- Born: Edward Okyere Asafu-Adjaye; 14 July 1903 Calabar, Nigeria
- Died: 27 February 1976 (aged 72)
- Education: Adisadel College
- Alma mater: University of London
- Occupation: Diplomat

Sir Edward Okyere Asafu-Adjaye (1903–1976) was a Ghanaian political figure, lawyer and diplomat. He was the first Ashanti lawyer and Ghana's first High Commissioner in Britain with accreditation to France concurrently.

== Early life and education ==
He was born on 14 July 1903 at Calabar, Nigeria, where his father was working as popular trader. After exhausting his business activity at Calabar, his father; Opanyin Asafu Adjaye brought him to Kumasi where he started his education at Kumasi Government Boys School. From there he proceeded to Adisadel College, Cape Coast where he obtained his cambridge certificate. He then proceeded to the University of London. There he won the "Profumo Prize" for being the best scholar in law, following his performance in the university's final bar (LLB) examination.

== Career ==
He was called to the bar at the Inner Temple, United Kingdom in 1927, in that same year he returned to the Gold Coast to practice law. He joined Sir Henley Kobina Coussey's chamber to serve his law pupillage, before going into his own private practice. He establish his own Chambers: E.O.Asafu – Adjaye & Co in Accra in 1927. The chambers was headquartered in Kumasi from 1934 to 1951. He served on various private entities; he served as a director of Barclay's Bank (Ghana) Ltd, Mobil Oil (Ghana Ltd), the Consolidated African Selection Trust Ltd., the President of African Liberal Council, member of the Governor's Executive Council of Adisadel College and many other boards and organisations including the University of Ghana.

== Politics ==
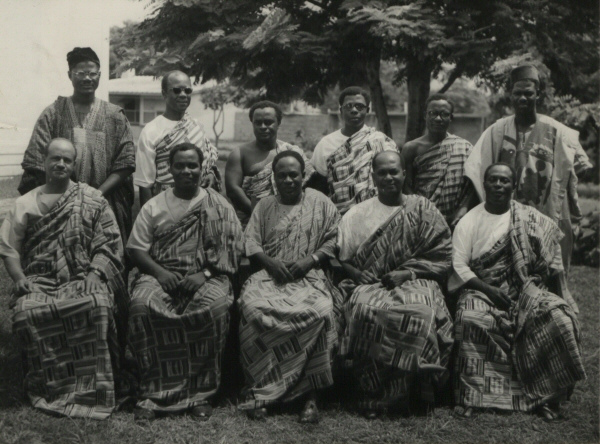
The Gold Coast Cabinet on 6 March 1957: Left to Rght front row: Hon. A. Casely-Hayford, Hon. Kojo Botsio; The Prime Minister, Hon. Kwame Nkrumah; Hon. K.A. Gbedemah, Hon. E. O. Asafu-Adjaye. Left to right back row: Hon. J.H. Allassani, Hon. N.A. Welbeck, Hon. A. Ofori Atta, Hon. Ako Adjei, Hon. J.E. Jantuah, Hon. Imoru Egala

After some time in private practice he entered Gold Coast politics. He first started as a prominent member of the Ashanti Kotoko Society and Ashanti Confederacy Council (now Asanteman Council) in 1934. He was a member of the Gold Coast delegation that met the British Secretary of the State for the colonies to protest against the Water Works Bill and the Sedition Bill. He, together with Dr J.B. Danquah, played a prominent role in achieving the joint Ashanti Colony Collaboration which resulted in the 1946 Burns Constitution. He was appointed as a member of the legislative council in 1946 and in 1951, was nominated as a representative for Asanteman. That same year he also served on the first cabinet of Dr. Kwame Nkrumah's 1951 CPP government. In 1954 he was appointed the Minister of Trade and Labour.

== International appointments and assignments ==
On the international front, he was sent to represent the country during the Coronation of King George VI in 1937 and the present Queen of the United Kingdom; Queen Elizabeth II in 1953. He served on the United Nations Committee on the Peaceful Methods. He also served on the African Liberal Council.

After Ghana's independence in 1957 he was appointed the first High Commissioner to the United Kingdom with concurrent accreditation to France by dr. Kwame Nkrumah. Events that highlighted his tenure in that office include the assault on him that made international headlines of which much scholarly work have been done on; in January 1959, Patrice Lumumba, the prime minister of the Democratic Republic of the Congo, stayed at The Ritz Hotel, London and met with Adjaye and others in the restaurant. The event was picketed by Mosleyites, who in concern with human rights issues in Congo at the time, demonstrated outside of the hotel, displaying banners such as "RAPERS OF CHILDREN - GO HOME" and issuing racial epithets. Adjaye was attacked as he left the hotel, although it has been speculated that he was mistaken for Lumumba. He was knighted by Her Majesty Queen Elizabeth II in acknowledgement of his achievements both locally and on the international front.

In 1962 he was a member of a three-man (which included Sir Henry Wynn Parry and Justice Gopal Das Khosla of India) committee known as the Wynn-Parry Commission of Inquiry set up on 11 May 1962 to investigate the causes of the political disturbances in Guyana which took place on February 16, 1962, popularly known in Guyanese history as "Black Friday".

He was also one of the four member group including Alva Myrdal of Sweden (chairman,) Josip Djerdja of Yugoslavia (who resigned from the Group in March 1964), Ahmed Ould Sidi Baba of Morocco and Sir. Hugh Foot of the UK, appointed by the UN secretary General U Thant to examine the explosive problem of South Africa’s racial policies in accordance with UN Security Council Resolution of 4 December 1963.

== Death ==
He died on 27 February 1976.
