= Lucasfilm Ltd v Ainsworth =

2011 U.K. Supreme Court ruling

Lucasfilm v Ainsworth
- Court: Supreme Court of the United Kingdom
- Full case name: Lucasfilm Limited and others (Appellants) v Ainsworth and another (Respondents)
- Decided: 27 July 2011
- Citations: [2011] UKSC 39, [2012] 1 AC 208

Court membership
- Judges sitting: Lord Phillips; Lord Walker; Lady Hale; Lord Mance; Lord Collins

Lucasfilm Limited v Ainsworth [2011] UKSC 39 was a 2011 court ruling by the Supreme Court of the United Kingdom. The case concerned an intellectual property dispute over the production of Lucasfilm's Stormtrooper costumes by model maker Andrew Ainsworth. Ainsworth argued that the helmets, which he continues to manufacture and sell, were functional props covered only by design right legislation, as opposed to Lucasfilm's assertion that they were sculptures or art which fall under copyright law. Design right protection is retained for 15 or 10 years, whereas copyright protection in this case would last 70 years after the death of the author.

== Case background ==
The Stormtrooper character first appeared in the film Star Wars Episode IV: A New Hope. The character was conceived by George Lucas, designed by artist Ralph McQuarrie, sculpted by Liz Moore and Brian Muir, and finally molded from the existing designs by Andrew Ainsworth. Before the case came to court, Ainsworth had sold replica Stormtrooper outfits online for many years, causing Lucasfilm to sue for copyright infringement. Ainsworth did not defend the 2006 case in the US courts and defaulted. Accordingly, the United States District Court for the Central District of California gave summary judgement in favour of Lucasfilm, awarding USD $20 million in compensation.

In the English courts, Lucasfilm was represented by Michael Bloch QC and Jonathan Sumption QC. Mr. Ainsworth was represented by Alastair Wilson QC and George Hamer.

== Court ruling ==
The Supreme Court ruled that the Stormtrooper helmets could not be considered a sculpture for the purposes of section 4 of the Copyright, Designs and Patents Act 1988. On the issue of the justiciability of a foreign copyright claim, the court ruled that providing that there is in personam jurisdiction over a defendant, an English court does have jurisdiction in this area. On this point, the case was distinguished from British South Africa v Companhia de Mocambique, that expressed the general principle that English courts have no jurisdiction to entertain an action to determine title, where claims applied to foreign intellectual property rights.

As part of their conclusions on the justiciability question, Lord Walker and Lord Collins stated:

We have come to the firm conclusion that, in the case of a claim for infringement of copyright of the present kind, the claim is one over which the English court has jurisdiction, provided that there is a basis for in personam jurisdiction over the defendant, or, to put it differently, the claim is justiciable. It is clear that much of the underpinning of the Moçambique rule and the decision in Potter v Broken Hill Pty Co Ltd has been eroded. All that is left of the Moçambique rule (except to the extent that it is modified by the Brussels I Regulation) is that there is no jurisdiction in proceedings for infringement of rights in foreign land where the proceedings are "principally concerned with a question of the title, or the right to possession, of that property".

They went on further to state:

The basis for what remains of the rule was said by the House of Lords in the Moçambique case to be that controversies should be decided in the country of the situs of the property because the right of granting it was vested in "the ruler of the country" and in the Hesperides case to be the maintenance of comity and the avoidance of conflict with foreign jurisdictions. It is possible to see how the rationale of the Moçambique rule can be applied to patents, at any rate where questions of validity are involved.

== See also ==
- Copyright law in the United Kingdom
- 2011 Judgments of the Supreme Court of the United Kingdom
