= Cayman Islands company law =

National economic law

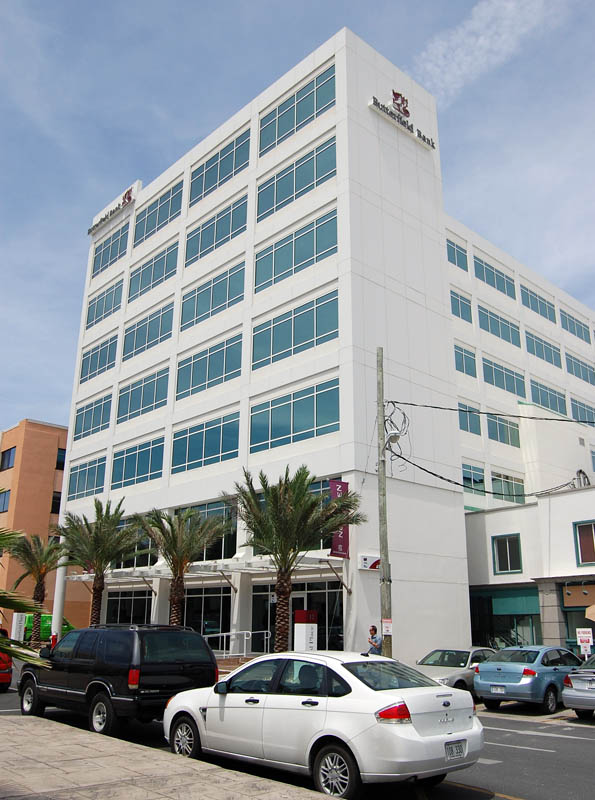
The Cayman Islands is a leading financial services centre.

Cayman Islands company law is primarily codified in the Companies Law (2018 Revision) and the Limited Liability Companies Law, 2016, and to a lesser extent in the Securities and Investment Business Law (2015 Revision). The Cayman Islands is a leading offshore financial centre and financial services form a significant part of the economy of the Cayman Islands. Accordingly, company law forms a much more prominent part of the law of the Cayman Islands than might otherwise be expected.

== Types of company ==
There are broadly two types of company in the Cayman Islands.

The first, and more prevalent, type is companies formed under the Companies Law (2013 Revision). Such companies may be formed as ordinary resident companies, ordinary non-resident companies, exempted companies, exempted limited duration companies (LDC) or special economic zone companies (SEZ).

The second is limited liability companies (or LLCs) formed under the Limited Liability Companies Law, 2016. LLCs are a form of hybrid between companies and partnerships. Although they have separate legal personality (like companies), they do not have share capital and are managed by the majority vote of their members (like partnerships).

== Registering a company ==
In the Cayman Islands, any one or more persons may, by subscribing their names to a company memorandum, incorporate a company for a lawful purpose. In practice, companies are almost invariably formed by professional trust companies rather than members of the public.

Under the Companies Law it is possible to register companies as either a company limited by shares or a company limited by guarantee. A company limited by guarantee may also be incorporated with a share capital. In practice, the vast majority of companies are incorporated as companies limited by shares.

Where a company will carry out its business principally outside of the Cayman Islands, it will normally be registered as an exempt company. This broadly replicates the International Business Company concept from other jurisdictions, except that in relation to exempt companies, there is no tax saving. The main benefit of registering as an exempt company is that exempt companies do not need to file accounts.

Exempted companies can also be registered as limited duration companies, or as special economic zone companies. Limited duration companies are required to include "LDC" or "Limited Duration Company" in their name, and special economic zone companies are required to include "SEZC" or "Special Economic Zone Company" in their name.

In the Cayman Islands, a company may also be registered as a segregated portfolio company. A segregated portfolio company is a company which segregates the assets and liabilities of different classes of shares from each other and from the general assets of the company. All segregated portfolio companies are required to include the designation "SPC" or "Segregated Portfolio Company" within their name.

== Corporate personality ==
In the Cayman Islands a company has separate legal personality from its members (unlike, for example, a partnership registered under the Exempted Partnership Law (2014 Revision)). The liability of the members of a company is limited to their shares or the amount of their guarantee. Similarly, directors or officers of a company are not normally liable for the company's debts except insofar as they may otherwise be liable for their own conduct or actions. The primary circumstances where liability may be imposed upon directors in relation to their acts as directors are (1) where the director is guilty of fraudulent trading or misfeasance, or (2) where the director undertakes personal responsibility or liability for certain actions.

Conversely, the assets of a company are regarded as belonging solely to the company and not the company's members. In exceptional circumstances, the courts are prepared to "pierce the corporate veil" and treat the assets of the company as belonging to the members (or, conversely, treat the company's obligations as the obligations of the members), but this is rarely done.

== Corporate constitution ==
The corporate constitution of a private company registered under the Companies Law consists of the memorandum and articles of association. Companies may adopt the statutory form of Articles (known as "Table A") set out in Schedule 1 to the Companies Law, but in practice very few companies do so.

The memorandum and articles of association of a company are filed with the Companies Registry but are not available for public inspection. The memorandum and articles of association can only be amended by a special resolution, which under Cayman Islands law normally means a two-thirds majority, although this can be increased under the articles of association.

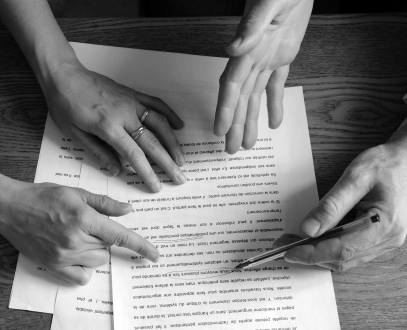
The company's memorandum and articles may be supplemented by a shareholders' agreement.

Any amendment to the memorandum or articles normally becomes effective upon the passing of the special resolution. The company is then required to file the special resolution with the Companies Registry, but failure to do so will not affect the effectiveness of the amendment.

Once adopted, the memorandum and articles bind the company and each member of the company as if they had been executed by the same under seal.

The constitutional document of an LLC is the LLC agreement. This is more closely akin to a partnership agreement than to the memorandum and articles of association of a company. The LLC agreement is not filed or registered with the Companies Registry.

== Corporate governance ==
The business and affairs of a Cayman Islands company are usually managed by its board of directors. The board must consist of one or more persons, and these may be individuals or companies. Directors owe strict duties of good faith to exercise their powers for a proper purpose and in the best interests of the company. The Companies Law is almost entirely silent in relation to the position of the directors, and the relevant legal principles are all derived from the common law.

The members of the company are legally the owners of the company. Although they do not have the power to dictate to the directors how the company should be managed, they have the power to appoint and remove the board, and through this power exercise indirect control. Resolutions may be passed by the members formally or informally pursuant to the Duomatic principle.

There are no special statutory provisions to protect minority shareholders against "unfair prejudice" on the part of majority shareholders. Accordingly, minority shareholders who are prejudiced in this way have to rely upon the common law exceptions to the rule set in Foss v Harbottle, or seek a winding-up of the company on just and equitable grounds. Where a minority shareholder seeks a just and equitable winding-up, the court has a discretion to make a number of alternative orders, such as (a) an order regulating the conduct of the company's affairs in the future; (b) an order requiring the company to refrain from doing or continuing an act complained of by the petitioner or to do an act which the petitioner has complained it has omitted to do; (c) an order authorising civil proceedings to be brought in the name and on behalf of the company by the petitioner on such terms as the Court may direct; or (d) an order providing for the purchase of the shares of any members of the company by other members or by the company itself.

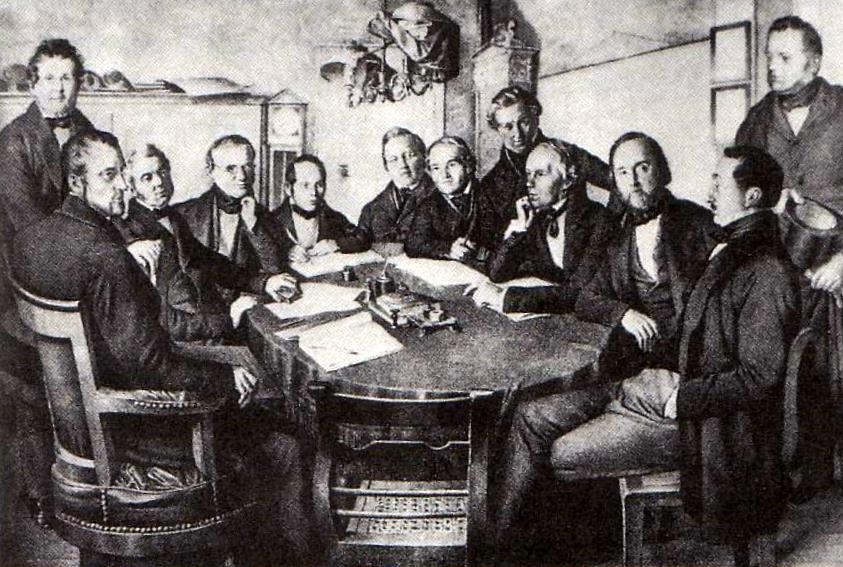
A board of directors may pass resolutions at a meeting (pictured) or by way of unanimous circular written resolutions.

The directors owe their duties to the company itself, and not to the individual members. Accordingly, where a director acts in breach of their duty, the proper claimant in any action is the company itself. If the company is unable to take any action (because it is controlled by the wrongdoer), the court may authorise a member to bring proceedings in the name of the company by way of derivative action. However, the measure of damages will be limited to the loss to the company. A shareholder cannot sue a person for a wrong committed against the company for the "reflective loss" to the value of their shareholding, as this would result in the wrongdoer paying double compensation for the same wrong (once to the company and once to the shareholders).

The emphasis of Cayman Islands company law is to protect the rights of creditors and members (i.e. the sources of capital) as the key stakeholders in the company. The rights of other stakeholders, such as employees, customers and wider society are given comparatively little protection. This reflects the offshore nature of most Cayman Islands companies, and the different social and economic environments in which they operate.

== Shares and shareholders ==
Although Cayman Islands companies can be formed as guarantee companies, in practice almost all companies are registered as companies that issue shares. The issuing of shares is regulated by the company's articles of association.

Shareholders in a Cayman Islands company do not enjoy statutory pre-emption rights or rights of first refusal in relation to new issuances or sales of shares. Although companies may opt into a statutory pre-emption scheme provided for under the legislation, in practice relatively few companies do so. Companies may provide for bespoke provisions relating to such rights in their constitutional documents, and this will sometimes occur in joint ventures or where preferred shareholders invest in the company.

Shareholder voting in the Cayman Islands is predicated on the normal basis of majority control. However, where the majority exercises its power in a way which is unfairly prejudicial to the minority shareholders, the court may give relief to the minority shareholders.

Cayman Islands companies may issue bearer shares, but only to a custodian. There are no equivalent restrictions on the power of companies to issue bearer debt securities or bearer share warrants.

== Debt finance ==
Cayman Islands companies are often capitalised primarily with debt rather than equity, whether by way of intra-group debt or external borrowing. Companies are not required to file financing statements in the Cayman Islands when borrowing money.

Where a creditor takes security from a company for the indebtedness, that security must be entered in the register of mortgages, charges and other encumbrances of the company. All creditors of the company are entitled to inspect the register upon request.

There are no restrictions prohibiting Cayman Islands companies from giving financial assistance for the acquisition of their own shares, and no requirement to go through a "whitewash" procedure.

== Reorganisation and restructuring ==
There are a number of statutory provisions whereby companies registered in the Cayman Islands may reorganise themselves, either pursuant to a general group reorganisation, or as part of a debt restructuring, or in order to complete an M&A transaction.

- Mergers and consolidation. Two or more companies can either merge or consolidate by statute into a single successor company, and the successor company will succeed to the assets of all of the constituent companies and be subject to all of the liabilities and obligations of the constituent companies. In a merger, the successor company is one of the original companies which merged. In a consolidation all of the constituent companies are merged into one new company which did not exist prior to the consolidation. After the merger or consolidation is completed the non-surviving companies are struck-off and cease to exist.
- Continuation. Although not so much a reorganisational process in its own right, companies registered in the Cayman Islands are able to redomicile to (or, in the words of the statute, "continue their existence under the laws of") any other jurisdiction which permits companies to change their jurisdiction of registration. Similarly, companies are entitled to migrate to the Cayman Islands from other jurisdictions where those other jurisdictions permit this.
- Schemes of arrangement. Companies may enter into a scheme of arrangement whereby the court sanctions a compromise or arrangement which is entered into by the members or creditors of a company. The scheme must be approved by a majority in number and 75% in value. Where the scheme members or scheme creditors have different interests, the court may be order that they be divided into two or more classes for the purposes of voting on the scheme. In Cayman a crude form of debtor-in-possession creditor rehabilitation has evolved along similar lines to the practice in Hong Kong whereby the company itself will make an application for the appointment of a provisions liquidator which operates as a stay upon claims against the company, and then the provisional liquidator will promote a scheme of arrangement to reschedule the insolvent company’s debts.

== Insolvency ==
Cayman Islands corporate insolvency law is almost entirely codified across a number of statutes including the Companies Law, the Bankruptcy Act (1997 Revision) and the Companies Winding Up Rules 2008 . In the Cayman Islands, a company will be deemed to be unable to pay its debts if it fails to satisfy a judgment debt or statutory demand letter, or if it is otherwise proved to the satisfaction of the Court that it is unable to pay its debts. Demonstrating to the Court that a company is balance sheet insolvent is normally sufficient. In each of those circumstances, a creditor may petition the court for the appointment of a liquidator. A company may also voluntarily enter liquidation by a special resolution passed by the company's members.

Unless the Court otherwise directs, a liquidation committee comprising representatives of key creditors is established in respect of every company being wound up by the Court. The purpose of the committee is to provide guidance and input on the creditors’ wishes as a body to the liquidator.

Where a liquidator is appointed (either voluntarily or by the court), the liquidator's primary duty is to collect in all of the company's assets and then distribute them pari passu to the company's creditors. The law confers wide powers upon the liquidator to enable the liquidator to do so. Once a liquidator is appointed, unsecured creditors cannot commence legal proceedings against the insolvent company without the leave of the court, and any rights of action against the company are converted into claims in the liquidation process. Any disposition of property by the company after the commencement of winding-up is void unless the court otherwise orders. Winding-up is deemed to commence at the presentation of the petition (i.e. upon the making of an order, it "relates back").

Secured creditors generally do not participate in the liquidation process, and may continue to proceed with any enforcement action directly against their collateral pursuant to a valid security interest. Cayman Islands law only provides for a very small class of preferential creditors, and these are rarely commercially significant in insolvent liquidations.

When a company goes into insolvent liquidation, any mutual debts between the company and a creditor intending to prove in the liquidation will be set-off. The right of set-off is mandatory, and cannot be waived. Nor is the right to set-off lost by virtue of the fact that the creditor had notice of the company’s insolvency at the time of extending credit to it.

The Companies Law has incorporated statutory netting relating to financial contracts into Cayman Islands law, and this will prevail over any other provision of Cayman Islands insolvency law.

A liquidator may challenge transactions entered into in the twilight period prior to insolvency where such transactions constitute either an unfair preference or an undervalue transaction. However, there is no separate avoidance regime for voidable floating charges or for extortionate credit transactions. A liquidator can also pursue former directors (including shadow or de facto directors) and officers of the company for fraudulent trading (but not for mere insolvent trading).

== Financial services regulation ==
Financial services are regulated in the Cayman Islands by the Cayman Islands Monetary Authority (or CIMA), an independent regulator. CIMA’s ambit extends to companies (and any other entities) which are engaged in regulated business. The principal types of business which are regulated are:

1. Investment funds
2. Investment business, including:
  1. dealing in investments
  2. arranging deals in investments
  3. managing investments
  4. providing investment advice
3. Insurance
4. Banking
5. Financing and money services
6. Trust companies
7. Company management

Most regulated business in the Cayman Islands is regulated if it is conducted "in or from within" the jurisdiction. Accordingly, if a Cayman Islands is incorporated to provide investment advice in Indonesia, it would still be regulated in the Cayman Islands because it is providing regulated services "from within" the jurisdiction.

== See also ==
- List of company registers
