= Potter v Broken Hill Pty Co Ltd =

Judgement of the High Court of Australia

- Court: High Court of Australia
- Full case name: Potter v Broken Hill Proprietary Company Limited
- Decided: 20 March 1906
- Citations: [1906] HCA 88, (1906) 3 CLR 479

Case history
- Prior actions: Potter v Broken Hill Pty Co Ltd [1905] VicLawRp 93, [1905] VLR 612

Court membership
- Judges sitting: Griffith CJ, Barton and O'Connor JJ.

Potter v Broken Hill Pty Co Ltd, was a significant Australian court case, decided in the High Court of Australia on 20 March 1906. The case was an influential decision in Australian Private International Law which is generally regarded as based on an extension of the Moçambique rule to actions for infringement of patents.

== Facts ==
Charles Potter was an analytical chemist who lived in Melbourne, Victoria who in 1901 obtained patents in New South Wales and Victoria for a froth flotation process using sulphuric acid to separate silver, lead and zinc ores from waste. The Broken Hill Proprietary Company, now BHP, was incorporated in Victoria and operated a silver, lead and zinc mine Broken Hill. Guillaume Delprat, the General Manager of BHP, claimed to have discovered a similar process, and this was used at BHP's mine. Potter commenced proceedings in the Supreme Court of Victoria. BHP denied the novelty and utility of the patented process, but also that an action for the infringement in New South Wales of a New South Wales patent was not justiciable in Victoria. The question of law whether the claim was justiciable in Victoria was referred to the Full Court. Potter was represented by Higgins KC while BHP was represented by Isaacs KC. A majority of the Supreme Court held that the Victorian Courts had no jurisdiction to deal with the suit as the cause of action was local to New South Wales. Potter appealed to the High Court.

== Judgement ==
In a key statement affirming the application of the Moçambique rule, Griffith CJ stated:

It is settled law that an English Court cannot entertain a suit in which the question of title to foreign land is directly in controversy: British South Africa Co v Companhia de Moçambique. The Courts will no doubt entertain such a question of title if it arises merely incidentally in a case in which the foundation of the jurisdiction is a personal obligation arising from contract or quasi-contractual relationship between the parties.

He further went on to say:

In my opinion the same rule must be applied to foreign patents that is applied to foreign lands. The reasons upon which the rule in the one case are founded are, I think, equally applicable to the other.

'As already mentioned, the decision is generally regarded as based on the Moçambique rule. Although the Moçambique rule is one of the elements in the conclusion of the High Court, an examination of the way in which the case was argued, and of the reasoning of the High Court, shows that it is a decision extending the act of state doctrine to foreign patents.'

== Judicial consideration ==
=== Australia ===
In 2002 a majority of the High Court indicated that it would like to reconsider this authority, with Gleeson CJ, Gaudron, McHugh, Gummow and Hayne JJ stating "We also would reserve for further consideration in an appropriate case the Moçambique rule, and the standing of Potter v Broken Hill Propriety Co Ltd."

The matter arose again in the High Court in 2011 where French CJ, Gummow, Hayne, Crennan, Kiefel and Bell JJ noted that Potter v Broken Hill Propriety Co Ltd

was argued on a basis which, though conceded, can now be seen to be false, namely, 'that, for the purposes of the question ... under consideration, the several States of Australia stand towards each other in the position of foreign States'. No consideration appears to have been given in argument or in the judgments to relevant constitutional questions including, but not limited to, the application of the full faith and credit provisions of s 118 of the Constitution.

As of June 2017 the High Court has not reconsidered the standing of Potter v Broken Hill Propriety Co Ltd.

=== United Kingdom ===
'It received no attention in the English case-law until it was mentioned by Lord Wilberforce in Hesperides Hotels Ltd v Aegean Turkish Holidays Ltd [1979] AC 508, 536 as authority for the proposition that the Moçambique rule applied in Australia. It was only from the 1980s that it came to be regarded as a significant authority in the field of transnational intellectual property litigation: Def Lepp Music v Stuart-Brown [1986] RPC 273; Tyburn Productions Ltd v Conan Doyle [1991] Ch 75 (both copyright cases).'

The 2011 United Kingdom Supreme Court decision of Lucasfilm Limited v Ainsworth, significantly eroded much of the underpinning of this case and of the Moçambique rule, at least within the UK.

== Notes ==
This case was decided at a time when patents were granted by the several States in Australia, and was subject to the common law rule that each Australian State and Territory is treated as a 'distinct and separate country or law area'.

== See also ==
=== Cases referring to this case ===
Australia

- Petrotimor Companhia de Petroleos SARL v Commonwealth ^{(Followed)}
- Regie Nationale des Usines Renault SA v Zhang. ^{(Cited)}
- Nudd v Taylor. ^{(Cited) As authority for the application of the Moçambique rule to foreign immovables being accepted into Australia.}
- Dagi v Broken Hill Proprietary Company Limited (No 2). ^{(Applied)}
- Inglis v Commonwealth Trading Bank. ^{(Applied)}

United Kingdom

- Lucasfilm Limited v Ainsworth, ^{(Distinguished)}
- Hesperides Hotels Ltd v Muftizade. ^{(Cited)}
- Hesperides Hotels Ltd v Aegean Turkish Holidays Ltd.

=== Cases considered by this case ===
- British South Africa Co v Companhia de Moçambique. ^{(Followed)}
