= Recognition of Trusts Act 1987 =

Act of the Parliament of the United Kingdom

Recognition of Trusts Act 1987 (Note: Section 3(1).)
- Act of Parliament
- Parliament of the United Kingdom
- Long title: An Act to enable the United Kingdom to ratify the Convention on the law applicable to trusts and on their recognition which was signed on behalf of the United Kingdom on 10th January 1986.
- Citation: 1987 c. 14
- Territorial extent: United Kingdom (Note: Section 2(1).)

Dates
- Royal assent: 9 April 1987
- Commencement: 1 August 1987 (Note: Section 3(2). The Recognition of Trusts Act 1987 (Commencement) Order 1987 (SI 1987/1177).)

Status: Current legislation

Text of statute as originally enacted

Revised text of statute as amended

Text of the Recognition of Trusts Act 1987 as in force today (including any amendments) within the United Kingdom, from legislation.gov.uk.

The Recognition of Trusts Act 1987 (c. 14) is an act of the Parliament of the United Kingdom that requires and entitles that courts in the United Kingdom recognise the validity of trusts which are created abroad.

The act implemented the Hague Trust Convention, agreed upon internationally in 1985. It has come under scrutiny for the propensity to perpetuate tax avoidance, and the shift of vast sums of money to offshore tax havens.

== Provisions ==
Section 1 of the act gives the provisions of the Convention set out in the schedule the force of law in the United Kingdom. They have effect, so far as applicable, not only for the trusts described in articles 2 and 3 of the Convention but also for any other trusts of property arising under the law of any part of the United Kingdom or by virtue of a judicial decision, and articles 15 and 16 apply to the exclusion of the other provisions of the Convention. In article 17 the reference to a State includes any country or territory, whether or not a party to the Convention, which has its own system of law. Article 22 is not to be construed as affecting the law to be applied to anything done or omitted before the act came into force.

Section 2 of the act extends it to Northern Ireland, and allows Her Majesty by Order in Council to direct that it also forms part of the law of the Isle of Man, any of the Channel Islands or any colony, with modifications and supplementary provisions if appropriate, subject to annulment by either House of Parliament. Section 3 of the act provides the short title, brings the act into force on a date appointed by the Lord Chancellor and the Lord Advocate by order, and provides that it binds the Crown.

Article 6 of the schedule states the settlor of a trust has the right to choose any foreign trust law to govern a trust. Art 18 goes on to say that provisions of the schedule are inapplicable if it would be ‘manifestly incompatible with public policy’.

== Subsequent developments ==
The power in section 2(2) of the act was used to make the Recognition of Trusts Act 1987 (Overseas Territories) Order 1989 (SI 1989/673), which extended the act, with modifications, to the territories specified in schedule 2 to the order, and which came into force on 1 June 1989.

== See also ==
- English trust law
- UK company law
