= Re Montagu's Settlement Trusts =

English trusts law case

- Court: High Court
- Citation: [1987] Ch 264

Keywords
- Breach of trust

Re Montagu's Settlement Trusts [1987] Ch 264 is an English trusts law case, concerning breach of trust and knowing receipt of trust property.

== Facts ==
In December 1923, the future tenth Duke of Manchester assigned his trustees, under clause 14, 'all articles of furniture plate pictures and other chattels' that he would be entitled to after the ninth Duke’s death, and under clause 14(B) the trustees should make an inventory of the chattels, which would be included in the settlement, and hold the residue for the future tenth Duke absolutely. When the ninth Duke died in February 1947 the trustees did not make the inventory, and released them to the tenth Duke. His solicitor knew that this was not following clause 14(B), but said in a letter on 15 November 1948 that he was free to sell the items. The Duke sold some. He died in 1977. The eleventh Duke brought a claim for breach of trust by failing to make any selection or an inventory of the chattels, and release them all to the tenth Duke, who was a constructive trustee when he received them.

== Judgment ==
Sir Robert Megarry VC held that the solicitor’s knowledge of clause 14(B) should not be imputed to the tenth Duke so as to affect his conscience. Even if the tenth Duke had known, he probably would not have remembered when he received the chattels. So although the trustees were in breach of their fiduciary duty in 1948, the Duke had received nothing as a constructive trustee. The touchstone of liability is unconscionability. There is a defence if one knows of a breach but genuinely forgets before receipt. One must have, at least, wilfully and recklessly failed to make inquiries that an honest person would. In his view there are some people who, though not sufficiently innocent to not be bona fide purchasers for value, they may not be sufficiently guilty or knowledgeable to be knowing recipients.

He said the following.

There is no suggestion that anyone concerned in the matter was dishonest. There was a muddle, but however careless it was, it was an honest muddle. Further, I do not think that the Duke was at any relevant time conscious of the fact that he was not entitled to receive the chattels and deal with them as beneficial owner…

... the doctrines of purchaser without notice and constructive trusts are concerned with matters which differ in important respects. The former is concerned with the question whether a person takes property subject to or free from some equity. The latter is concerned with whether or not a person is to have imposed upon him the personal burdens and obligations of trusteeship. I do not see why one of the touchstones for determining the burdens on property should be the same as that for deciding whether to impose a personal obligation on a man. The cold calculus of constructive and imputed notice does not seem to me to be an appropriate instrument for deciding whether a man’s conscience is sufficiently affected for it to be right to bind him by the obligations of a constructive trustee...

[...]

(5) Whether knowledge of the Baden types (iv) and (v) suffices for this purpose [ie circumstances that would indicate facts to honest and reasonable person, or put him on inquiry] is at best doubtful; in my view, it does not, for I cannot see that the carelessness involved will normally amount to a want of probity.

== See also ==
- English trusts law
