= Exempted Limited Partnership Law, 2014 =

Statute of the Cayman Islands

The Exempted Limited Partnership Law, 2014 (Law 5 of 2014) is a statute of the Cayman Islands. It was passed on 2 July 2014.

Section 50 of the Law repeals the Exempted Limited Partnership Law, 2013.

== See also ==
- Law of the Cayman Islands
