= Penn v Lord Baltimore =

Judicial decision of Lord Hardwicke LC

- Court: Chancery
- Full case name: Penn v Lord Baltimore
- Decided: 15 May 1750
- Citations: (1750) 1 Ves Sen 444; 27 ER 1132 [1774] All ER Rep 99; 11 Digest (Repl) 377, 407
- Transcript: CommonLII

Case history
- Prior actions: (1745) Ridg t H 332; 27 ER 847

Court membership
- Judge sitting: Lord Hardwicke LC

Keywords
- conflict of laws; title to foreign land; arbitration

Penn v Lord Baltimore (1750) 1 Ves Sen 444 was a judicial decision of Lord Hardwicke LC in relation to the long-running Penn–Calvert boundary dispute.

The case is important both as a legal precedent under English law (in relation to the extent to which the English courts may act in relation to matters involving title to foreign land), but also as an event in its own right during a formative period of the pre-history of the United States.

The decision helped end the 85-year dispute over the Pennsylvania–Maryland border, although the issue was not definitively resolved until King George III formally approved the newly surveyed Mason–Dixon boundaries in 1768. Ironically, just seven years later the American Revolution occurred, and both parties essentially lost all of the lands they had been arguing over for so long.

== Background ==
The background to the dispute is slightly complicated, and it relates to a number of different charters given to the Penn family and the Calvert family over the years, the parameters and boundaries of which shifted. But in its essence the primary difficulty was that the boundary between the land granted to Penn and the land granted to the Calverts was intended to run across the 40th parallel, and then where it intersected the Twelve-Mile Circle around New Castle, and from there to run south to the land between the Chesapeake and Delaware Bays. However, there were a number of key problems:

- The biggest issue was that the 40th parallel did not intersect with the Twelve-Mile Circle.
- A key subsidiary issue was that Philadelphia was located south of the 40th parallel.

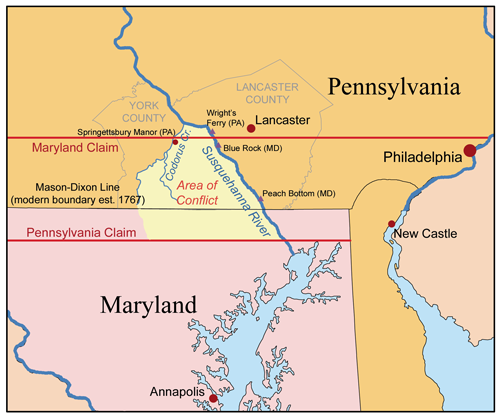
Disputed territories during the period of Cresap's war.

The discovery that the Twelve Mile Circle did not actually intersect with the 40th parallel, and that the parallel was actually north of Philadelphia, Pennsylvania's major city, exacerbated existing disputes over the border. Each side attempted to surreptitiously conduct one-sided surveys of the borders. In 1722, Calvert complained to the Maryland Council that the Chief Justice of Cecil County had been arrested by Pennsylvania for "running out some lines" in the forest; Maryland, in turn, arrested Isaac Taylor, the surveyor who had earlier worked on the circle, for an incursion into Maryland territory.

Conflicts between settlers such as Cresap's War and questions surrounding to which proprietor they owed taxes prompted both sides to desire a settlement. In 1731, Calvert petitioned King George II to force the Penns to agree to a formal demarcation of the boundaries. The matter was referred to the Committee for Trade and Plantations. Calvert insisted the boundary should remain the 40th parallel, while the Penns argued it should be placed 20 miles south of Philadelphia.

=== 1732 Agreement ===
The King and Committee convinced the two sides to come to another compromise. On 10 May 1732, Calvert and the Penns signed an Article of Agreement which reaffirmed much of the 1685 ruling, but adjusted Pennsylvania's southern boundary below the 40th parallel. The agreement stated that the peninsula would be divided by a line running west from Cape Henlopen to the middle of the peninsula, and from that middle point a line would be drawn north to a point tangent to the Twelve Mile Circle. From the tangent point, a line would be drawn along the circle until it was due north of the tangent point, at which point it would go due north again until it was intersected by an east-west line which would be placed 15 miles (24 km) south of Philadelphia.

The map included in the agreement, however, incorrectly labeled Fenwick Island, Delaware as Cape Henlopen. That point was 19 miles (31 km) south of the actual Cape Henlopen.

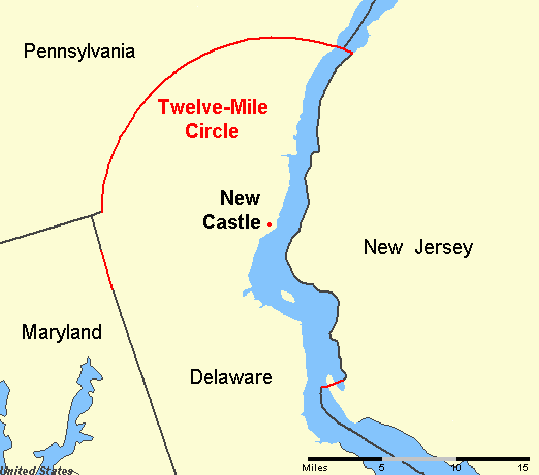
The Twelve-Mile Circle.

The Articles of Agreement also created a new Commission to oversee the implementation of the boundary agreement and the placing of monuments to formally mark the borders. Each party appointed seven members to the Commission, which was to be led by the governors of the two colonies.

The Commission held its first meeting in Chestertown, Maryland. They subsequently met six more times: four times at New Castle's Court House; once in Joppa, Maryland; and once in Philadelphia. The Commission could not agree, however, on several points of contention related to the Twelve Mile Circle. First, the Maryland Commissioners insisted that a circle must have a center point and they were not empowered to determine what the center point was. Second, the Maryland Commissioners insisted the circle should have a circumference of 12 miles (19 km), while the Pennsylvania Commissioners insisted it should have a radius of 12 miles (19 km). Lord Baltimore had also discovered the mapping error that resulted in Fenwick Island being used as the southernmost boundary point in the Articles of Agreement, rather than Cape Henlopen, and he protested this.

Ultimately the Commissioners signed a statement saying they could not come to an accord. Following this failure, Lord Baltimore filed a new petition in the English Court of Chancery, and the Penns filed a counter-petition. King George II issued a decree on 4 May 1738 barring either proprietor from making any land grants in the disputed territory, and creating temporary boundary lines.

=== Case name ===
It has been sensibly suggested that the case should properly be known as Penn v Lord Baltimore (No 2), as it was actually the second case to be adjudicated between the parties on this issue. Penn v Lord Baltimore (No 1) was decided in 1745, and covered much of the same ground. But for whatever reason, the first decision has been largely ignored by both lawyers and historians. In it the court declined to make any final order until the Attorney General was joined as a party, but noted the same concerns as the subsequent decision relating to land overseas.

== Judgment ==
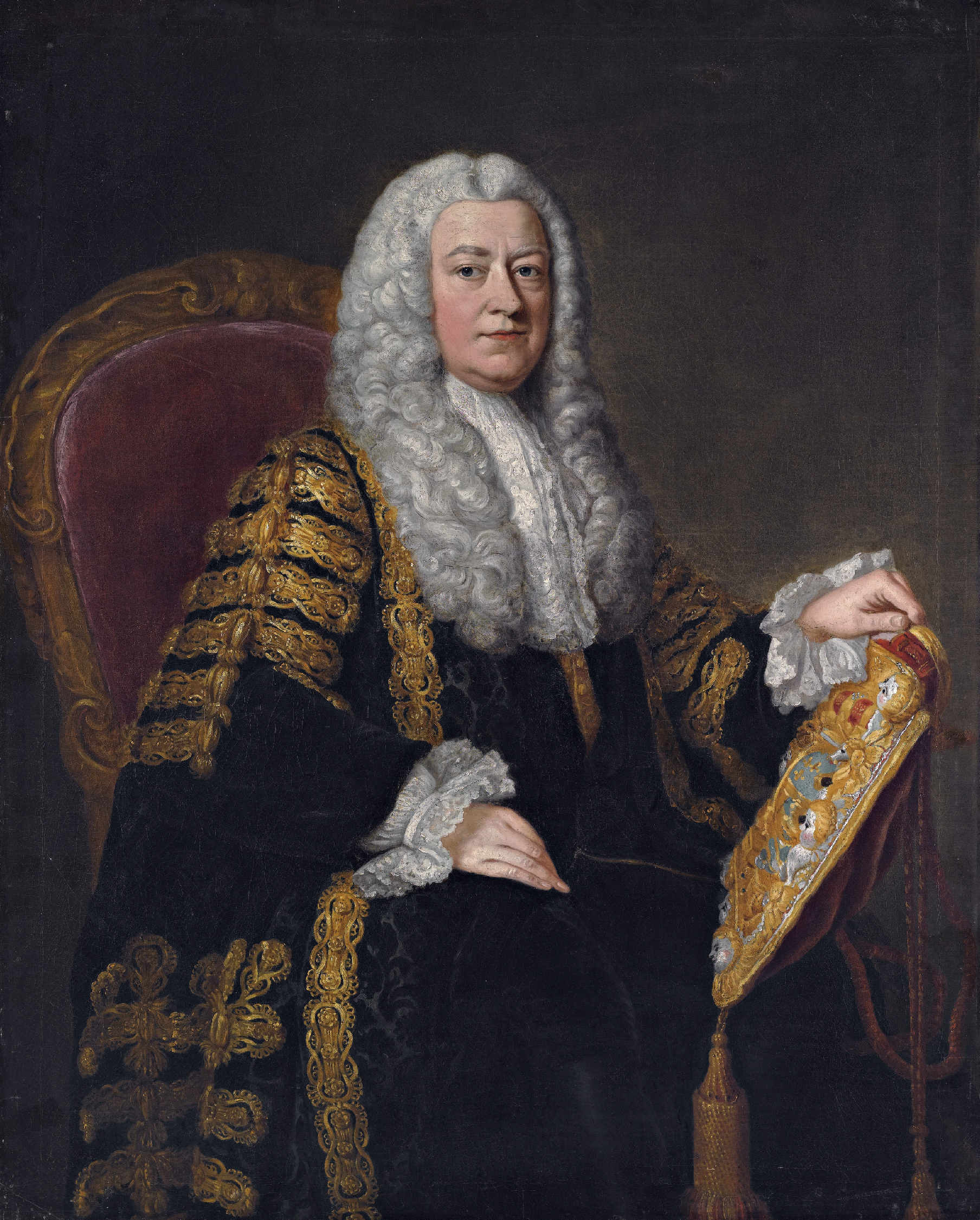
Lord Hardwicke LC

The case came before the Lord Chancellor, Lord Hardwicke, on 15 May 1750. Unusually for cases of the time, report of the decision is relatively long and complete.

He commenced his judgment by noting the importance of the matter, calling as it did for "the determination of the right and boundaries of two great provincial governments and three counties; of a nature worthy the judicature of a Roman senate rather than of a single judge". He also added that this was why the case had been stood over for decision, and not because of "any doubt of what was the justice of the case". He noted that despite the weighty subject matter, the only relief sought was the common chancery remedy of specific performance of the 1732 agreement. He added that it was a requirement of such an order that damages were an insufficient remedy, and he pointed out that was clearly the case here.

He addressed first the pleading that the court had no jurisdiction to adjudicate on matters of Royal grant and dismissed that, noting that equity acts in personam on the litigants rather than binding or adjudicating upon the King. He similarly dismissed objections that such claims are non-justiciable (noting that the claims had dragged on for 70 years and would presumably continue to drag on if not resolved), and dismissed objections that the title of land grants in the disputed areas would be affected and the settlers in those lands were not party to the suit.

He then addressed several pleaded claims against the enforceability of the agreement (that it lacked consideration, that it was fraudulent, that Penn was unaware of his rights when making it, that too much time had elapsed since the agreement to enforce it, etc.). He summarily dismissed those. In relation to the delay point, he noted that time only ran from the default not the agreement, and in any event equity could grant relief in such cases.

In the seminal statement of law for which the case is most famous, Lord Hardwicke held:

The conscience of the party was bound by this agreement and being within the jurisdiction of the court ... which acts in personam, the court may properly decree it ...

Then he addressed the objection that the 1732 agreement was essentially an arbitration agreement (at this time arbitration was a relatively new concept in English law, having been formally recognised in the Arbitration Act 1697). He held that "these articles are not like a submission to arbitration", and "nothing is left to the judgment of [the] commissioners, who are merely ministerial to run the line".

In relation to the suggestion of fraud, he found that the agreement had been proposed by Penn himself, and so dismissed that assertion. As to the claim that the agreement was too uncertain (because of the vagaries of the circle's dimensions), he ruled that it was sufficiently certain, and broadly found in favour of Penn that it was to be 12 miles in radius, but he held that should be measured from the centre of the town, not the outer edges as Penn had argued.

Finally he concluded: "I am of opinion therefore to decree a specific performance of this agreement without prejudice to any right, &c., of the crown."

He then awarded costs of the action to Lord Baltimore, as he had essentially won the action. There was no appeal against the decision.

== Subsequent events ==
In 1751, Charles Calvert died. His son, Frederick Calvert, 6th Baron Baltimore, did not wish to be bound by any agreements his father had made. This froze the resolution of the boundary dispute again, and surveying efforts came to a halt. But by 1760, Calvert relented, and he entered into an agreement on 4 July which matched the 1732 agreement and the Lord Chancellor's Decree of 1750. In November of that year, the Commissioners met in New Castle, agreed to the Transpeninsular Survey results, and placed the Middle Point marker. The southernmost boundary was finally completed.

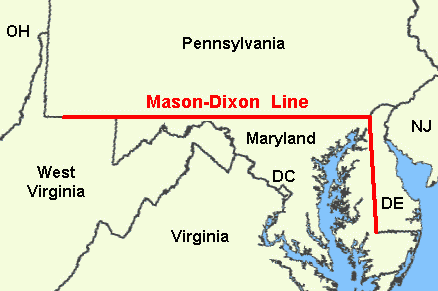
The Mason–Dixon line

In 1761, the colonial surveyors made an attempt at surveying the Twelve mile circle by laying a chain in a line from the Court House's cupola, but they were unsuccessful due their tools and bad calculations. They tried again in 1763, but the line was still off. The two parties agreed to replace the colonial surveyors with a team from England. A contract between the Penns, Lord Baltimore, and Charles Mason and Jeremiah Dixon was signed on 20 July 1763. Mason and Dixon arrived in Philadelphia on 15 November 1763, where they met with the boundary Commissioners.

Mason and Dixon's first task was to determine the southernmost point of Philadelphia, where they built an observatory. They then proceeded 31 miles west where they set up their headquarters for the project on the Harlan Farm in Embreeville and erected a stone as a reference point. The stone is known now as the Star Gazers' Stone. After doing additional observation and surveying work, they established the east-west boundary line between Pennsylvania and Maryland. In August 1764, they ran a line from the New Castle Court House to determine the correct tangent point. From 4–25 September, they surveyed the north-south line down to the Middle Point Marker.

In November, Mason and Dixon met with the Commissioners in Christiana, Delaware and the Commissioners approved their results. From 17 December 1765 through 1 January 1766, they placed monument stones under the supervision of one commissioner from each colony. In 1767, they mapped the western line as far as possible before turning back. The surveyors presented their finalised boundaries to the Commissioners at Christiana in November 1767. They departed America on 11 September 1768.

Baltimore and the Penns petitioned King George III for approval of the Mason-Dixon boundaries on 20 August 1768. King George approved the boundaries on 11 January 1769 — over eighty-five years after the beginning of the dispute, and 136 years after the first grant was made to the first Lord Baltimore. Both proprietary families subsequently lost their colonies in the American Revolution, just seven years later.

== Legal precedent ==
=== England & Wales ===
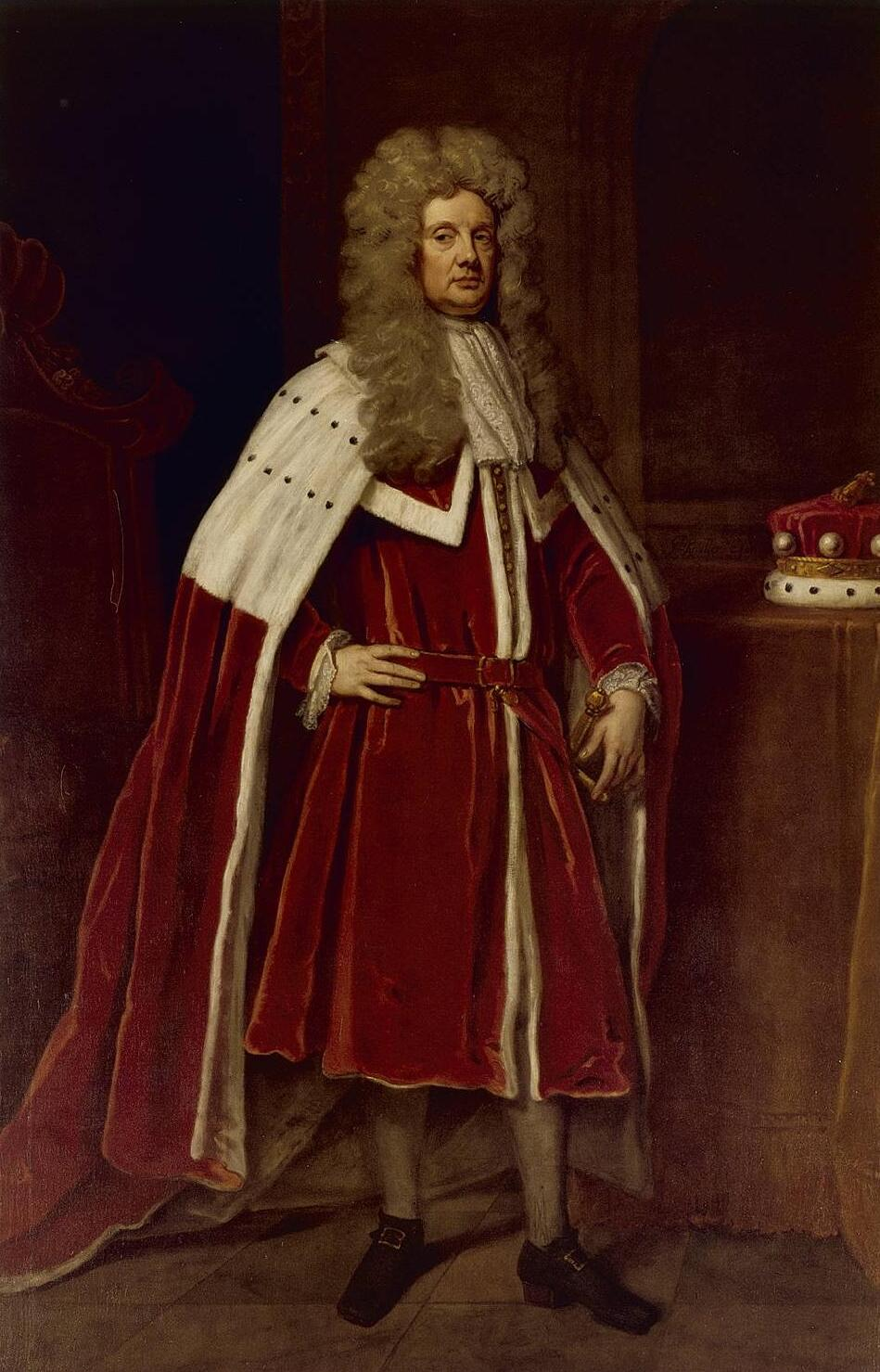
Charles Calvert, 3rd Baron Baltimore

Today Penn v Lord Baltimore is taken as the earliest authority that because equity acts in personam, that the ability of the court to make rulings on individuals in relation to land overseas operates as an equitable exception the Moçambique rule. Ironically the decision giving rise to the exception (Penn v Baltimore) precedes the case establishing the general rule (British South Africa Co v Companhia de Moçambique [1893] AC 602) by nearly 150 years. Indeed, in the Moçambique case, it expressly refers to Penn v Baltimore:

Courts of Equity have from the time of Lord Hardwicke’s decision in Penn v Baltimore exercised jurisdiction in personam in relation to foreign land against persons locally within the jurisdiction of the English court in cases of contract, fraud and trust.

As a precedent Penn v Baltimore is also noteworthy in that it is doesn't specifically state what it is normally cited as authority for: namely that the English courts may rule on matters relating to title to foreign law where their rulings only operate in equity with respect to the parties. Although the Lord Chancellor held that he did have jurisdiction to hear the case, the objection to jurisdiction was stated on the basis that the issue had been determined by the King, not that the land itself was located overseas.

Penn v Baltimore is actually not the earliest case in which that general principle of law is cited. Cheshire & North refers to an even earlier case where broadly the same principle was applied in relation to land in Ireland: Archer v Preston, undated, but cited in Arglasse v Muschamp (1682) 1 Vern 75 at 77, 23 ER 322.

Be that as it may, the case is now universally cited and relied upon for the board proposition that the court can enforce personal rights relating to land abroad by exercising jurisdiction over the parties.

- Dicey Morris & Collins accepts the decision and cites it as the primary authority for the proposition that "though the court has no jurisdiction to determine rights over foreign land, yet where the court has jurisdiction over a person ... the court has jurisdiction to compel him to dispose of, or otherwise deal with, his interest in foreign land so as to give effect to obligations which he has incurred with regard to the land."
- Cheshire, North & Fawcett cites the decision for the proposition "a contract concerning foreign land is subject to a personal obligation which affects his conscience and which can be enforced by the personal process of a court of equity". Cheshire also notes that: "The doctrine of Penn v Baltimore, however, is subject to two limitations. First, it must be possible for the decree issued by the English court to be carried into effect in the country where the land is situated ... [and] Secondly, the personal obligation which is the basis of the English court’s jurisdiction must, ... 'have run from the defendant to the plaintiff', ie there must be privity of obligation between the parties to the action."
- Clarkson & Hill refers to the case as authority for the statement: "the court will enforce an obligation arising from such a contract, or from a trust or some other source, not merely by an award of damages or other monetary relief, but even by ordering a party to transfer or create a right in foreign land. In such a case, the court is not adjudicating on the present title to the land, on which its decision may be ineffective; its order to transfer or create a title can be enforced in personam — by committing the defendant for contempt if he does not comply with the order."
- In Landmark Cases in Equity, the case has an entire chapter dedicated to it.

Professor Adrian Briggs of Oxford University has asserted that the judicial precedent is sufficiently important that there should be a similar eponymous rule referring to the case itself.

However the decision has also been subject to criticism. Cheshire North & Fawcett refers to the comments of Lord Esher MR in the Moçambique case that the decision in Penn v Baltimore, "seems to me to be open to the strong objection, that the Court is doing indirectly what it dare not do directly".

=== United States ===
In the United States the decision is cited for a somewhat different legal proposition. As one of the earliest attempts by the courts to adjudicate boundary disputes between colonies or states in America, Penn v Baltimore has been relied upon as precedent for numerous other cases involving American boundary disputes, particularly Lord Hardwicke's assertion that "long possession and enjoyment... is one of the best evidence of title to lands or districts of lands in America."

=== Canada ===
Penn v Baltimore has also been cited with approval and applied by the Supreme Court of Canada on different occasions.

== Subsequent decisions ==
The case has been cited numerous times with approval in the English courts. Reported decisions include:

- Lord Cranstown v Johnston (1796) 3 Ves 170, 30 ER 952
- Re Courtney (1840) Mont & Ch 239
- Norris v Chambres (1862) 3 De GF and J 583
- Ewing v Orr Ewing (1883) 9 App Cas 34.
- British South Africa Company v Companhia de Moçambique [1893] AC 602
- Re Smith [1916] 2 Ch 206
- Re Anchor Line (Henderson Bros) Ltd [1937] Ch 483
- Richard West & Partners (Inverness) Ltd v Dick [1969] 2 Ch 424
- Razelos v Razelos (No 2) [1970] 1 WLR 392
- Hamlin v Hamlin [1986] Fam 11
- R Griggs Group Ltd v Evans (No 2) [2004] EWHC 1088 (Ch)

In the United States it was cited by the US Supreme Court on several occasions:

- Maryland v. West Virginia, 217 U.S. 1 (1910)
- State of Rhode Island v. Commonwealth of Massachusetts, 37 U.S. 657 (1838)
- Commonwealth of Virginia v. State of Tennessee, 148 U.S. 503 (1893)
- State of Virginia v. State of West Virginia, 78 U.S. 39 (1870)
- State of Missouri v. State of Illinois, 180 U.S. 208 (1900)

New York Attorney General Josiah Ogden Hoffman cited Penn v Baltimore in the case of New York v. Connecticut, 4 U.S. 1 (1799), which was the first case heard by the Supreme Court under its original jurisdiction authority to resolve disputes between states.

In Hans v. Louisiana, 134 US 1 (1890), the Court noted that while some types of lawsuits were not contemplated by the framers of the Constitution, Penn v Baltimore "shows that some of these unusual subjects of litigation were not unknown to the courts even in colonial times."

== See also ==
- Province of Maryland

== Bibliography ==
- Collins, Lawrence (2012). Dicey, Morris & Collins: The Conflict of Laws (15th ed.). Sweet & Maxwell. ISBN 978-0-414-02453-3.
- Hill, Jonathan (2016). Clarkson & Hill's Conflict of Laws (5th ed.). OUP. ISBN 978-0-19-873229-7.
- Torremans, Paul (2017). Cheshire, North & Fawcett: Private International Law (15th ed.). OUP. ISBN 978-0-19-967899-0.
