= Mozambique rule =

Rule in international law

British South Africa Co v Companhia de Moçambique
- Court: House of Lords
- Decided: 8 September 1893
- Citation: [1893] AC 602

Court membership
- Judges sitting: Lords Herschell, Halsbury, Macnaghten and Morris

Keywords
- Mozambique, Private International Law, Conflict of Laws

The Moçambique rule, or (to adopt an anglicised form of spelling) Mozambique rule, is a common law rule in private international law. The rule renders actions relating to title in foreign land, the right to possession of foreign land, and trespass to foreign land non-justiciable in common law jurisdictions. It was established in 1893 by the House of Lords decision in British South Africa Co v. Companhia de Moçambique [1893] AC 602.

Essentially, it is a self-imposed rule to limit jurisdiction in respect of actions relating to:

- title to foreign land
- possession to foreign land
- damages of trespass to foreign land.

In Hesperides Hotels v Muftizade Lord Wilberforce referred to the ruling in Mozambique in the following terms: "Subject to exceptions hereafter mentioned, the court has no jurisdiction to entertain an action for (1) the determination of title to, or the right to the possession of, any immovable situate out of England (foreign land); or (2) the recovery of damages for trespass to such immovable".

Under section 30(1) of the Civil Jurisdiction and Judgments Act 1982 "the jurisdiction of any court in England and Wales or Northern Ireland to entertain proceedings for trespass to, or any other tort affecting, immovable property shall extend to cases in which the property in question is situated outside that part of the United Kingdom unless the proceedings are principally concerned with a question of the title to, or the right to possession of, that property." This rule was subject to much criticism and later became abolished by the above section (section 30(1) of the 1893 Act).

== History of the Rule ==
The decision in British South Africa Co v Companhia de Moçambique was based exclusively on the historical development of the circumstances in which, and reasons for which, a court in England would take jurisdiction to hear any matter.

In the 12th and early 13th centuries, the jury in both civil and criminal matters performed a role that resembles the modern day witness rather than as judges of fact. In particular, there was a requirement that the jury had to be drawn from the particular locality (e.g. village) from which the cause of action had arisen. This was based on the assumption that people from that locality are acquainted with the facts in the case from their personal knowledge. Therefore, it was important for the parties to the action to specify the venue or place at which the event occurred so that the Sheriff can summon the jury from that place. Law of Henry I (1100–1135) for instance, declared that juries from other than the venue stated were not to be permitted in any circumstances.

At the end of the 13th century or the beginning of the 14th century, due to the increasing sophistication of transactions and dispositions, this rule caused considerable inconvenience. This was especially so when the facts alleged occurred partly in one locality and partly in another. To resolve this problem, courts at that time began to differentiate between "local" and "transitory" actions.

Local actions were one in which the facts relied on by the plaintiff had a necessary connection with a particular place (e.g. action for ejectment from land).

Transitory actions (such as breach of contract or trespass to the person) had no such necessary connection.

In the early development of the law relating to transitory actions, the rule was loosened so that the plaintiff may specify the venue in any county he/she desired. However, this led to abuses and in the 15th century, the statutes of Richard II and Henry IV reimposed strict requirements of laying the correct venue. However, the effects of these statutes was diminished by the use of a legal fiction (e.g. allegation that the "foreign place" was situated in the London parish of St. Marylebone). This legal fiction was developed as the courts realised the advantages of taking jurisdiction over mercantile matters which might have arisen outside England.

This development led to a distinction between local and transitory actions. With transitory actions, venue remained only a limitation on the verbal formula by which the plaintiff might frame a cause of action. However, with local actions, the requirement of the plaintiff laying the correct venue remained.

This strict distinction remained despite the fact that by the 16th century, the role of juries was changed. Juries had become triers of fact and the practice of laying sworn testimony of witnesses had become general. The juries, however, still had to be drawn from the county in which the venue was laid. If the matter had arisen outside England (i.e. a foreign locality), the legal fictions employed in transitory actions were not applicable, and so jury could be summoned to try the facts in issue. The matter could not be heard. For example, in Skinner v East India Co 6 St Tr 710, the House of Lords in 1666, held that actions relating to ships and trespass to the person could be determined in courts in England because they were transitory in nature. But actions for dispossession of house and island, was not relievable in courts of England because they are local in nature.

In 1873, the Judicature Act abolished r 28 of the Rules of the Court. This meant that there was no need for a local venue to be laid. However, this change raised some issues. In particular, R H Collins argued that the legislative change might remove the disability of the English courts in relation to local actions, especially where the parties were domiciled in England. In the Court of Appeal in the Mozambique case, a majority (Fry and Lopes LJJ, Lord Esher dissenting) took a similar view of the effect of that Act. Fry LJ considered that the issue of jurisdiction in actions relating to land outside England could be resolved in two parts: Firstly, if the matter were requiring adjudication as to title, the court could not take jurisdiction, since it would have no power to ensure the execution of its order. Secondly, if the issue related to no more than trespass to foreign land, and judgment might be given by way of an award of damages against the defendant, the only bar to the exercise by the English court of jurisdiction was the technical one that the action was a local one for which a local venue was required to be laid. Therefore, Fry LJ concluded that due to the abolition of local venues by the Act, there was nothing to prevent the court from taking jurisdiction.

But this argument was rejected by Lord Hershell LC in the House of Lords. Lord Hershell said: "The grounds upon which the courts have refused to exercise jurisdiction in actions of trespass to land situate abroad were substantial and not technical, and that the rules of procedure under the Judicature Acts have not conferred a jurisdiction which did not exist before".

Even though the courts have many opportunities to overturn the rule, they have refused to do so. Vinelott J in Tyburn Productions v Conan Doyle reasoned that it was too late for the courts to overturn the distinctions between local and transitory actions because it is settled. Vinelott J also reasoned that the grounds to which the courts have hitherto refused to exercise jurisdiction in actions of trespass to land situated abroad was substantial and not technical, and that the distinction was not accordingly affected by the Judicature Acts.

== See also ==
- Potter v Broken Hill Proprietary Company Ltd.
- Lucasfilm Limited v Ainsworth.
- Penn v Lord Baltimore
