= Ben McFarlane =

British legal scholar

Ben McFarlane (born 11 June 1976) is Professor of English Law at the University of Oxford and a Fellow of St John's College, Oxford. He is an authority on Property Law.

== Career ==
Ben McFarlane was educated at Bedford Modern School and University College, Oxford. He was a Fellow of Christ Church, Oxford (1999–2003), St Peter's College, Oxford (2003–2004) and Trinity College, Oxford (2004–12). From 2012 to 2019 he was Professor of Law at University College, London. In 2019 he was appointed to the Statutory Chair of English Law at Oxford attached to St John's College. He is a senior fellow at Melbourne Law School and an academic member of the Chancery Bar Association and the Property Bar Association. He is also a member of the international advisory panel on the American Law Institute's Restatement of the Laws (fourth).

== Selected works ==
The Structure of Property Law (2009) Hayton and Mitchell's Text, Cases and Materials in the Laws of Trusts and Equitable Remedies (14th edn. 2015) Land Law: Text, Cases and Materials (4th edn. 2018) Land Law:Core Texts (2nd. edn. 2020) The Law of Proprietary Estoppel (2nd. edn. 2020)
