= Henry Wynn Parry =

Sir Henry Wynn Parry

Justice of the High Court
- In office 1946–1960
- Preceded by: Sir Lionel Cohen

Personal details
- Children: Kit Wynn Parry
- Occupation: Judge

Sir Henry Wynn Parry (1899–1964) was a British barrister and High Court judge, who sat in the Chancery Division of the High Court from 1946 to 1960.

== Biography ==
The son of the Glasgow surgeon Robert Henry Parry FRCSE and the grandson of Sir William Lorimer, Henry Wynn Parry was educated at Rugby School and New College, Oxford (BA, BCL). During the First World War, he saw service with the Worcestershire Regiment.

He was called to the bar by Lincoln's Inn in 1922, and was a pupil to Lionel Cohen (afterward Lord Cohen).

Sir Henry Wynn Parry served as a judge of the High Court, serving in the Chancery Division from 1946 until 1960. He stepped down on the grounds of ill health and died a few years later.

By convention Sir Henry's double surname was hyphenated for judicial office. So as a judge he was known as Mr Justice Wynn-Parry (or Wynn-Parry J) with a hyphen.

=== Notable judicial decision ===
Notable decisions of Wynn-Parry J included:

- In re Earl Leven, Inland Revenue Comrs v Williams Deacon's Bank Ltd [1954] 1 WLR 1228

== Wynn-Parry Commission ==
Sir Henry was the Chair of a Commission of Inquiry set up on 11 May 1962 to investigate the causes of the political disturbances in Guyana which took place on 16 February 1962, popularly known in Guyanese history as "Black Friday".

== Family ==
Sir Henry was father to the noted rheumatologist, Christopher "Kit" Wynn Parry MBE (1924 - 2015).

== Arms ==
Coat of arms of Henry Wynn Parry

Motto
Vince Fide
