= Cayman Islands bankruptcy law =

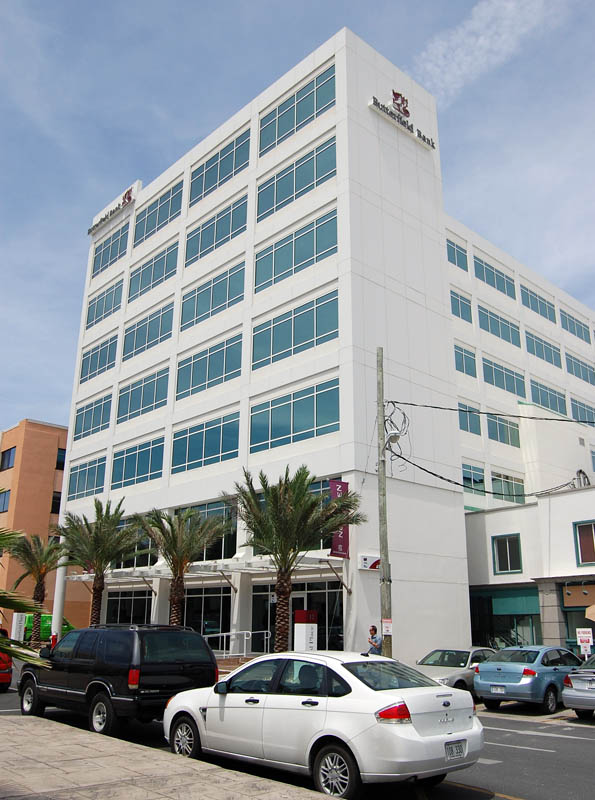
The Cayman Islands is a leading financial services centre.

Cayman Islands bankruptcy law is principally codified in five statutes and statutory instruments:

- the Bankruptcy Law (1997 Revision)
- the Companies Law (2013 Revision)
- the Companies Winding Up Rules 2008 (as amended)
- the Insolvency Practitioners' Regulations 2008 (as amended)
- the Foreign Bankruptcy Proceedings (International Cooperation) Rules 2008

These are supplemented by a number of practice directions of the Cayman Islands courts and a wide body of case law.

Most of the recent emphasis of bankruptcy law reform in the Cayman Islands relates to corporate insolvency rather than personal bankruptcy. As an offshore financial centre, the Cayman Islands has more resident companies than citizens, and accordingly the courts a large amount of time dealing with corporate insolvency and reorganisation. Because a large number of Cayman Islands are listed on stock exchanges in major financial centres, and number of Cayman Islands corporate bankruptcies have generated a high profile internationally.

Bankruptcy of individuals is usually referred to as "personal bankruptcy" in the Cayman Islands, whereas the bankruptcy of corporations is referred to as "corporate insolvency". The relevant statutes deal with both separately, although there are some provisions which are common to both.

== Personal bankruptcy ==
A single creditor or two or more creditors who are owed an amount not less than CI$40 may present a petition to the court against a debtor for a declaration of bankruptcy if the debtor has committed one or more "acts of bankruptcy". An act of bankruptcy means:

1. the debtor has made a general assignment of his property to a trustee or trustees for the benefit of creditors;
2. the debtor has made a fraudulent conveyance of any part of his property;
3. the debtor has attempted to defeat or delay his creditors by leaving the Cayman Islands, or begun to sell his stock-in-trade at an undervalue;
4. the debtor has declared himself unable to meet his engagement;
5. the debtor has presented the bankruptcy petition himself;
6. execution against the debtor on any legal process has been levied by seizure and sale of his goods;
7. the creditor has served on the debtor a bankruptcy notice (loosely akin to a statutory demand) requiring payment of a sum of not less than CI$40 which was not satisfied within seven days;
8. the debtor has not satisfied a judgment debt of not less than CI$40 within seven days;
9. the debtor has not paid an obligation on a negotiable instrument of not less than CI$40 within 14 days;
10. the debtor has made of conveyance which would be void as a fraudulent conveyance if he was adjudged bankrupt;
11. that the debtor has, in the Gazette and in a local newspaper, given notice of his intention to transfer his stock-in-trade, debts or things in action relating to his business to any other person; and that the creditor presenting the petition has served on the debtor a bankruptcy notice in writing requiring him to pay the amount of such debt, and that the debtor has not paid within seven days; or
12. that the debtor has paid money to or given or delivered any satisfaction or security for the debt of a petitioning creditor, or any part thereof, after such creditor has presented a bankruptcy petition against him.

But it is a requirement that:

1. the alleged act of bankruptcy must have occurred within six months before the presentation of the petition;
2. the debt of the petitioning creditor must be a liquidated sum due or growing due at law or in equity, and must not be a secured debt;
3. any person who is, for the time being, entitled to enforce a final judgment shall be deemed a creditor who has obtained a final judgment within the meaning of the Law; and
4. where any debtor is absent from the Cayman Islands, any act done or suffered by any agent or manager of the debtor managing any property, which, if such agent or manager were the owner of the property or business, would have constituted an act of bankruptcy available against such person, shall, in all cases, be deemed to have been expressly authorised by the debtor and shall be available as an act of bankruptcy against the debtor unless the authority of the agent or manager shall be shown to have been exceeded.

== Winding up of companies ==
A company may enter winding up either voluntarily, or pursuant to an order of the court. If a company enters voluntary winding up then the directors are required to make a determination of solvency. Any person (including a former director of the company) may act as liquidator in a solvent voluntary winding up. However, if the directors are not able to make a determination of solvency, or if upon the application of a creditor to the court it is shown that either (a) the company is or is likely to become insolvent; or (b) the supervision of the Court will facilitate a more effective, economic or expeditious liquidation of the company in the interests of the contributories and creditors, then the court may order the winding up be subject to the supervision of the court, and in such cases a licensed insolvency practitioner must be appointed as liquidator.

In addition to voluntary liquidation, a company may be wound up by the court if:

1. the company has passed a special resolution requiring the company to be wound up by the court;
2. the company does not commence its business within a year from its incorporation, or suspends its business for a whole year;
3. the period, if any, fixed for the duration of the company by the articles of association expires, or whenever the event, if any, occurs, upon the occurrence of which it is provided by the articles of association that the company is to be wound up;
4. the company is unable to pay its debts; or
5. the court is of opinion that it is just and equitable that the company should be wound up.

A company is deemed to be unable to pay its debts if:

1. a creditor in a sum exceeding CI$100, has served a statutory demand on the company, and the company has failed to pay the sum within 21 days;
2. execution of other process issued on a judgement is returned unsatisfied in whole or in part; or
3. it is proved to the satisfaction of the court that the company is unable to pay its debts.

Although the reference in the legislation to a company being unable to pay its debts appears to be a clear reference to cash-flow insolvency, case law in the Cayman Islands makes it clear that the court may order the winding up of a company under this heading on the basis of balance sheet insolvency.

Liquidation is a class right, and so the court will not normally make an order upon the application of a creditor if it is opposed by a majority of creditors.

Once a liquidator is appointed, his duty is to collect all of the assets of the company, liquidate them and pay or provide for the claims of the company's creditors pari passu. After the order for winding up is made, or when a provisional liquidator is appointed, no suit, action or other proceedings may be proceeded with or commenced against the company except with the leave of the court; where such an order has been made, any attachment, distress or execution put in force against the estate or effects of the company after the commencement of the winding up is void. This provision does not appear to affect a purely voluntary winding up.

At the conclusion of the winding up the company is dissolved.

=== Liquidation committees ===
In almost all compulsory liquidations, the liquidator is required to establish a liquidation committee. The committee of a company being wound up will be elected at the first meeting of the relevant stakeholders after commencement of the liquidation. The committee is supposed to give guidance to the liquidator in relation to the wishes of the stakeholders in relation to the conduct of the liquidation.

The membership of the committee will be determined by whether the liquidator determines that the company is solvent, insolvent or of doubtful solvency. If the liquidator determines that the company is solvent then the committee must comprise not less than three and not more than five shareholders. If the company is insolvent the committee must comprise not less than three and not more than five creditors. If the company has been certified as of doubtful solvency the committee must comprise not less than three and not more than six members, a majority of whom must be creditors but at least one of which must be a shareholder. In the event that the liquidator's initial certification as to the solvency/insolvency of the company changes during the course of the liquidation, the membership of the committee will similarly change so as to properly represent the stakeholders in the liquidation.

Case law has now made it clear that it no longer has any ability (by way of its inherent jurisdiction or otherwise) to make directions with respect to the composition of a liquidation committee (other than to dispense with a committee altogether in appropriate circumstances).

On an application to dispense with the requirement to establish a liquidation committee, the court will look to the reasons why a liquidation committee cannot be formed in compliance with the Companies Winding Up Rules. Importantly, where a liquidator's determination with respect to the solvency of a company is the sole reason why a compliant committee cannot be formed, it appears that the court may look behind a liquidator's summary determination and examine the methodology used to reach that determination.

== Priority of claims ==
In liquidation the assets of the insolvent company will be distributed according to the following order of priority:

1. property which is subject to valid fixed security interests will be reserved to the secured creditors benefiting from that security;
2. payment of the liquidation expenses;
3. payment of preferred debts;
4. payment of claims secured by a floating charge;
5. payment of the ordinary unsecured creditors;
6. payment of contractually subordinated creditors;
7. payment of creditors whose claims derive through shares in the company by way of dividends or redemption proceeds;
8. payment of post-liquidation interest on any debts; and
9. any balance is returned to the shareholders in accordance with their entitlements under the articles of association.

Preferential claims are set out in schedule 2 to the Companies Law, and broadly encompass employee's claims, sums due to governmental or quasi-governmental bodies in the Cayman Islands, and sums due to depositors by a bank. The Companies Law does not make express provision for the position of a crystallised floating charge, and accordingly it seems arguable that when a floating charge crystallises upon the making of a wind-up order, the position of the floating security holder should change to that of a fixed charge holder.

== Set-off and subordination ==
Where a company goes into winding up, and the company has any claims against a creditor proving in the liquidation, an account is taken of what is due from each party to the other in respect of their mutual dealings, and the sums due from one party shall be set-off against the sums due from the other. Only the balance, if any, of the account taken shall be provable in the liquidation or, as the case may be, payable to the liquidator as part of the assets.

This right of insolvency set-off is subject to (a) the rights of the secured creditors and the preferred creditors, (b) any contractual rights of subordination, and (c) any contractual netting arrangements. Where the company has entered into any netting agreements in relation to financial contracts, the contractual netting provisions shall prevail over the statutory set-off rights. This includes netting agreements which provide for multilateral set-off.

== Secured creditors ==
A creditor who has the benefit of a valid security interest can enforce their security at any time - the granting of an order for winding up of a company does not stay a secured creditor's rights. If the secured creditor has a security interest which is only a floating charge, then although the making of a winding up order does not stay the rights of the floating charge holder, because the claims secured by the floating charge are subordinated to the claims of the preferred creditors, in practice the secured creditor is unlikely to enforce his rights unless it is clear that there are sufficient assets available to the liquidator to pay all of the preferred claims.

== Restructuring ==
Under Cayman Islands law there is no formal debtor-in-possession form of rehabilitation for companies in financial distress. However, under the Companies Law, a company may enter into a scheme of arrangement and reorganise its debts if the scheme is supported by a majority of creditors holdings 75% in value of the company's debt. In the Cayman Islands it is quite common for a scheme of arrangement to be supported by an application by the company for the appointment of a provisional liquidator to give the company breathing space from its creditors in order to seek consent for and implement the scheme. Upon the making of an order for provisional liquidation, no proceedings may be commenced or continued with against the company, although this does not affect the right of secured creditors to enforce their security. Although the appointment of a provisional liquidator is intended to be a remedy to prevent fraudulent dissipation of the company's assets, the use of such orders to support restructuring through schemes of arrangement has now becomes widespread market practice.

== Voidable transactions ==
Under Cayman Islands law, there are two principal avoidance regimes in relation to transactions entered into during the onset of insolvency: (a) voidable preferences, and (b) dispositions at an undervalue.

Every conveyance or transfer of property or money which is made by a company in favour of a creditor at a time when the company is unable to pay its debts with a view to giving such creditor a preference over the other creditors shall be if made within six months immediately preceding the commencement of a liquidation. For these purposes the requirement to show an intention to give a preference is to be viewed in line with accepted common law authorities, such as Re MC Bacon Ltd (No 1). There company must have been insolvent at the time of giving the preference, but the giving of the preference which caused the company to subsequently become insolvent will not trigger the provision. If the preference is a payment in favour of a "related party" (a creditor shall be treated as a "related party" if it has the ability to control the company or exercise significant influence over the company in making financial and operating decisions) then it is deemed to have been made for the purposes of giving a preference.

In addition, every disposition of property made at an undervalue by or on behalf of a company with intent to defraud its creditors shall be voidable at the instance of its official liquidator. The burden of establishing an intent to defraud for the purposes of this section shall be upon the official liquidator. The relevant disposition must have occurred not more than six years prior to the application of the official liquidator. There are no specific provisions protected bona fide transferees for value without notice, but where a transfer to such a party is set aside then the transferee shall have a first and paramount charge over the property, the subject of the disposition, of an amount equal to the entire costs properly incurred by the transferee in the defence of the action or proceedings.

Any disposition of a company's property and any transfer of shares or alteration in the status of the company's members made after the commencement of the winding up is void unless the court otherwise orders, where the winding up is pursuant to a court order.

Under Cayman Islands law there is no general power vested in a liquidator to disclaim onerous or unprofitable contracts.

== Insolvency practitioners ==
Insolvency practitioners are regulated under the Insolvency Practitioners' Regulations, 2008 (as amended). Under the regulations a person shall only be qualified to accept appointment by the court as official liquidator of any company if:

1. he is licensed to act as an insolvency practitioner in a relevant country; or
2. he is qualified as a professional accountant by an approved institute, is in good standing with such institute, has a minimum of five (5) years' relevant experience and is credited with not less than 2,500 chargeable hours of relevant work; or
3. he has previously been appointed by the court as an official liquidator of a company at any time within the five years immediately preceding the regulations coming into force.

For these purposes the relevant countries are (a) England and Wales; (b) Scotland; (c) Northern Ireland; (d) The Republic of Ireland; (e) Australia; (f) New Zealand; and (g) Canada.

Moreover, an otherwise qualified insolvency practitioner shall not be appointed by the court as official liquidator of any company unless (a) he is resident in the Cayman Islands; and (b) he, or the firm of which he is a partner or employee, holds a trade and business licence which authorises him or his firm to carry on business as professional insolvency practitioners.

All licensed insolvency practitioners must be insured up to the minimum amount of professional indemnity cover.

== Cross-border insolvency ==
Cross-border insolvency is largely regulated under the Foreign Bankruptcy Proceedings (International Cooperation) Rules 2008. In practice the Cayman Islands courts seek to cooperate with foreign courts and bankruptcy officials to ensure the efficient administration of insolvent estates.
