= Lord Bingham (disambiguation) =

Lord Bingham was Thomas Bingham, Baron Bingham of Cornhill (1933–2010).

Lord Bingham may also refer to:

- George Bingham, 8th Earl of Lucan (born 1967), known as Lord Bingham until 2016
- John Bingham, 7th Earl of Lucan (born 1934; presumed dead), known as Lord Bingham from 1949 until 1964
- George Bingham, 6th Earl of Lucan (1898–1964), known as Lord Bingham from 1914 to 1949
- George Bingham, 5th Earl of Lucan (1860–1949), known as Lord Bingham from 1888 to 1914
- George Bingham, 4th Earl of Lucan (1830–1914), known as Lord Bingham from 1839 to 1888
- George Bingham, 3rd Earl of Lucan (1800–1888), known as Lord Bingham before 1839
- Richard Bingham, 2nd Earl of Lucan (1764–1839), known as Lord Bingham from 1795 to 1799

== See also ==
- Earl of Lucan
