= Lucan (British TV series) =

2013 British television drama series

- Genre: Thriller
- Based on: The Gamblers by John Pearson
- Written by: Jeff Pope
- Directed by: Adrian Shergold
- Starring: Rory Kinnear; Catherine McCormack; Christopher Eccleston
- Composer: Ben Bartlett
- Country of origin: United Kingdom
- Original language: English
- No. of episodes: 2

Production
- Executive producers: Quentin Curtis; Aaron Hartley; Grace Hartley; Francis Hopkinson; Jeff Pope
- Producer: Chris Clough
- Production companies: ITV Studios and Motion Content Group

Original release
- Network: ITV
- Release: 11 December 2013

Lucan is a two-part British television drama, starring Rory Kinnear, Christopher Eccleston and Catherine McCormack, portraying the disappearance in 1974 of the Earl of Lucan, following the murder of his children's nanny. Written by Jeff Pope and directed by Adrian Shergold, it was broadcast in December 2013 on ITV.

Although the drama describes actual events, it also has a speculative element.

== Plot ==
In 2003, author John Pearson, while researching a book about the former Clermont Club, becomes interested in the 1974 disappearance of John Bingham, 7th Earl of Lucan. He pieces the story together through interviews with some of Lucan's contemporaries.

Twenty-nine years previously, Lord Lucan, a professional gambler, is close friends with John Aspinall, the proprietor of the Clermont. Although initial success at the tables earns him the nickname "Lucky", by 1974 he has fallen into massive debt due to his gambling addiction. As his relationship with his wife Veronica deteriorates into violence, Lucan tells his friends that his wife is mentally unstable in a bid to secure custody of their children. However, Lucan ultimately loses the court case. As a condition of the court judgment, Veronica hires Sandra Rivett as a full-time nanny.

On the evening of 7 November 1974, Lucan surreptitiously enters the family house and waits in the basement kitchen. He mistakenly believes that Veronica is alone with the children, unaware that Rivett has changed her evening off. When Rivett goes to the kitchen to make tea, Lucan, thinking that she is Veronica, bludgeons her to death. Veronica is also attacked by Lucan, but she fights him off. With blood streaming from her face, she runs for help to a nearby pub. The police arrive at the house and find Rivett's body.

At 11.35 pm, Lucan arrives at the Maxwell-Scotts' house in Uckfield, telling Susie Maxwell-Scott his version of the evening's events: that an unknown intruder attacked Veronica; that he (Lucan) fought the intruder off; and that he fled the scene for fear that Veronica would unjustly accuse him of the attack. He leaves the Maxwell-Scotts' house at 1.15 am. This would be the last time that anyone was known to have seen Lord Lucan. The police later find his car abandoned in Newhaven, but Lucan himself is never seen again. Meanwhile, Aspinall persuades members of the Clermont to close ranks around Lucan and to do whatever they can to protect him.

In 2003, in a final interview, Maxwell-Scott tells Pearson what she believes happened to Lucan: after Lucan left Uckfield, Aspinall arranged for him to be taken to France in Aspinall's private boat, and then by car to a remote cottage in Switzerland where he hid for several months. Lucan eventually decided to come home because he wanted to see his children and to clear his name. Aspinall, afraid of what an investigation would reveal about his involvement in the escape, arranged for Lucan to be shot in the English Channel and his body dumped overboard.

Pearson concludes that Maxwell-Scott's theory is one of the more intriguing ones concerning Lucan's fate, but that's all it could ever be: a theory.

== Cast ==
- Rory Kinnear as John, Earl of Lucan
- Catherine McCormack as Veronica, Countess of Lucan
- Christopher Eccleston as John Aspinall
- Paul Freeman as John Pearson
- Rufus Wright as Younger John Burke
- Rupert Evans as Dominick Elwes
- James Bradshaw as Charlie Benson
- Alan Cox as Ian Maxwell-Scott
- Ann Bell as Mary, Lady Osborne
- Anna Walton as Jane Aspinall
- Michael Gambon as Older John Burke
- Alistair Petrie as Jimmy Goldsmith
- Aleksander Mikic as Ulrich
- Jane Lapotaire as Older Susie Maxwell-Scott
- Helen Bradbury as Younger Susie Maxwell-Scott
- Olivia Llewellyn as Kiki
- Ruth McCabe as Nanny Roberts
- Gemma Jones as Kaitlin, Dowager Countess of Lucan
- Andrew Woodall as Bill Shand-Kydd
- Claudia Harrison as Christine Shand-Kydd
- Stuart Organ as Mr Justice Rees
- Miles Richardson as Bryan Coles
- Leanne Best as Sandra Rivett
- Annabel Mullion as Annabel Birley
- Roger Alborough as Whitehouse
- Robert Horwell as Sergeant Donald Baker
- Michael Gould as Detective Chief Superintendent Roy Ranson
- Cavan Clerkin as Detective Chief Inspector David Gerring
- Michael Marcus as James Fox
- Stephen Churchett as Albert Hensby
- John Warnaby as Dr Gavin Thurston
- Julian Firth as Michael Eastham QC
- Tim Bentinck as Ludovic Kennedy
- Lydia Leonard as Melissa
- Benjamin Dilloway as Tremayne Rodd

== Reception ==
=== Critical response ===
Lucan received generally positive reviews in the British press, with the lead actors singled out for praise. Sameer Rahim, writing in the Telegraph, said that "Rory Kinnear played [Lucan] superbly: emotionally repressed, pinched and prone to sudden violence." Sam Wollaston, in The Guardian, praised what he called the "extraordinary performances" of Kinnear, Eccleston and McCormack.

In The Independent, Sarah Hughes wrote: "Rory Kinnear perfectly caught Lucan's ponderous charm, making you see why women such as Susie Maxwell-Scott might have covered up for him simply by dint of his birth, while there were strong performances from Jane Lapotaire as the older Susie, Leanne Best as Rivett and, in particular, Catherine McCormack as poor beleaguered Veronica." But Hughes also criticised the drama as "murder regurgitated as entertainment", saying that "the real story is the brutal death of Sandra Rivett and there was something wrong about the way she was reduced to a bit part in her own tale. Lucan was a brilliantly acted, cleverly scripted and beautifully shot drama. I'm not sure it should have ever been made."

=== Lucan and Rivett family members ===
Both Lord Lucan’s daughter and Sandra Rivett's son strongly criticised the making of the drama. Rivett's son, Neil Berriman, said in an interview that, "the programme is not entertainment. They are profiting from my mum's death. I can understand interest in certain aspects of the case, but I think depicting the murder is appalling."

Lucan's daughter, Camilla Bingham, said that "the collective Lucan family has never endorsed this drama and I don’t believe that the Rivett family has either. I am not aware that the drama will offer any new insights into the tragic events of 7 November 1974 ... If there were new insights, the proper course would be for the relevant evidence to be submitted to the police, not titivated and presented to the public under the guise of entertainment. ... This drama will not inform or educate and no right-thinking person could regard it as entertainment."

In reply, ITV said that "the drama is not a re-hash of the story but rather seeks to provide a new insight into the events of 7 November 1974 and, crucially, attempts to answer the riddle of what became of Lord Lucan."
