= George Bingham =

George Bingham may refer to:

- Sir George Bingham (military governor), military governor of Sligo, 1569; one of two people, either (1) the brother or (2) a cousin of Richard Bingham (1528–1599)
- Sir George Bingham, 2nd Baronet (c. 1625–1682), Irish MP for Castlebar, Custos Rotulorum for Mayo
- George Caleb Bingham (1811–1879), American artist
- George G. Bingham (1855–1924), American judge and legal educator in the state of Oregon
- George W. Bingham (1860–1947), American politician in the state of Wisconsin
- George Hutchins Bingham (1864–1949), judge of the United States Court of Appeals
- George Bingham (antiquary) (1715–1800), divine and antiquary
- Sir George Ridout Bingham (1777–1833), British Army officer in the Napoleonic Wars

== Earls of Lucan ==
- George Bingham, 3rd Earl of Lucan (1800–1888), British field marshal, MP and Lord Lieutenant for Mayo
- George Bingham, 4th Earl of Lucan (1830–1914), British MP for Mayo and Lord Lieutenant of Mayo
- George Bingham, 5th Earl of Lucan (1860–1949), British MP for Chertsey, Government Chief Whip
- George Bingham, 6th Earl of Lucan (1898–1964), British Under-Secretary of State for Commonwealth Relations
- George Bingham, 8th Earl of Lucan (born 1967), British investment banker
