= Veronica Duncan =

Veronica Duncan may refer to:

- Veronica Bingham, The Countess of Lucan, born Veronica Mary Duncan
- Veronica Duncan (Young Sheldon), fictional character
