= Julian Firth =

English actor

- Born: 8 January 1961 (age 64); London, England
- Spouse: Gillian Melling
- Children: 4

Julian Firth (born 8 January 1961) is an English actor, best known for his roles as troubled inmate Davis in the cinematic version of the film Scum and as Brother Jerome in the long-running television series Cadfael.

Firth has enjoyed a consistent acting career in the theatre and has appeared in numerous television productions, including Jeeves and Wooster, The Bill, The Young Indiana Jones Chronicles and Margaret. He also appeared in the video of the 1982 hit single Pass the Dutchie by Musical Youth, in which he appears as a pompous prosecuting barrister. In 1984, he was cast alongside Rob Lowe in Oxford Blues as Lowe's Oriel College roommate and confidant, providing inside information. In 2011 he appeared in the television film The Suspicions of Mr Whicher for ITV. He also appeared in the drama The Queen in 2006, as Blair's aide. In 2017, Firth joined the cast of the HBO series Game of Thrones in Eastwatch, an episode of Season 7 as Archmaester Sandhu.

== Personal life ==
Firth grew up in Bristol, attending Elmlea Primary School, Clifton College, and Bristol Grammar School.

He was married to Gillian Melling. They had two sons, William Melling and Bruno Melling-Firth, and a daughter, Bella Honey Melling. Firth also has an older daughter Imogen Firth-Laliotis. In 2011, Bruno died at the age of 19 in a traffic accident while on a gap year in Thailand.

He is not related to actor Colin Firth.

== Filmography ==
=== Film ===
Year	Title	Role	Notes
1978	Absolution	Other Boy	
1979	Quadrophenia	Mod	Uncredited
1979	Scum	Davis	
1983	Runners	The Radio Station - Researcher	
1983	Forever Young	Young James	
1984	Oxford Blues	Geordie Nevitts	
1984	The Little Drummer Girl	Young man	
1985	Lifeforce	Second boy in park	
1986	Absolute Beginners	The Misery Kid	
1987	Hearts of Fire	Reporter	
1988	Paris by Night	Lawrence	
1989	A Broken Spine	Unknown	Short film
1990	The Fool	Unknown	
1991	Twenty-One	Michael	
1993	Shadowlands	Father John Fisher	
1999	Beautiful People	Edward Thornton	
2000	Bedazzled	John Wilkes Booth	
2003	Sylvia	James Michie	
2004	Agent Cody Banks 2: Destination London	Isambard Jerkalot	
2006	The Queen	Blair's aide	
2008	The Bank Job	Lawyer	
2010	Mr Nice	MIG Duncan	
2013	Diana	Sydney Official	
2014	Cephalopod	The Voice	Short film
2014	Electricity	Consultant neurologist	
2015	Blood and Carpet	Rupert	
2015	Burnt	Langham maitre'd	
2015	Somewhere in Macedonia	Sergeant Grant	Short film
2016	A United Kingdom	Mr Speaker	
2017	A Simple Fracture	Benedict Dooley	Short film
2017	Devon Gothic	Baron Frankenstein	Short film
2021	The Last Duel	King's uncle	
2021	Red	Third Tri	Short film
2022	The Lost King	RR Lawrence	
TBA	Chartered Streets	The Traveller	Short film
TBA	The Yellow Tie	Teacher	In production

=== Television ===
Year	Title	Role	Notes
1983	The Old Men at the Zoo	Allan Langley-Beard	Episode: "Armageddon"
1984	Long Live the Babe	Will	Television film
1984	Morgan's Boy	Greener	Episode: "Episode #1.6"
1984–1988	The Comic Strip Presents...	Leonard/RADA student	2 episodes
1985	Oliver Twist	Noah Claypole	5 episodes
1987	A Perfect Spy	Young Sefton Boyd	Episode: "Episode #1.1"
1988	The Management	Piers	Episode: "The Wedding"
1988	The Ruth Rendell Mysteries	John Oldbury	2 episodes
1989	Shadow of the Noose	Wellesley Orr	3 episodes
1990	The Bill	Kemp	Episode: "Officers and Gentlemen"
1990	Poirot	Bank Teller	Episode: "The Lost Mine"
1990	Spymaker: The Secret Life of Ian Fleming	Quincy	Television film
1990	Tygo Road	Solicitor	Episode: "Episode #1.5"
1991	Prime Suspect	Mr Shrapnel	Episode: "Price to Pay: Part 2"
1991	Stay Lucky	Teddy	Episode: "Poetic Justice"
1991	Screen Two	Bates/Charlie	2 episodes
1991	Clarissa	Solmes	2 episodes
1992–1993	The Young Indiana Jones Chronicles	Richard Meinertzhagen/Lambert	3 episodes
1992	Jeeves and Wooster	Bicky	Episode: "Bertie Ensures Bicky Can Continue to Live in Manhattan (or, The Full House)"
1993	Foreign Affairs	Burberry's Assistant	Television film
1994–1998	Cadfael	Brother Jerome	13 episodes
1997	The History of Tom Jones, a Foundling	Northerton	Episode: "Episode #1.2"
1999	The Adventures of Young Indiana Jones	Lambert	Episode: "Trenches of Hell"
2000	The Sight	Tourist in New York	Television film
2003	Cambridge Spies	Prince of Wales	Episode: "Episode #1.2"
2003	Byron	Thomas Moore	Television film
2004	The Alan Clark Diaries	Peter Root	Episode: "The March of the Grey Men"
2004	Gunpowder, Treason and Plot	Peers the Parliamentarian	Television film
2004	Amnesia	Dr Carey	Episode: "Episode #1.1"
2004	Rosemary and Thyme	Quentin Marshall	Episode: "The Invisible Worm"
2005	Empire	Publius Claudius	3 episodes
2005	Ian Fleming: Bondmaker	Man mocking Bond	Television film
2005	Riot at the Rite	Enthusiast	Television film
2006	Murder City	Colin Grantham	Episode: "Just Seventeen"
2008	John Adams	Duke of Dorset	Episode: "Reunion"
2008	Doctors	Oliver Jameson	Episode: "Maximum Load"
2009	Margaret	Norman Lamont	Television film
2011	Hustle	Jeremy Garrett	Episode: "Silent Witness"
2011	The Suspicions of Mr Whicher	MP	Television film
2012	Holby City	Clyde Bagley	Episode: "Coercion"
2012	Secret State	Piers Jupp	Episode: "Episode #1.2"
2012	Restless	Club Servant	Television film
2013	Ripper Street	Mr Wheen	Episode: "The Weight of One Man's Heart"
2013	Lucan	Michael Eastham QC	TV mini series
2014	The Honourable Woman	Ernest Blakefield	2 episodes
2015	Jonathan Strange & Mr Norrell	Auctioneer	Episode: "Chapter Two: How Is Lady Pole?"
2017	Snatch	Lord Cavendish Scott	3 episodes
2017	Game of Thrones	Citadel Maester	Episode: "Eastwatch"
2018	Patrick Melrose	Tony Fowles	Episode: "Some Hope"
2018	Bodyguard	Rob's solicitor	2 episodes
2019	Victoria	Lord Powis	Episode: "Foreign Bodies"
2021	Call the Midwife	Dr Carlson	Episode: "Episode #10.2"
2022	Sister Boniface Mysteries	Dickie Whitfield	Episode: "My Brother's Keeper"
2023	Rain Dogs	Old actor	Episode: "Emotional Erection"
