= Lower Belgrave Street =

Street in London

Coordinates: 51°29′47.82″N 0°8′52.89″W

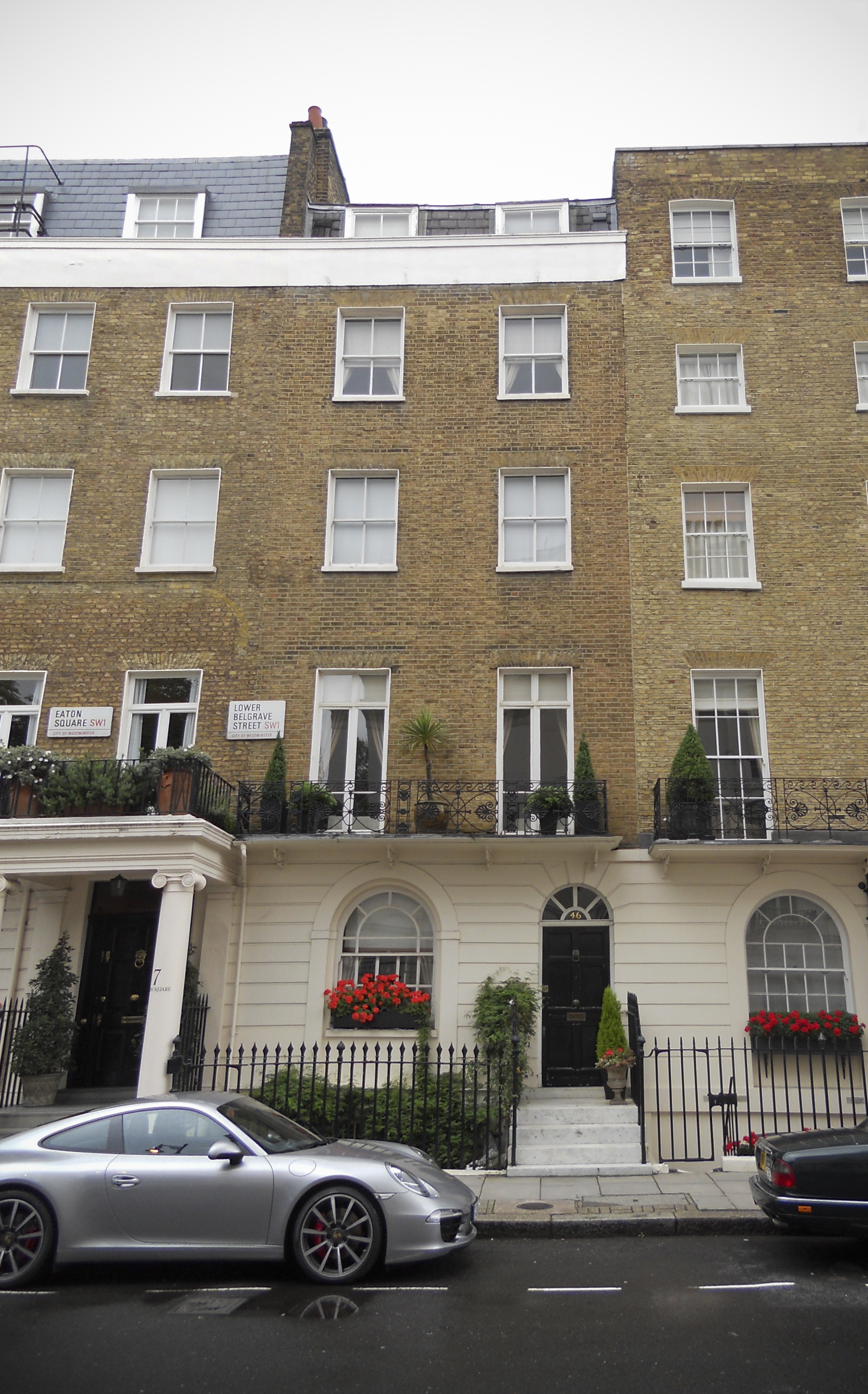
46 Lower Belgrave Street, last family home of Lord Lucan

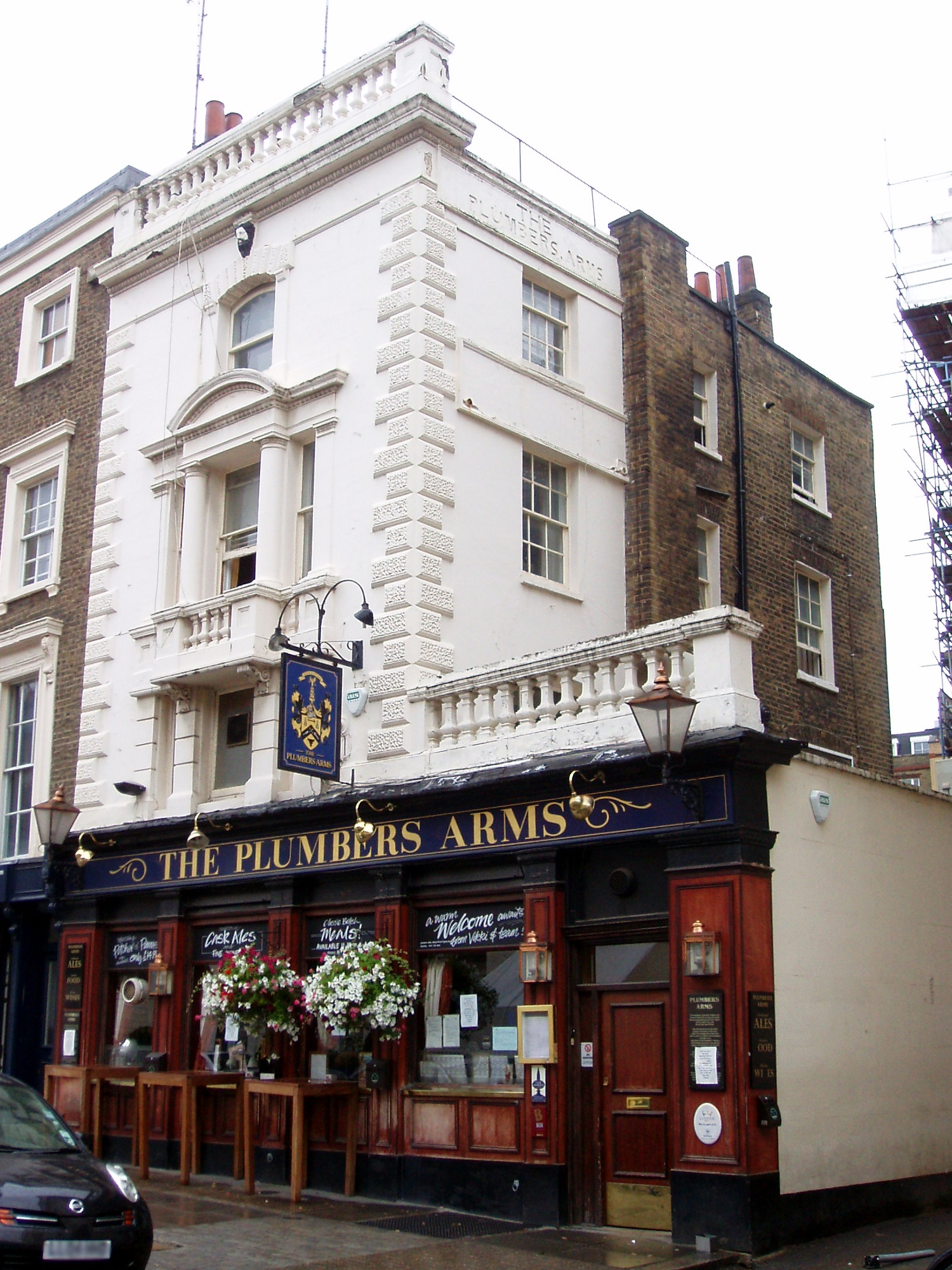
The Plumbers Arms

Lower Belgrave Street is a street in London's Belgravia district.

It runs north-west to south-east and begins as a continuation of Upper Belgrave Street where it meets Eaton Square. It crosses one through-street, Ebury Street, and ends in a t-junction facing Victoria station's west front at Buckingham Palace Road.

Among the notable buildings are a mid-19th-century (initial category, Grade II-listed) Plumbers Arms at number 14. Another is a small primary school.

== Notable residents ==
- Sir Francis Taylor Piggott (1852–1925), jurist and author, was born at number 31.
- Inez Holden (1903–1974), writer and Bohemian social figure and journalist, lived until her death at number 47A.
- John Bingham, 7th Earl of Lucan and his estranged family lived at number 46. He had his permanent home at Elizabeth Street instead when he on 7 November 1974, according to his wife he returned, causing her wounds and to flee to the local pub and gave police evidence he must have been the culprit of the bludgeoning to death of their children's nanny in her basement. He was presumed dead in 1999 for probate purposes and in 2016 absolutely after his immediate disappearance.
- Hope Portocarrero, the wife of Nicaraguan dictator Anastasio Somoza Debayle, lived at number 35.
