= George Bingham, 6th Earl of Lucan =

British peer, soldier and politician (1898–1964)

Captain The Right Honourable The Earl of Lucan MC
- Born: 24 November 1898; London, England
- Died: 21 January 1964 (aged 65); London, England
- Spouse: Kaitlin Elizabeth Anne Dawson (m. 1929)
- Children: Lady Jane Bingham; Richard John Bingham, 7th Earl of Lucan; Lady Sarah Bingham; Hon. Hugh Bingham
- Relatives: George Bingham, 5th Earl of Lucan (father)
- Military career
- Allegiance: Second Lieutenant during World War I.
- Branch: Coldstream Guards
- Rank: Deputy Director for Ground Defence
- Service number: 10428
- Unit: Air Ministry
- Commands: 1st Battalion of the regiment from 1940 to 1942 during the Second World War
- Other work: House of Lords: Captain of the Yeomen of the Guard under Clement Attlee (Deputy Chief Whip in the House of Lords), 1950–1951; Under-Secretary of State for Commonwealth Relations, 1951; Chief Opposition Whip, 1954–1964

George Charles Patrick Bingham, 6th Earl of Lucan MC (24 November 1898 – 21 January 1964), known as Lord Bingham from 1914 to 1949, was an Irish peer, British soldier and Labour politician. He was a maternal first cousin of Cynthia Spencer, Countess Spencer, paternal grandmother of Diana, Princess of Wales.

== Early life ==
Pat Lucan was the eldest son of the 5th Earl of Lucan and his wife, Violet Sylvia Blanche, daughter of J. Spender Clay. He was educated at Eton College and at the Royal Military College Sandhurst.

== Military career ==
He entered Sandhurst, from where he was commissioned as a second lieutenant into the Coldstream Guards, during World War I. Remaining in the army, he attended the Staff College, Camberley. He was a colonel and commanded the 1st Battalion of the regiment from 1940 to 1942 during the Second World War. From 1942 to 1945 he was Deputy Director for Ground Defence in the Air Ministry.

== House of Lords ==
He succeeded his father in the earldom in 1949 and took his seat on the Labour benches in the House of Lords. Lord Lucan served under Clement Attlee as Captain of the Yeomen of the Guard (Deputy Chief Whip in the House of Lords) from 1950 to 1951 and as Under-Secretary of State for Commonwealth Relations in 1951. Between 1954 and 1964 he was Chief Opposition Whip in the House of Lords.

== Marriage and children ==
Lord Lucan was married on 23 December 1929 to Kaitlin Elizabeth Anne Dawson, daughter of Captain Hon. Edward Stanley Dawson, second son of Richard Dawson, 1st Earl of Dartrey. They had two sons and two daughters:

- Lady Jane Bingham (born 13 October 1932) m. 1960 James Driscol Griffin and had one daughter, three sons.
- Richard John Bingham, 7th Earl of Lucan (born 18 December 1934, disappeared November 1974), and had three children, Frances, George, and Camilla.
- Lady Sarah Bingham (born 5 September 1936) m. 1958 Rev. William Gibbs and had three daughters, one son.
- Hon. Hugh Bingham (24 April 1939 – July 2018, South Africa)

Lucan died on 21 January 1964, aged 65 resident at 11 Hanover House, Regents Park, London. His free assets were sworn by the Dowager Lady Lucan, who died in 1985, as £53,479. His stake in family settled land was sworn by Coutts to be a further £41,000. These sums were equivalent to £1,673,000 in 2025. His widow retained few assets on her death and her estate was sworn for probate in 1986 as £115,376 (equivalent to £345,000 in 2025), when she lived at her son-in-law's vicarage. He was succeeded in the earldom and a managed share in the settled estates by his eldest son, who made great gambling losses, was legally presumed to have murdered his children's nanny and suddenly disappeared from the scene in 1974.

== Notes ==
Political offices
Preceded by The Lord Lucas of Chilworth	Captain of the Yeomen of the Guard; 1950–1951	Succeeded by The Lord Archibald
Preceded by The Lord Ogmore	Under-Secretary of State for Commonwealth Relations; 1951	Succeeded by John Foster
Peerage of Ireland
Preceded by George Charles Bingham	Earl of Lucan; 1949–1964	Succeeded by Richard John Bingham
