= Shepperton Design Studios =

Toy manufacturer

Shepperton Design Studios is an England-based manufacturer of Star Wars replica props and memorabilia that was sued by Lucasfilm for copyright infringement.

This manufacturer made authentic Star Wars replica props and memorabilia, based in England. The company was founded by Andrew Ainsworth, who was asked in January 1976 to manufacture first the helmets, then the body armour for the Imperial stormtroopers (based on pre-existing sculpts from Liz Moore and Brian Muir) in the classic Star Wars films.

== Copyright dispute with Lucasfilm ==
In 2004, Shepperton Design Studios claimed to have discovered in their possession one of the moulds used to create the original helmets, and began production of new replicas from them. In 2006, Lucasfilm sued Shepperton Design Studios for infringing copyright and making false claims regarding the original status of the moulds they used. Ainsworth did not defend the case in the US, and the United States District Court for the Central District of California gave summary judgement in favour of Lucasfilm, awarding a US$20 million compensation.

To ensure the decision was enforced in England, Lucasfilm also took the case to the High Court of Justice. Ainsworth's legal team argued that the stormtrooper helmet was a piece of industrial design rather than a work of art, and as such was not under Lucasfilm's copyright. In addition, they claimed that Ainsworth was not under a formal contract with Lucasfilm when assigned to produce the helmets, and that copyright in the design was vested in him, stating that SDS would counterclaim for a percentage of merchandising profits.

The legal proceedings in the English High Court began on 8 April 2008 and continued for three weeks, with Lucasfilm represented by Michael Bloch QC. Mr Justice Mann subsequently handed down a lengthy written judgement on 31 July 2008, in which he found that while Ainsworth had infringed the US copyright, he rejected both Lucasfilm's claim for copyright infringement under English law, and its claim to enforce the judgement it had obtained in California. He also rejected Ainsworth's claim to own the copyright as "neither accurate nor reliable", and that Ainsworth was not the original creator of the helmets. However, he did find that Lucasfilm could enforce a claim in the English courts for copyright infringement under US law. Argument as to Mr Ainsworth's liability under US copyright law was deferred to a subsequent hearing, pending also applications by both parties to appeal.

In July 2011, the British Supreme Court ruled that the Stormtrooper helmet was an industrial prop, and not a copyrighted sculpture. This shortened the design protection in the UK to 15 years from the date of first being marketed. However, they issued an associated ruling in which they agreed Lucasfilm's copyright had been infringed in the US, and those infringements were enforceable in Britain.
