= Michael Bloch (barrister) =

British barrister

Michael Gordon Bloch KC (born 18 October 1951) is a British barrister who is a member of Blackstone Chambers.

== Life ==
Born at Hampstead, a son of the marriage of John Bloch and Thelma E. Platzky, Bloch was educated at Bedales School, Corpus Christi College, Cambridge, where he graduated BA and MA, and the University of East Anglia, where he gained the degree of M.Phil. He was called to the bar from Lincoln's Inn in 1979.

In 1975, Bloch married firstly Caroline S. Williams, in Wandsworth. They had two daughters, Susannah and Claudia Bloch.

Bloch first joined the One Essex Court Chambers, and was appointed a Queen's Counsel in 1998. The same year, he married secondly Lady Camilla Bingham, a fellow barrister and one of the daughters of Lord Lucan.

In September 2000, Bloch moved from One Essex Court to Wilberforce Chambers. In 2013 he resigned from there to join Blackstone Chambers, which was reported as a significant boost for Blackstone, filling a gap in commercial and arbitration law left by the departure of Thomas Beazley QC.

== Notable cases ==
In March 2004, Bloch appeared in the Court of Appeal representing the Bankers Trust in the case of Department of Economic Policy and Development of the City of Moscow v Bankers Trust Company and International Industrial Bank, before Sir Andrew Morritt, Mance LJ and Carnwath LJ. The case was to decide whether a judgment dismissing an application to challenge an arbitration award should be published. The Court found that in general the public interest required judgments to be published, but in this instance it decided that the judgment at issue should not be.

In 2008, Bloch acted for Lucasfilm in its dispute with the British engineer Andrew Ainsworth of Shepperton Design Studios over the rights to the stormtrooper helmets as used in Star Wars. In 2011 this case arrived in the Supreme Court as Lucasfilm Ltd v Ainsworth, in which Bloch and Jonathan Sumption QC represented Lucasfilm. The Court decided that the Star Wars Stormtrooper helmet was not a sculpture for the purposes of the Copyright, Designs and Patents Act 1988.

In 2013, Bloch was leading counsel for Nestlé in its battle with Cadburys over the purple colour of its "Dairy Milk" bar wrappers.

In 2014 he appeared in the High Court for Lush Cosmetics, who successfully challenged Amazon's use of the word "LUSH", their registered trade mark, as a Google Adword and for directing Amazon web customers searching for "Lush" to similar products made by competitors. John Baldwin QC, sitting as a deputy judge, held that Amazon had thereby infringed the trade mark under Directive 2008/95/EC, and that the two Amazon defendants, one incorporated in the United Kingdom and the other in Luxembourg, were jointly liable, as they had "joined together and agreed to work together in the furtherance of a common plan".

In 2016, Bloch represented Simon Le Bon, Duran Duran, and other defendants in the High Court case of Gloucester Place Music Ltd v Simon Le Bon & Others, which resulted in a judgement by Mr Justice Arnold likely to have significant implications in the recorded music industry.
