= Elizabeth Street, London =

London street

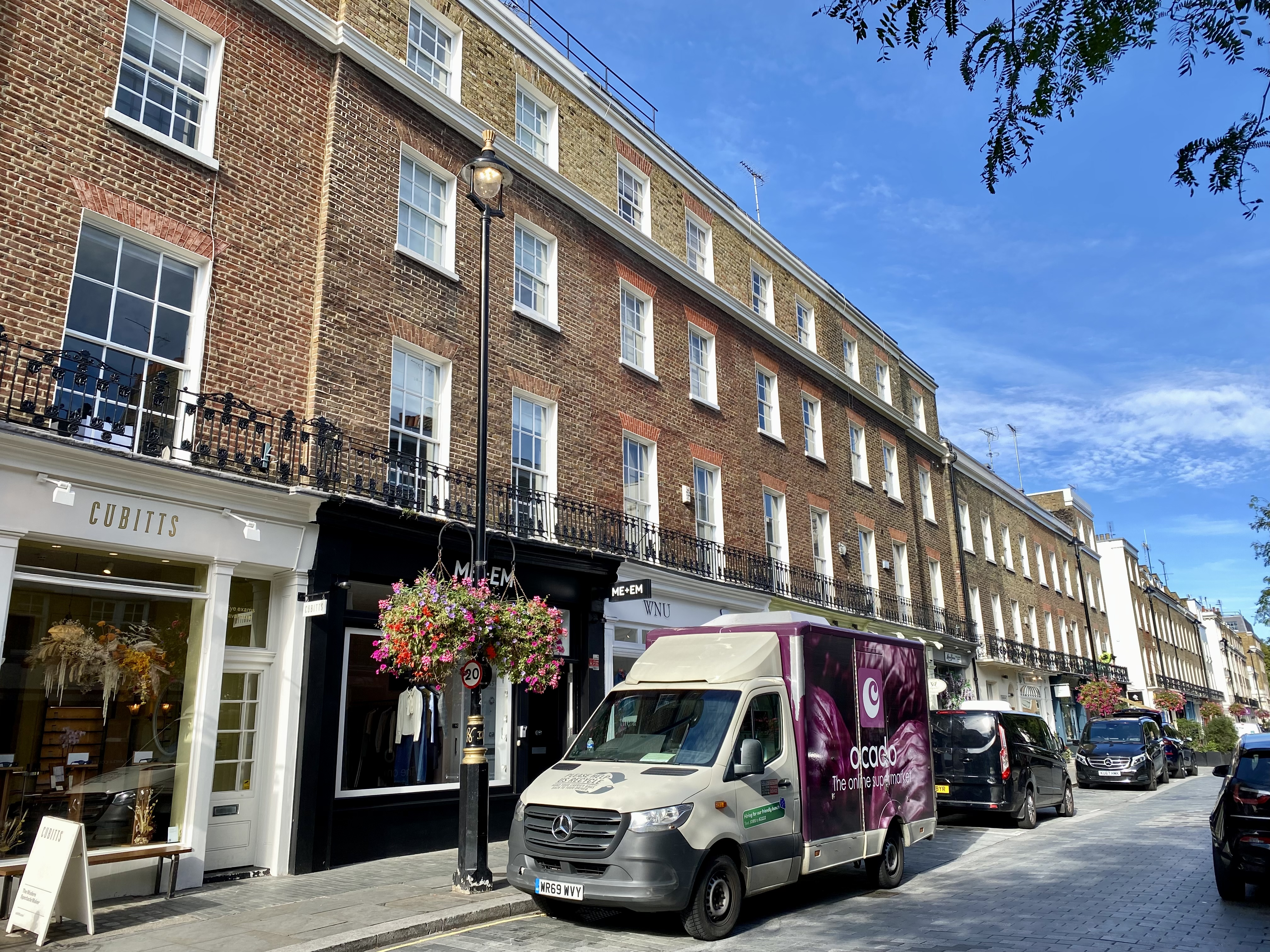
- 43-53 Elizabeth Street, taken in September 2024
- Interactive map of Elizabeth Street, London

Elizabeth Street is a road in the Belgravia district of central London.

It runs north-west to south-east from its junction with Eaton Square to Buckingham Palace Road. It also intersects with Chester Square and is crossed by Ebury Street.

The street was named after Elizabeth Leveson-Gower, wife of Richard Grosvenor, 2nd Marquess of Westminster.

== Notable properties ==
- St Michael's House, 2 Elizabeth Street, grade II listed
- 38A-42, grade II listed
- 45-53, grade II listed
- 44, The Thomas Cubitt, a pub named for Thomas Cubitt
- 50-58, grade II listed
- 55-63, grade II listed
- 65-79, grade II listed
- 72a was the last residence of John Bingham, 7th Earl of Lucan in 1974, when he disappeared following the murder of children's nanny, Sandra Rivett, and the attempted murder of his estranged wife Veronica, at the family home at 46 Lower Belgrave Street, a short walk away.
