= Blackstone Chambers =

Set of barristers' chambers in London

Blackstone Chambers is a set of barristers' chambers in the Temple district of central London. Established in the 1950s, as of 2022 it had 119 tenants, of whom more than 50 are silks.

Current notable members include Robert Anderson, Michael Beloff, Michael Bloch, Sir James Eadie (current First Treasury Counsel), Sir David Edward, Dinah Rose, Lord Keen of Elie, Harish Salve, Lord Pannick, Lord Woolf, Adrian Briggs, Tom Hickman, Sir Jeffrey Jowell. Former notable set members include Sir Ian Brownlie, Lord Lester of Herne Hill, and Guy Goodwin-Gill.

Members of chambers specialise in public and administrative law and include some of the leading advocates in that field. human rights, commercial & international law. Their barristers have acted in high-profile cases such as R (Miller) v The Prime Minister and Cherry v Advocate General for Scotland, Newcastle United FC v the Premier League, Big Brother Watch (and others) V The United Kingdom and Begum V Secretary of State for the Home Department.

== Notes and sources ==
Notes

Sources

- Blackstone Chambers. London: Chambers and Partners. Archived from the original on 8 December 2011.
- "Blackstone Chambers: About Us". London: Blackstone Chambers. Archived from the original on 2 November 2011.
- Dowell, Katy (2011). "The Bar". The Lawyer. London: Centaur Media. Archived from the original on 26 November 2011.
- Sands, Philippe (12 January 2010). "Sir Ian Brownlie obituary". The Guardian. London: Guardian News and Media: 35.
