= Aiding and Abetting (novel) =

2000 novel by Muriel Spark

- First edition cover
- Author: Muriel Spark
- Cover artist: Andy Bridge
- Language: English
- Publisher: Viking Press
- Publication date: 26 July 2000
- Publication place: United Kingdom
- Media type: Print (Hardback & Paperback)
- ISBN: 0-14-029747-2
- OCLC: 47063403

Aiding and Abetting is a novel written by Muriel Spark and published in 2000, six years before her death. Unlike her other novels, it draws inspiration from a documented occurrence; however, the author acknowledges in a note that she has taken liberties with the facts.

== Plot summary ==
The central figure in the novel is Hildegarde Wolf, a fraudulent psychiatrist also known as Beate Pappenheim, who practices in Paris. She finds herself with two patients, both claiming to be Lord Lucan, an English earl who, in a real-life event in London in 1974, mistakenly killed his daughter's nanny, believing her to be his wife. Building upon this premise, the novel unfolds with a series of humorous coincidences and improbable situations, as the two "Lucans" blackmail Dr. Wolf. The tragic mix-up between the nanny and the wife serves as a mirrored reflection in the intertwined destinies of the two Lucans. In the final chapters set in Africa, there is a reminiscent quality of Evelyn Waugh's novel A Handful of Dust (1934), who was a model and occasional mentor to Muriel Spark.

== Reception ==
John Updike in The New Yorker described the novel as "one of the best of her sui-generis novels". Alex Clark in The Guardian called it "ambitious, rewardingly complex ... [an] exceptionally intelligent book. It is hard to think of another writer who could devise such a brashly absurd plot and then execute it with both flair and gravity". The Independent described it as "Part Buchanesque romp through the Scottish glens, part chilling psycho-drama". Kirkus Reviews said "Quick, incisive, often entertaining, sometimes mysterious, at a moment or two compelling, but overall and generally, slight. Yet, from this venerable author, even slight is still Sparkian".
