= Plumbers Arms, Belgravia =

Pub in Belgravia, London

The Plumbers Arms
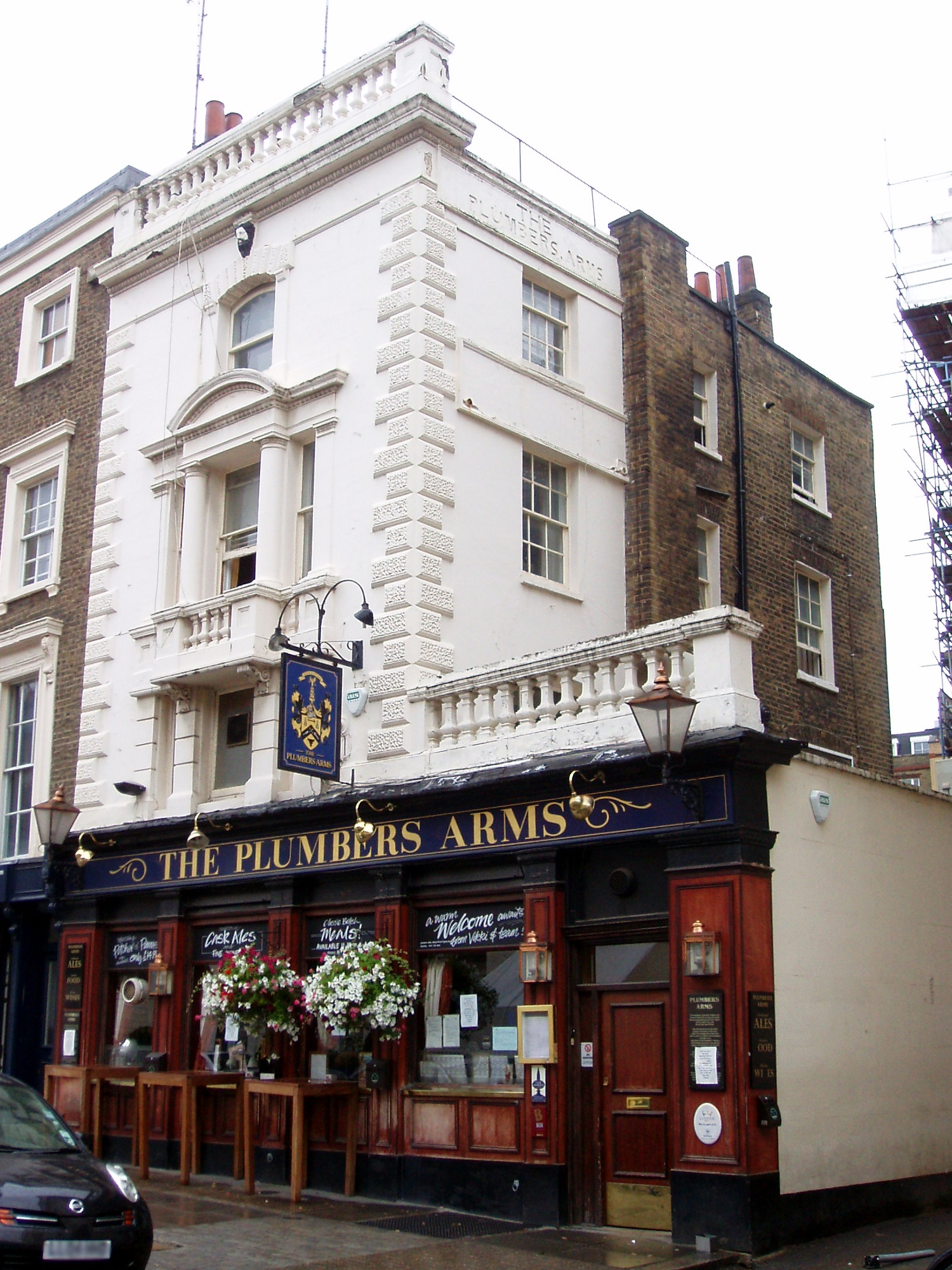
- The Plumbers Arms
- Interactive map of The Plumbers Arms
- Location: 14 Lower Belgrave Street, Belgravia, London SW1
- Coordinates: 51°29′47.4″N 0°8′51.36″W
- Website: The Plumbers Arms

Listed Building – Grade II
- Official name: THE PLUMBERS ARMS PUBLIC HOUSE
- Designated: 01-Dec-1987
- Reference no.: 1222426

The Plumbers Arms is a Grade II listed public house at 14 Lower Belgrave Street, Belgravia, London SW1.

It is where Lady Lucan burst in on the evening of 7 November 1974, covered in blood and fearing for her own life, after discovering that her husband, Lord Lucan, had murdered their nanny, Sandra Rivett. (Lord Lucan's subsequent disappearance means this case has never been tried in court, but his wife identified him as her assailant and he was named as the murderer at the coroner's inquest).

It was built mid-19th century.
