= Earl of Lucan =

Title in the peerage of Ireland

Earldom of Lucan
- Arms: Azure, a Bend cotised between six Crosses-Patée Or. Crest: On a Mound Vert, a Falcon rising wings expanded proper, armed membered and belled Or. Supporters: On either side a Wolf Azure, plain collared and chained Or.
- Creation date: 1 October 1795
- Created by: George III
- Peerage: Peerage of Ireland
- First holder: Charles Bingham, 1st Baron Lucan
- Present holder: George Bingham, 8th Earl of Lucan
- Heir apparent: Charles Lars John Bingham, Lord Bingham
- Remainder to: The 1st Earl's heirs male of the body lawfully begotten
- Subsidiary titles: Baron Lucan; Baron Bingham; Baronet 'of Castlebar'
- Status: Extant
- Former seats: The Lawn, Castlebar; Laleham House
- Motto: SPES MEA CHRISTUS (Christ is my hope)

Earldom of Lucan (Jacobite Creation)
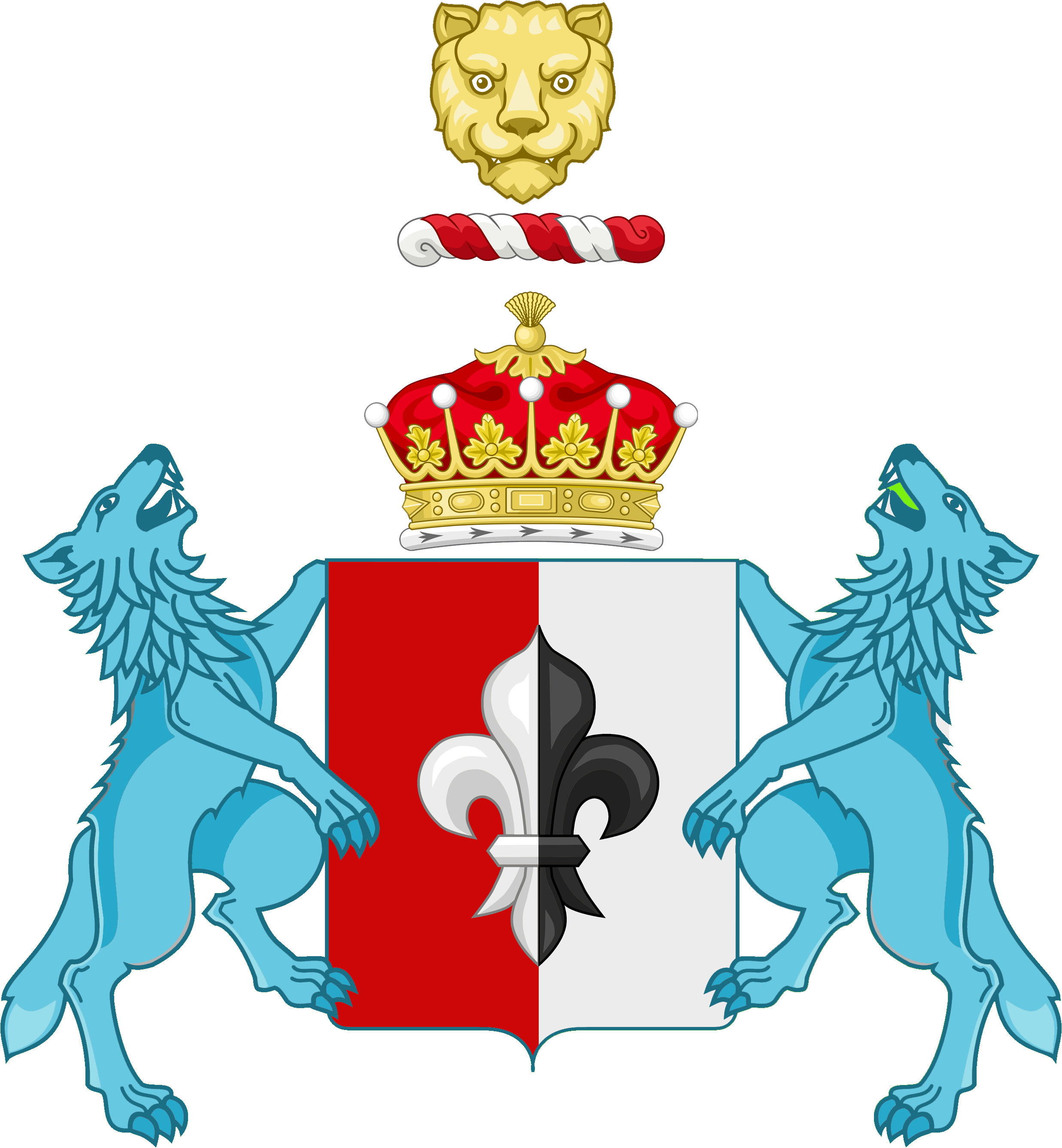
- Arms: Per pale Gules and Argent, a Fleur-de-lis per pale Argent and Sable. Crest: A Leopard's Face Or. Supporters: On either side a Wolf Azure.
- Creation date: c. 1691
- Created by: James II whilst in exile
- Peerage: Jacobite Peerage
- First holder: Patrick Sarsfield
- Last holder: James Sarsfield, 2nd Earl of Lucan
- Remainder to: The 1st Earl's heirs male of the body lawfully begotten
- Subsidiary titles: Viscount of Tully; Baron Rosberry
- Status: Extinct
- Extinction date: 12 May 1719
- Motto: VIRTUS NON VERTITUR (Virtue does not turn)
- Being a Jacobite creation, this peerage has never been legally recognised in Britain

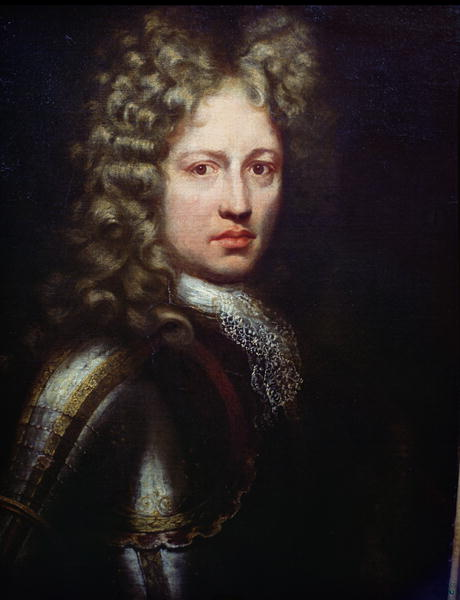
Patrick Sarsfield, 1st Earl of Lucan

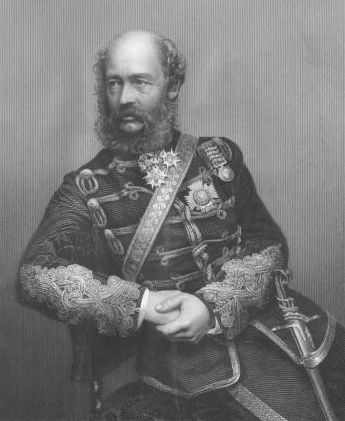
George Bingham, 3rd Earl of Lucan

Earl of Lucan is a title which has been created twice in the Peerage of Ireland for related families.

== History ==
Patrick Sarsfield was one of the senior commanders of James II (deposed in 1688) in battles in Ireland with William III, which determined the latter's takeover with his co-wife, Mary II, of the English, Scottish and Irish thrones (the Glorious Revolution and First Jacobite Wars). In 1691, the deposed King James purportedly created him Earl of Lucan, Viscount of Tully and Baron Rosberry. Like all post deposition titles they have no recognition in UK law.

In 1795, the first legal creation of title was for Sarsfield's similarly landowning great-nephew, Charles Bingham, 1st Baron Lucan.

The subsidiary titles associated with the Earldom of Lucan are: Baron Lucan, of Castlebar in the County of Mayo (created 1776), and Baron Bingham, of Melcombe Bingham in the County of Dorset (created 1934). The first is in the Peerage of Ireland, whereas the second is in the Peerage of the United Kingdom, which allowed Earls of Lucan to sit in the House of Lords after the practice of electing Irish representative peer ceased. The Earl of Lucan also has a Baronetcy (of Castlebar, Co Mayo), created in the Baronetage of Nova Scotia (7 June 1634).

The title became notorious when the 3rd Earl, as cavalry commander in the Crimean War, was involved in the ill-fated Charge of the Light Brigade.

Its notoriety was renewed after the disappearance in 1974 of the profligate 7th Earl. In June 1975, in his absence, a coroner's jury found that he had murdered his children's nanny, Sandra Rivett. There have been no confirmed sightings of the 7th Earl since his disappearance, and he was declared legally dead for purposes of probate (debts and assets) in October 1999. This was, alone, insufficient to enable his son George, Lord Bingham to succeed to the titles – a death certificate for the 7th Earl was issued in February 2016 under the Presumption of Death Act 2013, and Lord Bingham's claim to the Earldom was formally accepted by the House of Lords on 7 June 2016.

The family seats were Castlebar House, near Gorteendrunagh, County Mayo, and from 1803 to 1922 Laleham House in Laleham, Surrey (until 1965 in the former county of Middlesex).

== Bingham Baronets, of Castlebar (1634) ==
- Sir Henry Bingham, 1st Baronet (1573–c. 1658)
- Sir George Bingham, 2nd Baronet (c. 1625–1682)
- Sir Henry Bingham, 3rd Baronet (died c. 1714)
- Sir George Bingham, 4th Baronet (died c. 1730)
- Sir John Bingham, 5th Baronet (c. 1696–1749)
- Sir John Bingham, 6th Baronet (1730–1750)
- Sir Charles Bingham, 7th Baronet (1735–1799) (created Baron Lucan in 1776, and Earl of Lucan in 1795)

== Earls of Lucan (1795) ==
- Charles Bingham, 1st Earl of Lucan (1735–1799)
- Richard Bingham, 2nd Earl of Lucan (1764–1839)
- George Charles Bingham, 3rd Earl of Lucan (1800–1888)
- Charles George Bingham, 4th Earl of Lucan (1830–1914)
- George Charles Bingham, 5th Earl of Lucan (1860–1949)
- George Charles Patrick Bingham, 6th Earl of Lucan (1898–1964)
- Richard John Bingham, 7th Earl of Lucan (born 1934; missing since 1974; declared dead 1999; death certificate issued 2016)
- George Charles Bingham, 8th Earl of Lucan (born 1967)

The heir apparent is the present holder's son Charles Lars John Bingham, Lord Bingham (born 2020).

== See also ==
- Baron Clanmorris
