= Lady Camilla Bingham =

British barrister

Lady Camilla Bingham KC
- Born: 30 June 1970 (age 55)
- Education: Balliol College, Oxford
- Spouse: Michael Bloch (m. 1998)
- Children: 4
- Parents: John Bingham, 7th Earl of Lucan (father); Veronica Mary Duncan (mother)
- Relatives: George Bingham, 8th Earl of Lucan (brother)

Lady Camilla Bingham KC (born 30 June 1970) is a British barrister.

Her practice is in corporate and commercial law, in litigation and arbitration, specialising in jurisdiction and conflict of laws. She works mostly in England and Wales and is also a member of the bars of the Grand Court of the Cayman Islands and the Supreme Court of the Eastern Caribbean.

== Background and early life ==
Bingham is the daughter of John Bingham, 7th Earl of Lucan, and his wife Veronica Mary Duncan. Her father disappeared in November 1974 after the murder of the family nanny Sandra Rivett. She was educated at St Swithun's School, Winchester, and Balliol College, Oxford, then was admitted to the Inner Temple and was called to the bar in 1996.

== Career ==
Bingham is a member of the One Essex Court chambers. Her legal practice is in corporate and commercial law, on cases arising in England and Wales and overseas, in arbitration as well as litigation. She specializes in issues concerning jurisdiction and conflict of laws and is a contributor to Gore-Browne on Companies. She is also a member of the bars of the Grand Court of the Cayman Islands and the Supreme Court of the Eastern Caribbean, and her name is on the Register of Practitioners (Part II) in Dubai.

She was appointed as a Queen's Counsel in 2013.

== Personal life ==
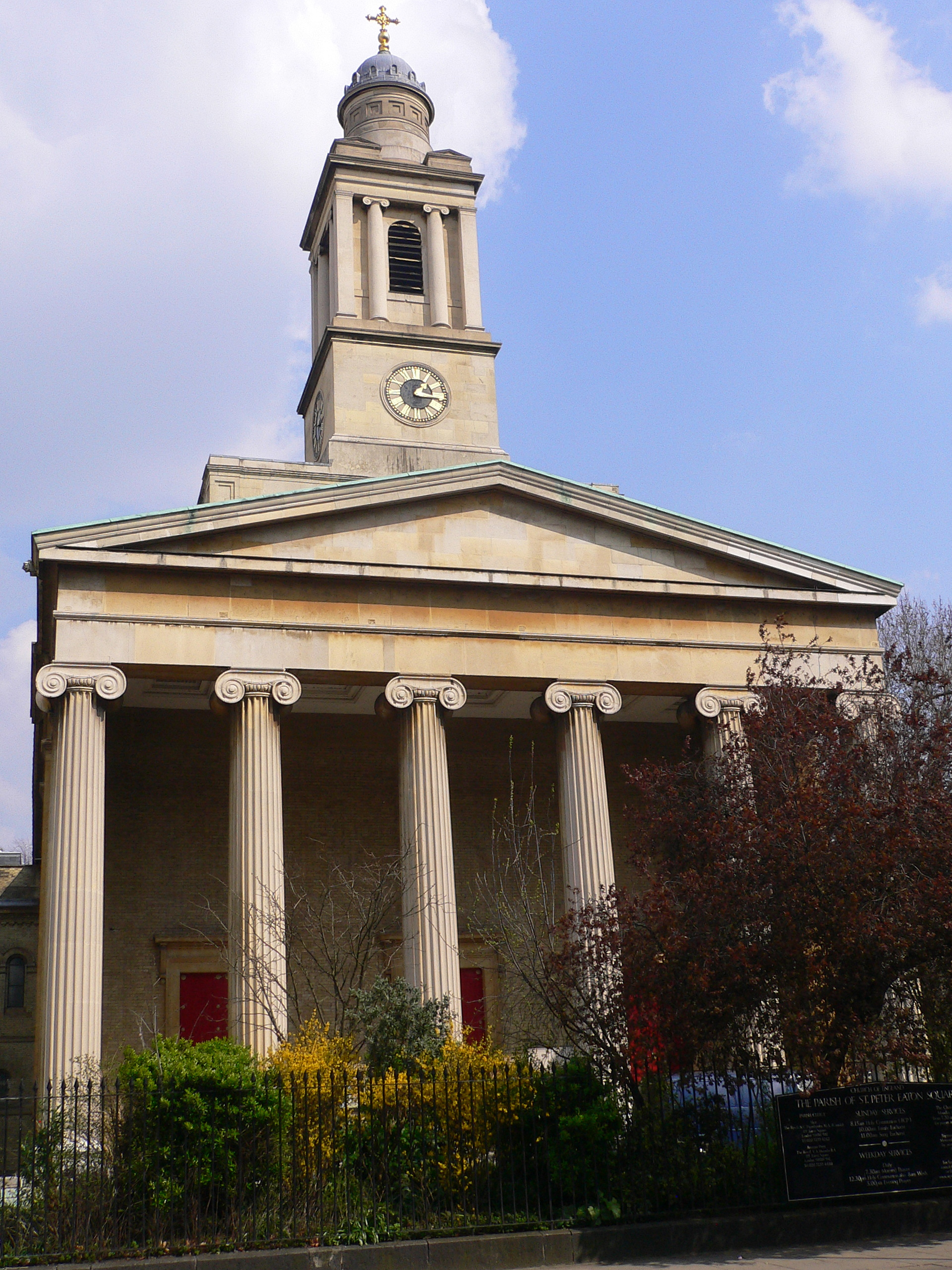
St Peter's, Eaton Square

On 12 September 1998 she married Michael Bloch KC, also a barrister, at St Peter's Church, Eaton Square, Belgravia. At the wedding, their three page-boys all wore court dress, including barristers' wigs.

In March 2002, Bingham announced the birth of her first child. She has four sons, as well as two step-daughters from her husband's previous marriage.

When Bingham's mother, Lady Lucan, died in 2017, she stated in her will that she was leaving all her money to Shelter because of her children's "lack of good manners", having not spoken to them since the 1980s. Her brother George commented "I applaud the decision".
