= Michael Eastham =

Barrister and Judge

Sir Thomas Michael Eastham (26 June 1920 – 4 March 1993) was a British barrister and judge. He was a High Court judge, sitting in the Family Division, from 1978 until his death in 1993.
