= John Bingham, 7th Earl of Lucan =

British peer and missing murder suspect

The Right Honourable The Earl of Lucan
- Lucan and Veronica in 1963
- Other titles: Baron Bingham; Baron Lucan; Baronet Bingham of Castlebar; Lord Lucan
- Born: Richard John Bingham; 18 December 1934; Marylebone, London, England
- Disappeared: 8 November 1974 (aged 39); Uckfield, East Sussex, England
- Status: Presumed dead on 27 October 1999, with an official death certificate being issued on 3 February 2016
- Other name: Lucky Lucan
- Occupations: Banker; professional gambler
- Title: 7th Earl of Lucan
- Predecessor: George Bingham, 6th Earl
- Successor: George Bingham, 8th Earl
- Spouse: Veronica Mary Duncan (m. 1963; sep. 1973)
- Children: 3, including George, 8th Earl of Lucan, and Camilla Bloch
- Parents: George Bingham, 6th Earl of Lucan (father); Kaitlin Dawson (mother)
- Military career
- Allegiance: United Kingdom
- Branch: British Army
- Service years: 1953–1955
- Rank: Second lieutenant
- Unit: Coldstream Guards

Richard John Bingham, 7th Earl of Lucan (born 18 December 1934 – disappeared 8 November 1974; declared dead 27 October 1999), commonly known as Lord Lucan, was a British peer and gambler who vanished in 1974 after being suspected of killing Sandra Rivett, his children's nanny, and attempting to murder his wife. An evacuee during World War II, Lucan attended Eton College and served with the Coldstream Guards in West Germany from 1953 to 1955. He developed a taste for gambling, playing backgammon and bridge, and became an early member of the exclusive group of wealthy British gamblers at the Clermont Club. His losses often exceeded his winnings, yet he left his job at a London-based merchant bank and became a professional gambler. He was known as Lord Bingham from April 1949 until January 1964.

Lucan was known for his expensive tastes, racing power boats, and driving an Aston Martin. (Note: Lucan was rumoured to have been briefly considered by Albert R. Broccoli for the role of James Bond) In 1963, he married Veronica Duncan, with whom he had three children. The couple moved to 46 Lower Belgrave Street, Belgravia, in 1967, paying £17,500 for the house (equivalent to £280,000 in 2025). After the marriage collapsed in late 1972, he moved out to a nearby property in January 1973, when they formally separated. A bitter custody battle ensued, which Lucan eventually lost. Obsessed with regaining custody, he began to spy on his wife and record their telephone conversations. This fixation, combined with mounting legal expenses and gambling losses, had a dramatic effect on his life and personal finances.

On the night of 7 November 1974, Sandra Rivett was murdered in the Lucan family home. A wounded Veronica burst into the Plumbers Arms; she claimed to have been attacked by her husband and that he had admitted to killing Rivett. Lucan telephoned his mother, asking her to collect his children, before driving to visit a friend in Uckfield, East Sussex. He also penned letters protesting his innocence, claiming that he had fought with an intruder who attacked his wife and that she accused him of hiring a hitman to kill her. In the early hours of 8 November, Lucan drove off. His car was found abandoned in Newhaven, but he was never found. At the inquest into Rivett's death, held in June 1975, the jury returned a verdict naming Lucan as her killer. He was declared legally dead in 1999, and a death certificate issued in 2016 allowed his titles to be inherited by his son George. Lucan's involvement in Rivett's murder and his fate remain the subject of debate, various theories, and continuing research.

== Early life and education ==
Lucan was born Richard John Bingham on 18 December 1934 at 19 Bentinck Street, Marylebone, London, the second child and elder son of George Bingham, 6th Earl of Lucan, an Anglo-Irish peer, who was the son of Col. George Charles Bingham, 5th Earl of Lucan, and his wife Violet Sylvia Blanche Spender-Clay. Lucan was the great-great-grandson of George Bingham, 3rd Earl of Lucan, who was partly responsible for the disastrous Charge of the Light Brigade. Lucan's mother was Kaitlin Elizabeth Anne née Dawson. A blood clot found in her lung forced her to remain in a nursing home, so John, as he became known, was initially cared for by the family's nurserymaid, Lucy Sellers. Aged three, Lucan attended a pre-prep school in Tite Street with his elder sister Jane. In 1939, with the Second World War approaching, the two were taken to the relative safety of Wales.

In 1940, joined by their younger siblings Sally and Hugh, the Lucan children travelled to Toronto in Canada, moving shortly afterwards to Mount Kisco, New York, United States. They stayed for five years with multi-millionairess Marcia Brady Tucker. Lucan was enrolled at The Harvey School and spent summer holidays away from his siblings at a camp in the Adirondack Mountains.

While in the US, Lucan and his siblings lived in grandeur and wanted for nothing, but on their return to England in February 1945 they were faced with the stark realities of wartime Britain. Rationing was still in force, their former home at Cheyne Walk had been bombed, and the family's house at 22 Eaton Square had its windows blown out. Despite the family's noble ancestry, (Note: Lucan's ancestry contains many royal connections. His grandmother was a lady-in-waiting to the Duchess of Albany and could count Princess Alice, Countess of Athlone, among her friends. His great-aunt was a woman-of-the-bedchamber to Mary of Teck. His grandfather, George Bingham, 5th Earl of Lucan, was Lord-in-waiting to King George V. The family is also linked to the family of Diana, Princess of Wales.) the 6th Earl and his wife were agnostics and socialists who preferred a more austere existence than that offered by Tucker, an extremely wealthy Christian. For a time, Lucan suffered nightmares and was taken to a psychotherapist. As an adult he remained an agnostic, but ensured that his children attended Sunday school, preferring to give them a traditional childhood.

At Eton College, Lucan developed a taste for gambling. He supplemented his pocket money with income from bookmaking, placing his earnings into a "secret" bank account, and regularly left the school's grounds to attend horse races. According to his mother, his academic record was "far from creditable", but he became captain of Roe's House before leaving in 1953 to undertake his National Service. He became a second lieutenant in his father's regiment, the Coldstream Guards, and was stationed mainly in Krefeld, West Germany. While there, he also became a keen poker player.

== Career ==
On leaving the British Army in 1955, Lucan joined William Brandt's Sons and Co., a London-based merchant bank, on an annual salary of £500 (£12,400 in 2026). In 1960, he met Stephen Raphael, a rich stockbroker who was a skilled backgammon player. (Note: Raphael's wife, Eve, later became godmother to Lucan's first child, Frances.) They holidayed together in the Bahamas, went water-skiing, and played golf, backgammon, and poker. Lucan became a regular gambler and an early member of John Aspinall's Clermont gaming club, located in Berkeley Square.

Lucan often won at games of skill such as backgammon and bridge, but he also accumulated huge losses. On one occasion he lost £8,000, about two-thirds of the money he received annually from various family trusts. On another disastrous night at a casino he lost £10,000. His uncle by marriage, stockbroker John Bevan, helped him to pay that debt, and Lucan repaid him two years later.

Lucan left Brandt's around 1960, shortly after he had won £26,000 playing chemin de fer. A colleague had been promoted before him, leading Lucan to leave his job in protest, saying, "Why should I work in a bank, when I can earn a year's money in one single night at the tables?" He travelled to the US, where he played golf, raced power boats, and drove his Aston Martin around the West Coast. He also visited his elder sister Jane and his former guardian, Marcia Tucker. On his return to England he moved out of his parents' home in St John's Wood and into a flat in Park Crescent.

== Personal life ==
=== Marriage and lifestyle ===
Lucan met his future wife, Veronica Duncan, early in 1963. She was born in 1937 to Major Charles Moorhouse Duncan and his wife, Thelma. On 21 January 1939, Veronica's father died in a car accident, when she was less than two years old, after which the family moved to South Africa. Her mother remarried, and the family returned to England, where her new stepfather became manager of a hotel in Guildford. With her sister, Christina, she was educated at St Swithun's School, Winchester.

After displaying a talent for art, Veronica studied at an art college in Bournemouth. The two sisters later shared a flat in London, where Veronica worked as a model and later as a secretary. Christina's marriage to the wealthy William Shand Kydd (half-brother to Peter Shand Kydd, stepfather of Diana Spencer, later Princess of Wales) introduced her to London high society, and it was at a golf club function in the country that Veronica and Lucan first met.

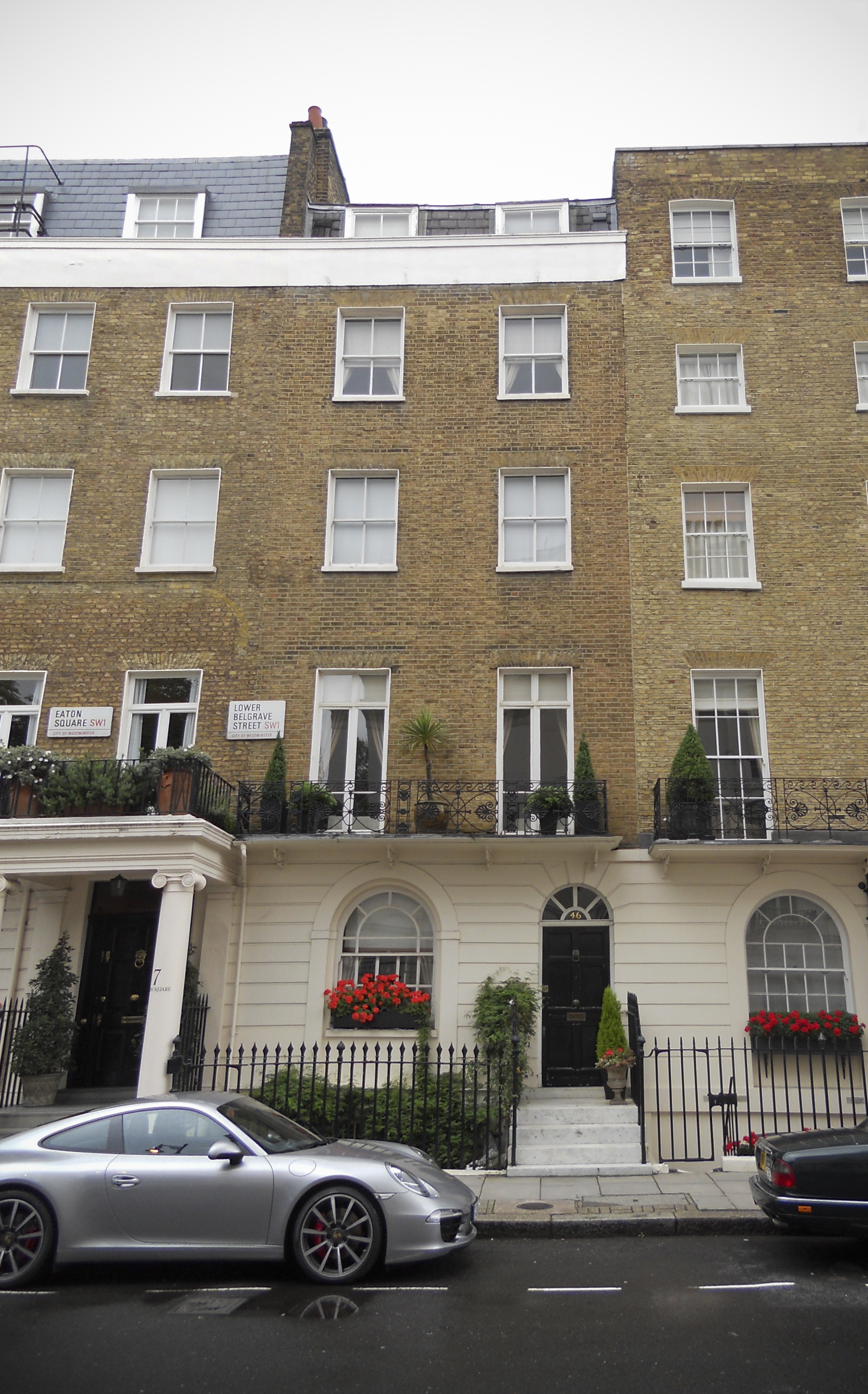
46 Lower Belgrave Street in Belgravia

News of their engagement appeared in The Times and The Daily Telegraph newspapers on 14 October 1963, and the two were married at Holy Trinity Church, Brompton, on 20 November. The ceremony was attended by Princess Alice, Countess of Athlone (to whom Veronica's mother had been lady-in-waiting). The couple honeymooned in Europe, travelling first class on the Orient Express. Lucan's already embattled finances were given a welcome boost by his father, who provided him with a marriage settlement designed to finance a larger family home and any future additions to the Lucan family. Lucan repaid some of his creditors and purchased 46 Lower Belgrave Street in Belgravia, redecorating it to suit Veronica's tastes.

Two months after the wedding, on 21 January 1964, Lucan's father died of a stroke. In addition to a reputed £250,000 inheritance, (Note: "The former Lord Lucan was reputed to have inherited one-quarter of a million pounds along with his title and clearly, for all to see, had the money to indulge an expensive range of sporting passions.") Lucan acquired his father's titles: Earl of Lucan; Baron Lucan of Castlebar; Baron Bingham of Melcombe Bingham and Baronet Bingham of Castlebar. His wife became the Countess of Lucan.

The couple had three children:

- Lady Frances Bingham, born on 24 October 1964
- George Bingham, 8th Earl of Lucan, born on 21 September 1967
- Lady Camilla Bingham, born on 30 June 1970.

Following the 1964 birth of their first daughter, Frances, and from early in 1965, they employed a nanny, Lillian Jenkins, to look after her. Lucan tried to teach Veronica about gambling and traditional pursuits like hunting, shooting, and fishing. He bought her golf lessons; she later gave up the sport.

Lucan's daily routine consisted of breakfast at 9:00 am, coffee, dealing with the morning's letters, reading the newspapers, and playing the piano. He sometimes jogged in the park and took his Dobermann for walks. Lunch at the Clermont Club was followed by afternoon games of backgammon. Returning home to change into black tie, Lucan typically spent the remainder of the day at the Clermont, gambling into the early hours, watched sometimes by Veronica. In 1965, while still working at Brandt's, he wrote of his desire to have "£2m in the bank", claiming that "motor-cars, yachts, expensive holidays, and security for the future would give myself and a lot of other people a lot of pleasure".

Lucan was described by his friends as a shy and taciturn man, but with his tall stature, "luxuriant guardsman's moustache," and masculine pursuits, his exploits made him popular. His profligacy extended to hiring private aircraft to take his friends to the races, asking a car dealer he knew to source an Aston Martin drophead coupé, drinking expensive Russian vodka, and racing power boats. In September 1966, he unsuccessfully screen tested for a part in Woman Times Seven, prompting him to decline a later offer from film producer Albert R. Broccoli to screen test him for the role of James Bond.

As a professional gambler, Lucan was a skilled player, once rated among the world's top 10 backgammon competitors. He won the St James's Club tournament and was champion of the west coast of America. He gained the moniker "Lucky" Lucan, but his losses easily outweighed his winnings, and in reality he was anything but lucky. Lucan had interests in thoroughbred horses; in 1968 he paid more in race entry fees than he received in winnings. Despite some arguments over money, Veronica remained largely ignorant of his losses, retaining the use of accounts at Savile Row tailors and various Knightsbridge shops.

Following the births of George and Camilla, Veronica suffered postnatal depression. Lucan became increasingly involved in her mental well-being, and in 1971 took her for treatment at a psychiatric clinic in Hampstead, where she refused to be admitted. Instead, she agreed to home visits from a psychiatrist and a course of antidepressants. In July 1972, the family holidayed in Monte Carlo, but Veronica quickly returned to England, leaving Lucan with their two elder children. The combined pressures of maintaining their finances, the costs of Lucan's gambling addiction, and Veronica's weakened mental condition took their toll on the marriage. Two weeks after a strained family Christmas in 1972, Lucan moved into a small property in Eaton Row. Veronica later described this as the point of their formal separation in January 1973.

=== Separation ===
Some months later Lucan moved again, to a larger rented flat in nearby Elizabeth Street. Despite an early attempt by his wife at reconciliation, by that point all Lucan wanted from the marriage was custody of his children. In an effort to demonstrate that Veronica was unfit to look after them, he began to spy on his family; his car was regularly seen parked in Lower Belgrave Street. He later employed private detectives to perform the same task. He also canvassed doctors, who explained that his wife had not "gone mad", but was suffering from depression and anxiety.

Lucan told his friends that nobody would work for Veronica. She had sacked Jenkins, the children's long-term nanny, in December 1972. Of the series of nannies employed in the house, one, 26-year-old Stefanja Sawicka, was told by Veronica that Lucan had hit her with a cane and had, on one occasion, pushed her down the stairs. Veronica apparently feared for her safety and told Sawicka not to be surprised "if he kills me one day."

Sawicka's time at the Lucan household ended late in March 1973. While with two of the children near Grosvenor Place, she was confronted by Lucan and two private detectives. They told her that the children had been made wards of court and that she must release them into his custody, which she did. Frances was collected from school later in the day. Veronica applied to the court to have the children returned, but concerned about the case's complexity, the judge set a date for the hearing three months ahead, for June 1973.

To defend herself against Lucan's claims about her mental state, Veronica booked herself a four-day stay at the Priory Clinic in Roehampton. While it was acknowledged that she still required some psychiatric support, the doctors reported that there was no indication that she was mentally ill. Lucan's case depended on Veronica's being unable to care for the children, but at the hearing he was instead forced to defend his own behaviour toward her. After several weeks of witnesses and protracted arguments in camera, and on the advice of his lawyers, he conceded the case. Unimpressed by Lucan's character, Mr Justice Rees awarded custody to Veronica. Lucan was allowed access every other weekend.

Thus began a bitter dispute between the couple, involving many of their friends and Veronica's own sister. Lucan again began to watch his wife's movements. He recorded some of their telephone conversations with a small Sony tape recorder and played excerpts to any friends prepared to listen. He also told them – and his bank manager – that Veronica had been "spending money like water". Lucan continued to pay her £40 a week and may have cancelled their regular food order with Harrods. He delayed payment to the milkman and – knowing that Veronica was required by the court to employ a live-in nanny – the childcare agency. With no income of her own, Veronica took a part-time job in a local hospital.

A temporary nanny, Elizabeth Murphy, was befriended by Lucan, who bought her drinks and asked her for information on his wife. He instructed his detective agency to investigate Murphy, looking for evidence that she was failing in her duty of care to his children. This they found. He dispensed with the agency's services when they presented him with bills amounting to several hundred pounds. Murphy was later hospitalised with cancer. Another temporary nanny, Christabel Martin, reported strange telephone calls to the house, some with heavy breathing and some from a man asking for non-existent people. Following a series of temporary nannies, Sandra Rivett started work in late 1974.

=== Gambling ===
Losing the court case proved devastating for Lucan. It had cost him an estimated £20,000; by late 1974 his financial position was dire. As he drank more heavily and started chain-smoking, his friends began to worry. In drunken conversations with some of them, including Aspinall and his mother Lady Osborne, Lucan discussed murdering his wife. Greville Howard later gave a statement to the police describing how Lucan had talked of how killing his wife might save him from bankruptcy, how her body might be disposed of in the Solent, and how he "would never be caught". (Note: This conversation, which Howard thought was "drunken rambling", was not revealed to the inquest jury.)

Lucan borrowed £4,000 from his mother and asked Tucker for a loan of £100,000. Having no luck there, he wrote to Tucker's son, explaining how he wished to "buy" his children from Veronica; the money was not forthcoming. He turned to his friends and acquaintances, asking anyone plausible to loan him money to fund his gambling addiction. The financier James Goldsmith guaranteed a £5,000 overdraft for him, which for years remained unpaid.

Lucan also applied to the discreet Edgware Trust. On request, he supplied details of his income, which was apparently around £12,000 a year from various family trusts. He was required to provide a surety and received only £3,000 of the £5,000 he asked for. Much to their managers' consternation, his four bank accounts were overdrawn; Coutts, £2,841; Lloyds, £4,379; National Westminster, £1,290; Midland, £5,667. Even though by then he was playing for much lower stakes than had previously been the case, Lucan's gambling remained completely out of control. Ranson (1994) estimates that between September and October 1974 alone, Lucan ran up debts of around £50,000. Taki Theodoracopulos, who recalled Lucan as a close friend for more than a decade, lent him £3,000 in cash three nights before the murder.

Despite these problems, from late October 1974, Lucan's demeanour appeared to change for the better. His best man, John Wilbraham, remarked that Lucan's apparent obsession over regaining his children had diminished. While having dinner with his mother he cast aside talk of his family problems and turned instead to politics. On 6 November, he met his uncle John Bevan, apparently in good spirits. Later that day he met 21-year-old Charlotte Andrina Colquhoun, who said that "he seemed very happy, just his usual self, and there was nothing to suggest that he was worried or depressed". He also dined at the Clermont with racing driver Graham Hill.

At the time, casinos could open only between 2:00 pm and 4:00 am, so Lucan often gambled into the early hours. He took tablets to deal with his insomnia and therefore usually awoke around lunchtime. On 7 November, though, he broke routine and called his solicitor early in the morning, and at 10:30 am took a call from Colquhoun. They arranged to eat at the Clermont at about 3:00 pm, but Lucan failed to appear. Colquhoun drove past the Clermont and Ladbroke clubs, and past Elizabeth Street, but could not find Lucan's car anywhere. He also failed to arrive for his 1:00 pm lunch appointment with artist Dominic Elwes and banker Daniel Meinertzhagen, again at the Clermont.

At 4:00 pm, Lucan called at a chemist's on Lower Belgrave Street, close to Veronica's home, and asked the pharmacist there to identify a small capsule. It turned out to be Limbitrol 5, a drug for the treatment of anxiety and depression. Lucan had apparently made several similar visits since he separated from his wife; he never told the pharmacist where he got the drugs. At 4:45 pm, he called a friend, literary agent Michael Hicks-Beach; between 6:30 pm and 7:00 pm, Lucan met with him at Hicks-Beach's flat on Elizabeth Street. Lucan wanted his help with an article on gambling he had been asked to write for an Oxford University magazine.

Lucan drove Hicks-Beach home at about 8:00 pm, not in his Mercedes-Benz, but in "an old, dark, and scruffy Ford", possibly a Ford Corsair he had borrowed from Michael Stoop several weeks earlier. At 8:30 pm, he called the Clermont to check on a reservation for dinner with Greville Howard and friends. Howard had called him at 5:15 pm and asked if he wished to come to the theatre, but Lucan had declined and made the alternative suggestion to meet at the Clermont at 11:00 pm. He failed to arrive and did not answer his telephone when called.

== Murder of Sandra Rivett ==
=== Sandra Rivett ===
Sandra Eleanor Rivett

Rivett was born Sandra Eleanor Hensby on 16 September 1945, the third child of Albert and Eunice Hensby. The family moved to Australia when she was two years old, but returned in 1955. She was a popular child, described at school as "intelligent, although she does not excel academically". She worked for six months as an apprentice hairdresser before taking a job as a secretary in Croydon.

After a failed romance, Rivett became a voluntary patient at a mental hospital near Redhill, Surrey, where she was treated for depression. She became engaged to a builder named John and took a job as a children's nanny for a doctor in Croydon. On 13 March 1964, she gave birth to a boy named Stephen, but as her relationship with John was failing, she returned home to live with her parents and considered giving the baby up for adoption. Her parents took on the responsibility and adopted him in May 1965.

Rivett later worked at a home for the elderly before moving to Portsmouth to stay with her older sister. While there she met Roger Rivett; the two married on 10 June 1967 in Croydon. Roger served as a Royal Navy able seaman and later worked as a loader for British Road Services, while Rivett worked part-time at Reedham Orphanage in Purley. In mid-1973, Roger took a job on an Esso tanker, returning to their flat in Kenley a few months later, by which time Rivett was employed by a cigarette company in Croydon.

The marriage collapsed in May 1974 when, suspicious of Rivett's movements while he was away, Roger went to live with his parents. She was by then listed on the books of a Belgravia domestic agency and had been caring for an elderly couple in that district. A few weeks later she began to work for the Lucans.

Rivett normally went out with her boyfriend, John Hankins, on Thursday nights, but had changed her night off and had seen him the previous day. The two last spoke on the telephone at about 8:00 pm on Wednesday, 7 November.

Veronica later claimed that after putting the younger children to bed, at about 8:55 pm, Rivett asked her if she would like a cup of tea before heading downstairs to the basement kitchen to make one. Wondering what had delayed her nanny when she did not return, Veronica descended from the first floor and called to Rivett from the top of the basement stairs when she was attacked. As she screamed for her life, her attacker told her to "shut up." Veronica later claimed at that moment to have recognised her husband's voice. The two continued to fight. She bit his fingers, and when he threw her face down to the carpet, she managed to turn around and squeeze his testicles, causing him to release his grip on her throat and give up the fight. When she asked where Rivett was, Lucan was at first evasive, but eventually admitted to having killed her. Terrified, Veronica told him she could help him escape if he remained at the house for a few days, to allow her injuries to heal.

Lucan walked upstairs and sent his daughter to bed, then went into one of the bedrooms. When Veronica entered to lie on the bed, he told her to put towels down first to avoid staining the bedding. He asked her if she had any barbiturates and went to the bathroom to get a wet towel, supposedly to clean her face. Veronica realised her husband would be unable to hear her from the bathroom and made her escape, running outside to a nearby public house, the Plumbers Arms.

Lucan may have arrived at the Chester Square home of Madelaine Florman, mother of one of Frances's school friends, sometime between 10:00 pm and 10:30 pm. Alone in the house, Florman ignored the door, but shortly afterwards she received an incoherent telephone call and put the receiver down. Bloodstains, later found to be a mixture of blood groups A and B, were discovered on her doorstep. Lucan certainly called his mother between 10:30 pm and 11:00 pm and asked her to collect the children from Lower Belgrave Street. According to his mother, he spoke of a "terrible catastrophe" at his wife's home. He told her that he had been driving past the house when he saw Veronica fighting with a man in the basement. He had entered the property and found his wife screaming.

The location from which Lucan made this call, and possibly the call to Florman, remains unknown. The police forced their way into the home and discovered Rivett's body before Veronica was taken by ambulance to St George's Hospital. Lucan drove the Ford Corsair 42 miles (68 km) to Uckfield, East Sussex, to visit his friends, the Maxwell-Scotts. Susan Maxwell-Scott's meeting with Lucan was his last confirmed sighting.

=== Investigation ===
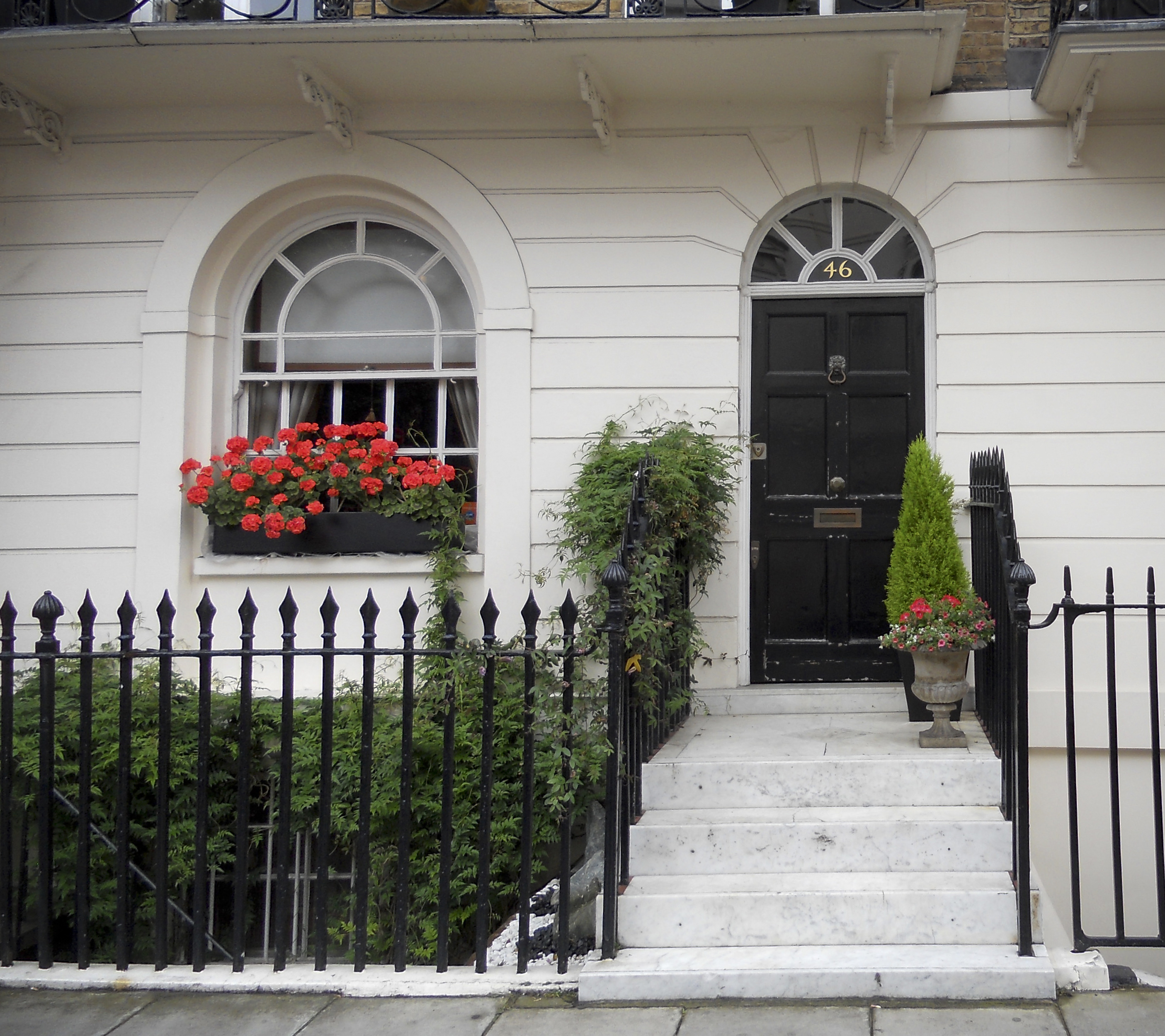
The front entrance to 46 Lower Belgrave Street

By the time Detective Chief Superintendent Roy Ranson arrived at Lower Belgrave Street early on 8 November, the divisional surgeon had pronounced Rivett dead, and forensic officers and photographers had been called to the property. The first two officers on the scene had discovered that the front door had been kicked in, with no other signs of a forced entry. A bloodstained towel was found in Veronica's first-floor bedroom. The area around the top of the basement staircase was heavily bloodstained.

A bloodstained lead pipe lay on the floor. Pictures hanging from the staircase walls were askew and a metal banister rail was damaged. At the foot of the stairs, two cups and saucers lay in a pool of blood. Rivett's arm protruded from a canvas sack, which lay in a slowly expanding pool of blood. The light fitting at the bottom of the stairs was missing its bulb; one was noted nearby on a chair. Blood was also found on various leaves in the adjoining rear garden.

Officers also searched 5 Eaton Row, into which Lucan had moved early in 1973, interviewed his mother, whom he had called to take the children to her home in St John's Wood, and searched his last address at 72a Elizabeth Street. Nothing untoward was found. On the bed, a suit and shirt lay alongside a book on Greek shipping millionaires, and Lucan's wallet, car keys, money, driving licence, handkerchief and spectacles were on a bedside table. His passport was in a drawer and his blue Mercedes-Benz parked outside, its engine cold and its battery flat.

Ranson then visited Veronica at St George's Hospital. Although heavily sedated, she was able to describe what had happened to her. A police officer was left to guard her should her assailant return. Rivett's body was taken to the mortuary, and a search was undertaken of all local basement areas and gardens, skips, and open spaces.

After removing her corpse from the canvas sack and beginning the post mortem examination, pathologist Keith Simpson told Ranson he was certain that Rivett had been killed before her body was placed in the sack, and that in his opinion the lead pipe found at the scene could be the murder weapon. Her estranged husband, Roger, had an alibi for the night concerned and was eliminated from police inquiries. Other male friends and boyfriends were questioned and discounted as suspects. Rivett's parents confirmed that she had a good working relationship with Veronica and was extremely fond of the children. Meanwhile, Lucan had yet to make an appearance, and so his description was circulated to police forces across the country. Newspapers and television stations were told only that Lucan was wanted by the police for questioning.

Hours earlier, Lucan had again called his mother, at about 12:30 am. He told her that he would be in touch later that day, but declined to speak with the police constable who had accompanied her to her flat; instead, he said he would call the police later that morning. Ranson discovered that Lucan had travelled to Uckfield when he was called by Ian Maxwell-Scott, who told him that Lucan had arrived at his home a few hours after the murder and spoken with his wife, Susan. While there, Lucan had written two letters to his brother-in-law, Bill Shand Kydd, and posted them to his London address. Maxwell-Scott also called Shand Kydd at his country house near Leighton Buzzard and told him about the letters, prompting Shand Kydd to drive to London to collect them. After reading them, and noting that they were bloodstained, he took them to Ranson.

7th Nov. 1974

Dear Bill,
The most ghastly circumstances arose tonight which I briefly described to my mother. When I interrupted the fight at Lower Belgrave St. and the man left Veronica accused me of having hired him. I took her upstairs and sent Frances up to bed and tried to clean her up. She lay doggo for a bit and when I was in the bathroom left the house. The circumstantial evidence against me is strong in that V will say it was all my doing. I will also lie doggo for a bit but I am only concerned for the children If you can manage it I want them to live with you – Coutts (Trustees) St Martins Lane (Mr Wall) will handle school fees. V. has demonstrated her hatred for me in the past and would do anything to see me accused For George and Frances to go through life knowing their father had stood in the dock for attempted murder would be too much. When they are old enough to understand, explain to them the dream of paranoia, and look after them.
Yours ever
John

FINANCIAL MATTERS

There is a sale coming up at Christies 27 Nov which will satisfy bank overdrafts. Please agree reserves with Tom Craig.
Proceeds to go to:
Lloyds: 6 Pall Mall,
Coutts, 59, Strand,
Nat West, Bloomsbury Branch,
who also hold an Eq. and Law Life Policy.
The other creditors can get lost for the time being.
Lucky

When asked why she did not immediately inform the police of Lucan's presence, Susan said she had not seen any newspapers or television news, or listened to any radio broadcasts, that might have warned her of the importance of his visit. Meanwhile, Lucan's children were taken by their aunt, Lady Sarah Gibbs, to her home in Guilsborough, Northamptonshire, where they remained for several weeks. On the day Veronica was discharged from hospital, a High Court hearing confirmed that the children could return to live with her. Repeated press intrusions later forced the family to move to a friend's home in Plymouth.

The Ford Corsair that Lucan had been seen driving, and whose details had the previous day been circulated across the country, was found on 10 November in Norman Road, Newhaven, about 16 miles (26 km) from Uckfield. In its boot was a piece of lead pipe covered in surgical tape and a full bottle of vodka. The car was removed for forensic examination. Later statements from two witnesses suggest that it was parked there sometime between 5:00 am and 8:00 am on the morning of 8 November. Its owner, Michael Stoop, also received a letter from Lucan, delivered to his club, the St James's. However, Stoop threw the envelope away and it was therefore not possible to check its postmark to see from where it had been sent.

My Dear Michael,
I have had a traumatic night of unbelievable coincidence. However I won't bore you with anything or involve you except to say that when you come across my children, which I hope you will, please tell them that you knew me and that all I cared about was them. The fact that a crooked solicitor and a rotten psychiatrist destroyed me between them will be of no importance to the children. I gave Bill Shand Kydd an account of what actually happened but judging by my last effort in court no-one, let alone a 67 year old judge – would believe – and I no longer care except that my children should be protected.
Yours ever,
John

Ranson suspected a suicide, but a thorough search of Newhaven Downs was judged impossible. A partial search was made using tracker dogs, but all that was found were the skeletal remains of a judge who had disappeared years earlier. Police divers searched the harbour, and a partial search using infrared photography was undertaken the following year, to no avail. A warrant for Lucan's arrest, to answer charges of murdering Rivett and attempting to murder his wife, was issued on 12 November. Descriptions of his appearance, already issued to police forces across the UK, were then issued to Interpol.

=== Forensic science ===
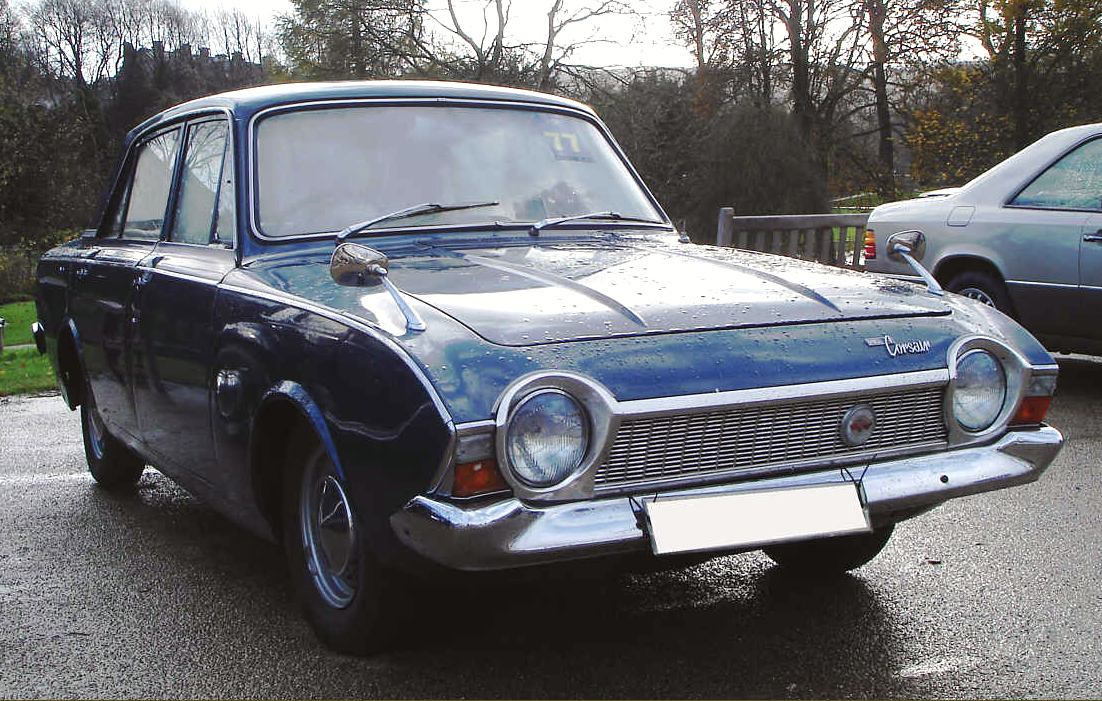
Lucan was last seen driving a Ford Corsair.

The scientific examination of the lead pipes found at the murder scene and in the Corsair's boot revealed traces of blood on the pipe from 46 Lower Belgrave Street. This proved to be a mixture of Veronica's (blood group A) and Rivett's (B) blood. Hair belonging to Veronica was also found on that pipe, but none belonging to Rivett. The pipe found inside the Corsair had neither blood nor hair on it. Home Office scientists were unable to prove conclusively that both pipes were cut from the same longer piece of piping, although they thought it likely.

The tape wrapped around both was similar, but those too could not be conclusively linked. The letters written to Kydd were stained with blood considered to be from both women. The letter to Stoop had no blood on it, but it was later proven that the paper it was written on had been torn from a writing pad found in the Corsair's boot.

An examination of the blood stains found inside 46 Lower Belgrave Street demonstrated that Rivett had been attacked in the basement kitchen, while Veronica had been attacked at the top of the basement stairs. The blood stains found inside the Corsair were of the AB blood group; the report concluded that this might have been a mixture of blood from both women. Hair similar to Veronica was also found inside the car.

=== Media reaction ===
By the afternoon of 8 November, the newspapers' early editions carried photographs of the Lucans across their front pages, accompanied by headlines like "Body in sack ... countess runs out screaming" and "Belgravia murder – earl sought". A meeting that day at the Clermont between Aspinall, Meinertzhagen, Kydd, Elwes, Charles Benson, and Stephen Raphael became the cause of much press speculation. Meinertzhagen and Raphael later insisted that the gathering was merely a rational discussion between concerned friends, keen to share anything they knew about what had happened, but the relationship between the Metropolitan Police and Lucan's social circle was strained; some officers complained that an "Eton mafia" worked against them.

Susan Maxwell-Scott refused to add to her statement, and when Aspinall's mother, Lady Osborne, was asked if she could help locate Lucan's body, she replied, "The last I heard of him, he was being fed to the tigers at my son's zoo", prompting the police to search the house and the animal cages there. Police searched 14 country houses and estates, including Holkham Hall and Warwick Castle, to no avail.

Amidst concerns expressed by the Labour MP Marcus Lipton that some people were "being a bit snooty" with the police, Benson wrote a letter to the editor of The Times asking him to either identify those people or "kindly withdraw his remarks". To its cost, the satirical magazine Private Eye accused Goldsmith of being at the Clermont meeting, when he was actually in Ireland. Elwes went to see Veronica in hospital and was reportedly deeply shocked both by her appearance and her statement, "Who's the mad one now?" He was apparently unhappy at some of the negative press coverage of Veronica, and was later ostracised by his friends for his part in an article critical of Lucan, which appeared in The Sunday Times Magazine. He died by suicide in September 1975.

Rivett's case made headlines around the world. Within days of the murder, newspapers reported on Veronica's statement to the police, with claims that she had pretended to collude with her husband to ensure her safety. In January 1975, Veronica gave an exclusive interview to the Daily Express. She also appeared in a murder reconstruction in the same newspaper, complete with posed photographs taken inside the house.

=== Inquest ===
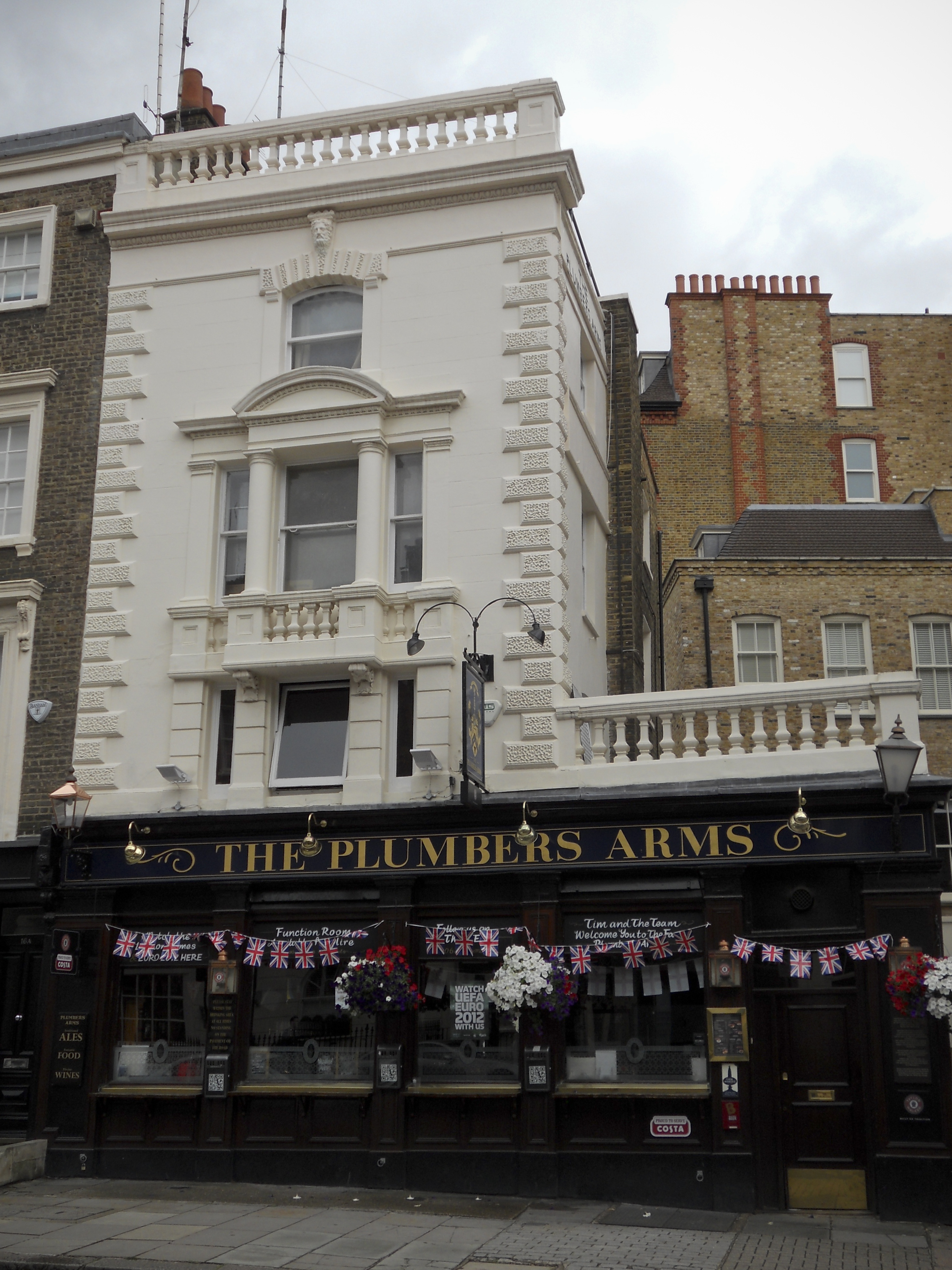
The Plumbers Arms public house, pictured in 2012

The inquest into Rivett's death opened on 13 November 1974 and was led by the coroner for inner west London, Gavin Thurston. Two witnesses were called to the packed courtroom, Roger Rivett, who confirmed that he had identified his wife's body, and the pathologist Keith Simpson, who confirmed that Rivett had died from being hit on the head with a blunt instrument. At Ranson's request, the hearing was then adjourned. Further adjournments were made on 11 December 1974 and 10 March 1975, before a full inquest was scheduled for 16 June 1975. (Note: Thurston was concerned about holding a full inquest before a trial had been held. The law at the time considered that a wife was usually neither "compellable nor competent" to testify against her husband in a criminal trial. She could tell the jury how she was attacked, but not anything about Rivett's death, or his "confession" after the fact. Her attack would also have to be heard before a different jury, in a different trial to the murder case. While these rules did not apply to an inquest, enabling her to speak freely, her evidence might prejudice any future trial. Furthermore, hearsay evidence was banned from criminal trials but not from inquests.)

The hearing began with introductions from various legal representatives, including a lawyer hired for Lucan by his mother. Thurston introduced the jury to the case and explained their duties. He had selected 33 witnesses to be called over the following few days, including Veronica, who each day wore a dark coat and white headscarf. Thurston questioned her on her relationship with Lucan, her marriage, her financial affairs, her employment of Rivett and what had happened on the night of the attack.

Lucan's mother's Queen's Counsel attempted to ask Veronica about the nature of their relationship or whether she hated her husband, but Thurston ruled his line of questioning inadmissible. Detective Constable Sally Blower, who had taken a statement from Frances on 20 November 1974, read the young girl's words to the court. Frances had heard a scream, and a few minutes later had watched as her mother (blood on her face) and father had entered the room. Her mother had then sent her to bed. She later heard her father calling for her mother, asking where she was, and watched as he left the bathroom and walked downstairs. She also described how Rivett did not normally work on Thursday nights.

The landlord of the Plumbers Arms pub described how Veronica had entered his bar covered "head to toe in blood" before she fell into "a state of shock". He claimed that she shouted "Help me, help me, I've just escaped from being murdered!", and "My children, my children, he's murdered my nanny!" Simpson outlined his post-mortem examination, concluding that death was caused by "blunt head injuries" and "inhalation of blood". He confirmed that the lead pipe found at the scene was most likely responsible for Rivett's injuries; some injuries, to the left eye and mouth, he thought more likely to have been caused by punches from a clenched fist.

The last person to confirm seeing Lucan alive, Susan Maxwell-Scott, told the court that he looked "dishevelled", and his hair "a little ruffled". His trousers had a damp patch on the right hip. Lucan had told her that he was walking or passing by the Lower Belgrave Street when he saw Veronica being attacked by a man. He let himself in but slipped in a pool of blood at the bottom of the stairs. He told Maxwell-Scott that the attacker ran off, and that Veronica was "very hysterical" and accused him of having hired a hitman to kill her.

I will record that Sandra Eleanor Rivett died from head injuries, that at 10:30 pm on 7 November 1974 she was found dead at 46 Lower Belgrave Street ... and that the following offence was committed by Richard John Bingham, Earl of Lucan – namely the offence of murder.

— Gavin Thurston

Once the hearing had ended, Thurston made a summary of the evidence presented and told the jury their options. At 11:45 am, their foreman announced "Murder by Lord Lucan". Lucan became the first member of the House of Lords to be named a murderer since 1760, when Laurence Shirley, 4th Earl Ferrers, was hanged for killing his bailiff. He was also the last person to be committed by a coroner to the Crown Court for unlawful killing; the coroner's power to do so was removed by the Criminal Law Act 1977.

Rivett's body, which had been held for several weeks following the murder, was released to her family and cremated at Croydon crematorium on 18 December 1974. A police spokesman cited Veronica's desire not to upset the family as a reason for her non-attendance at the cremation.

=== Lucan's defence ===
Lucan's friends and family were critical of the inquest, which they felt offered a one-sided view of events. His mother told reporters that it did not serve "any useful purpose at all". Veronica's sister, Christina, said that she felt "great sadness and sorrow" at the verdict. Susan Maxwell-Scott continued to press Lucan's claims of innocence and claimed to feel "awfully sorry" for Veronica.

However, as Lucan remained absent, his description of "a traumatic night of unbelievable coincidence" came only from the letters he wrote and the people he spoke with soon after Rivett's murder. While his fingerprints were not found at the scene, his assertions made no provision for the lead pipe discovered in the boot of the Corsair, the claims by some that he discussed murdering his wife, or the lack of a viable suspect for the man he claimed to have seen fighting her. (Note: A former boxer named Michael Fitzpatrick later claimed to know the unidentified person, but later still admitted inventing the tale. He was convicted of wasting police time.) No sign of a forced entry was found, and officers attempting to demonstrate that Lucan could have seen into the basement kitchen from the street could do so only by stooping low to the pavement.

The light in the basement of 46 Lower Belgrave Street was not working, making it even more difficult to see into the room; its lightbulb (which was tested and found to be in working order) was found removed from its holder and left lying on a chair. Furthermore, Veronica claimed not to have entered the basement that night, contradicting Lucan's version of events; her account was supported by the forensic examination made of the blood splashes and stains around the property.

Some traces of Veronica's blood were found in the basement, the rear garden and on the canvas sack used to store Rivett's body; this may have been due to contamination at the scene. The man Lucan claimed to have seen could not have left through the basement's front door as it was locked, and the rear door led to a walled garden through which no trace of an escape was found. No signs that the man left by the ground-level front door were discovered, and no witnesses reported seeing any such person near 46 Lower Belgrave Street.

In contrast to his defenders, the national press were almost unanimous in their condemnation of Lucan. Their leader-writers ignored the risk of libel and identified him as Rivett's killer.

== Bankruptcy and estate ==
Be it known that the Right Honourable Richard John Bingham, Seventh Earl of Lucan, of 72a Elizabeth Street, London SW1, died on or since the 8th day of November 1974.

— Probate document, 1999

As Lucan's bankruptcy proceeded, in August 1975 his creditors were informed that he had unsecured debts of £45,000 and preferential liabilities for £1,326. His assets were estimated at £22,632. The family silver was sold in March 1976 for around £30,000. His remaining debts were repaid by the Lucan family trust in the years immediately following his disappearance.

Lucan was presumed dead in chambers on 11 December 1992, and was declared legally dead on 27 October 1999. His family was granted probate over his estate, but no death certificate was issued, and his heir, George Bingham, was refused permission to take his father's title and seat in the House of Lords. (Note: Most hereditary peers lost their seats under the House of Lords Act 1999. They elected a subset of their membership who would continue to sit until 2026. George Bingham was ineligible to vote or stand in the initial election in 1999, or by-elections until 2016.) Following the passage of the Presumption of Death Act 2013, Bingham began a new attempt to have his father declared dead, which proved successful with a High Court decision on 3 February 2016. He therefore inherited the title, becoming the 8th Earl of Lucan.

== Aftermath and developments ==
"He was not pronounced dead so we could pay for the children's education, that was the reason it took so long. If his body was found my son would have been the Earl of Lucan and we would have to pay death duties. We would not have been able to pay for the children's education. They were only four, seven and 10 so there was a lot of time ahead."

— Dowager Countess of Lucan

The last confirmed sighting of Lucan was by Susan Maxwell-Scott as he left the Maxwell-Scott property in Stoop's Ford Corsair, and his fate is unknown. Ranson initially claimed that Lucan had "done the honourable thing" and "fallen on his own sword", a view repeated by many of Lucan's friends, including Aspinall, who said that he believed that Lucan was guilty of Rivett's murder and that he had committed suicide by scuttling his motorboat and jumping into the English Channel with a stone tied to his body. Veronica believed that her husband had killed himself "like the nobleman he was".

Ranson later changed his view, explaining that he considered it more likely that suicide was far from Lucan's thoughts, that a drowning at sea was implausible, and that Lucan had moved to southern Africa. A detective who led a new investigation into Lucan's disappearance 32 years after the murder told the Telegraph that "the evidence points towards the fact that Lord Lucan left the country and lived abroad for a number of years". Susan Maxwell-Scott told author John Pearson that Lucan might have been helped out of the country by shadowy underground financiers before being judged too great a risk, killed, and buried in Switzerland. Advertising executive Jeremy Scott proposed a similar theory, as he was familiar with some of the Clermont Set.

Lucan's disappearance has captivated the public's imagination for decades, with alleged sightings reported around the world. One of the earliest such sightings occurred shortly after the murder, but it turned out to be British politician John Stonehouse, who had attempted to fake his own death. The police travelled to France in June the following year to hunt another lead, to no avail. A sighting in Colombia turned out to be an American businessman.

John Miller, a bounty hunter who had previously kidnapped fugitive train robber Ronnie Biggs, claimed to have captured Lucan in 1982, but was later exposed by the News of the World as a hoaxer. In 2003, a former Scotland Yard detective thought that he had tracked Lucan to Goa, India, but the man he traced was actually Barry Halpin, a folk singer from Merseyside. In 2007, reporters in New Zealand interviewed a homeless British expatriate who neighbours claimed was Lucan.

George Bingham responded to claims that the two eldest Lucan children were sent to Gabon in the early 1980s so that their father might secretly watch them "from a distance" and denied ever visiting the country. Veronica dismissed the newspaper claims of sightings as "nonsense", reiterating that her husband "was not the sort of Englishman to cope abroad". George and his sister Lady Camilla are not convinced that their father was responsible for Rivett's death.

Following the murder, Veronica fell into an addiction to antidepressant drugs, resulting in her children being fostered by her in-laws, the Shand Kydds, in 1982. She remained estranged from her children for the remainder of her life. Veronica died by suicide on 26 September 2017, believing she had undiagnosed Parkinson's disease. She stated in her will that she was leaving all her money to Shelter because of her children's "lack of good manners", having not spoken to them since the 1980s. Her son George commented: "I applaud the decision".

In 2020, a sighting of Lucan was reported in Australia; a pensioner living in suburban Brisbane was alleged to be Lucan by Professor Hassan Ugail, a leading computer scientist. Ugail claimed that facial recognition technology had positively identified the man as Lucan. The man, who lives in what was described as a Buddhist commune in Brisbane's outer suburbs, was found by Rivett's son, Neil Berriman, and is reportedly the same age as Lucan. However, "an earlier report by another facial recognition firm, Acumé Forensic, based in Leeds, concluded that Lucan and the man in Australia were not" the same person, and "in April 2021, following extensive inquiries and investigations made by the Australian federal police on behalf of the Metropolitan police, the person was conclusively eliminated from the investigation."

The inquiry into Rivett's death remains open.

The 17-year investigation by Neil Berriman, assisted by investigative journalist Glen Campbell, is the subject of the three-part documentary series Lucan, broadcast by the BBC in November 2024. Campbell interviews an unnamed woman, claiming to have been Aspinall's secretary, who recounts arranging a visit for the children to "Treetops" in Kenya, to enable Lucan to see them "from a distance". She claims to have personally spoken with Lucan, by telephone, to confirm the arrangements. The documentary concludes with the Brisbane pensioner being named as Derek Crowther, now going by the name Christopher Newman, who had performed in the production of the show Facade in Canada under the names Peter Jason/Jenny Romain in July 1969, five years before the murder, casting doubt on the belief that he is Lucan. (Note: The title card at the end of the programme reads as follows: "The old man, Christopher, has since chosen to share further details about his life. In his 20s, he also went by the name Pierre Johannsen. He was conceived on Halloween 1935 at a magical ritual at Stonehenge. His father's name on his birth certificate is not his real father. His biological father was a puppeteer who performed for the young Princesses Elizabeth and Margaret at Buckingham Palace. Christopher acknowledges that Neil still thinks he may be Lord Lucan.")

Writer Laura Thompson developed some speculative theories involving long-disputed rumours about the Lucan marriage, which persisted for years. In a 2024 article, Thompson proposed a theory that Veronica herself killed Rivett and framed her husband, drawing conclusions from tenuous circumstantial evidence such as Veronica's mental state, the presence of a small amount of her blood at the murder scene, and a medical doctor's testimony that it was possible, though unlikely, that Veronica's head injuries could have been self-inflicted. Thompson also wrote that Veronica was described by her sister as "a consummate actress".

== In popular culture ==
The 1994 alternative history TV film The Trial of Lord Lucan, starring Julian Wadham as Lucan, Lynsey Baxter as Veronica, and Jan Ruppe as Rivett, depicts what might have happened had Lucan been arrested in Newhaven and stood trial for Rivett's murder.

The 1998 film Bloodlines: Legacy of a Lord starring Richard Lintern as Lucan, Elizabeth Garvie as Veronica, Liz Cuti as Rivett, Brian Doherty as Rivett's boyfriend, John Hankins, and Jack Toner as Rivett's child, depicts theories regarding Lucan's involvement in the murder and fate.

The 2000 novel Aiding and Abetting by Muriel Spark is a fictional account of the aftermath of the Rivett murder and Lucan's escape. Spark wrote: "The seventh Lord Lucan, by all reports, was a very boring man. That was the point I kept in my mind when I wrote Aiding and Abetting, a fictionalised account of Lucan's post-murderous wanderings."

In early drafts for the 2006 adaptation of Casino Royale the film began with James Bond backpacking in Madagascar and playing chess with a drunk man hinted to be an escaped Lucan living in Africa.

A two-part miniseries, Lucan, was broadcast on ITV in December 2013. It was adapted from John Pearson's book The Gamblers and was written and produced by Jeff Pope. Rory Kinnear plays Lucan, Catherine McCormack stars as Veronica and Leanne Best as Rivett.

In 2024, BBC Radio 4's The History Podcast aired a ten-part series entitled The Lucan Obsession, presented by Alex von Tunzelmann.

The 2025 mystery novel The Game is Murder by Hazell Ward is heavily based on the murder and comments on its popular perception.

== See also ==
- List of fugitives from justice who disappeared

== Bibliography ==
- Green, Jennifer; Green, Michael (2006), Dealing with Death: A Handbook of Practices, Procedures and Law, Jessica Kingsley Publishers, ISBN 978-1-84310-381-3
- Moore, Sally (1987), Lucan: Not Guilty, Sidgwick & Jackson Limited, ISBN 978-0-283-99536-1
- Pearson, John (2007), The Gamblers, Arrow Books, ISBN 978-0-09-946118-0
- Ranson, Roy; Strange, Robert (1994), Looking for Lucan, Smith Gryphon Limited, ISBN 978-1-85685-069-8
- Scott, Jeremy (2002), Fast and Louche, Profile Books, ISBN 978-1-86197-428-0

Peerage of Ireland
Preceded by George Bingham	Earl of Lucan; 1964–2016	Succeeded by George Bingham
