= George Bingham, 8th Earl of Lucan =

British hereditary peer (born 1967)

The Right Honourable The Earl of Lucan
- 8th Earl of Lucan
- Arms of Bingham: Azure, a bend plain cottised between six crosses patée or
- Predecessor: The 7th Earl of Lucan
- Other titles: 4th Baron Bingham (UK); 8th Baron Lucan (IRE); 14th Baronet of Castlebar (NS)
- Born: George Charles Bingham; 21 September 1967 (age 58); London, England
- Residence: Belgravia, London
- Spouse: Anne-Sofie Foghsgaard (m. 2016)
- Issue: 2, including Charles Lars John Bingham, Lord Bingham
- Parents: The 7th Earl of Lucan; Veronica Mary Duncan
- Occupation: Banker

George Charles Bingham, 8th Earl of Lucan (born 21 September 1967), styled Lord Bingham until 2016, is a British hereditary peer.

== Background and early life ==
George Charles Bingham, 8th Earl of Lucan, was born on 21 September 1967, the only son of Richard John Bingham, 7th Earl of Lucan, and Veronica Mary Duncan.

He is the thrice great-grandson of Field Marshal The 3rd Earl of Lucan, who is remembered for his role in the Crimean War, leading the cavalry division which included the Heavy Brigade and the Light Brigade, the latter of which was involved in the Charge of the Light Brigade. The Binghams are an Anglo-Irish aristocratic family.

Lucan was educated at Eton College and Trinity Hall, Cambridge. He married Anne-Sofie Foghsgaard (known as "Fie"; b. 1977) at St George's, Hanover Square, London, on 14 January 2016. She is the daughter of Danish industrialist Lars Foghsgaard, the former owner of the Spott Estate in East Lothian, Scotland. They have two children, a daughter, Lady Daphne, born in 2017, and a son, Lord Bingham (Charles Lars John), born in 2020. Lady Lucan is a fashion designer.

Lord Lucan has two sisters: Lady Frances Bingham (born 1964), and Lady Camilla Bloch KC (born 1970), who married Michael Bloch KC in 1998.

Lucan's father, the 7th Earl, disappeared in November 1974 after the murder of the family nanny Sandra Rivett. The 8th Earl and his sister Lady Camilla say that they are not convinced that their father was responsible for Rivett's death.

== Succession ==
In the 1990s, the Probate Registry (a division of the High Court of Justice) gave leave for the 7th Earl to be sworn dead by his trustees, and the family was granted probate over his estate in 1999, but no death certificate was issued. In 1998, Lord Bingham, as he then was styled, supported by sworn statements from his entire living family save for his mother, and by the Metropolitan Police, applied for his father to be declared dead for House of Lords purposes. The Lord Chancellor, Lord Irvine of Lairg, decided he was unable to issue Bingham his writ of summons to the Lords without a death certificate for his father. In October 2015, twelve months after the Presumption of Death Act 2013 came into effect, Bingham sought for his father to be declared dead at the General Register Office (GRO), which issues death certificates; in this case, an application to the High Court was necessary. On 3 February 2016, a judge declared the GRO could issue the certificate, allowing Bingham to inherit the peerages.

On 23 May 2016, Lucan petitioned the House of Lords to have his succession recognised. On 7 June, the House declared that he had established his claims to the titles, and he was directed to be entered on the register of hereditary peers maintained in connection with the House of Lords Act 1999 by virtue of his subsidiary title Baron Bingham in the Peerage of the United Kingdom. As of March 2018, he had not stood in the internal Lords by-elections for replacing of the 92 electable hereditary representative peers (upon their retirements or deaths).

Peerage of Ireland
| Preceded by John Bingham | Earl of Lucan; 2016–present | Incumbent |
