= Veronica Bingham, Countess of Lucan =

Wife of the 7th Earl of Lucan (1937–2017)

The Right Honourable The Countess of Lucan
- John and Veronica in 1963
- Born: Veronica Mary Duncan; 3 May 1937; Uckfield, Sussex, England
- Died: 26 September 2017 (aged 80); London, England
- Cause of death: Suicide
- Spouse: John Bingham, 7th Earl of Lucan (m. 1963; sep. 1973)
- Issue: 3, including George Bingham, 8th Earl of Lucan and Camilla Bloch

Veronica Mary Bingham, Countess of Lucan (née Duncan; 3 May 1937 – 26 September 2017), commonly known as Lady Lucan, was the wife of Anglo-Irish peer John Bingham, 7th Earl of Lucan.

She became widely known following the events of 1974, when her husband allegedly attacked her and the family's nanny. Veronica survived the attack, but the nanny, Sandra Rivett, was killed. John disappeared shortly afterwards, and his fate remains unknown.

== Biography ==
Veronica Mary Duncan was born on 3 May 1937 in Uckfield, East Sussex, to Major Charles Moorhouse Duncan and Thelma Watt. Her parents divorced when she was young, and she and her sister, Christina, had a challenging childhood. In her early 20s, Veronica moved to London, where she worked as a photographic assistant. She married John Bingham, 7th Earl of Lucan, in 1963 and became the Countess of Lucan. The couple had three children. The marriage faced difficulties, and by January 1973 they were separated.

== Murder of Sandra Rivett ==
On 7 November 1974, Sandra Rivett, the family's nanny, was found murdered in their home. Veronica was also attacked but managed to escape and informed the authorities that her husband was the assailant. John disappeared shortly afterwards and, despite extensive searches, was never found. His fate remains unknown.

== Aftermath and later life ==
=== Immediate aftermath ===
Following the 1974 attack at her Belgravia home, Veronica sustained injuries from the attack. John's disappearance left her in a state of uncertainty and exposed her to intense public and media scrutiny as she dealt with the aftermath.

Veronica's life continued to attract press attention. In the years after the attack, she faced complex legal disputes, chiefly concerning the custody of her three children and her financial security. She initially lost custody to John's sister and brother‑in‑law, who argued that her fragile mental health made her unfit. After a lengthy legal process, she regained custody in 1982, when the courts ruled in her favour and deemed her capable of providing a stable home.

Financial matters relating to John's estate also proved difficult. His legal status remained unresolved for decades, preventing Veronica from receiving any widow's inheritance or estate benefits. In 1999, twenty‑five years after his disappearance, he was formally declared dead, allowing some financial resolution. The prolonged legal restrictions contributed to her reported financial difficulties in later life. Continued media interest and ongoing legal proceedings kept her under public scrutiny.

=== Isolation, and the ITV documentary ===
Estranged from many friends and family and with strained relationships with her children, Veronica reportedly lived a solitary life in the years after the attack. Her social circle diminished and she became a figure largely associated with the events of 1974. In 2017, she agreed to take part in an ITV documentary, My Husband, the Truth, in which she revisited her memories of the attack and discussed her marriage and her view of John's disappearance. Filmed shortly before her death, it was one of her final public reflections on her life and the case, during which she outlined her theories on John's fate and discussed the effect of the events of 1974 on her life.

== Death and legacy ==
Veronica died by suicide on 26 September 2017, aged 80. She believed she had Parkinson's disease, although she had not been diagnosed with the condition. Veronica told a friend that she was worried about her health and finances in the period leading up to her death. She owned books on suicide and had attended a meeting on assisted dying. An inquest found that she died from respiratory failure caused by alcohol and barbiturate poisoning.

In her will, Veronica left her entire estate to Shelter, a UK-based homeless charity.

=== Memoir ===
Veronica's memoir, A Moment in Time, was published in 2017, shortly after her death.

== Titles ==
- 1937–1961: Miss Veronica Duncan
- 1961–1963: Viscountess Bingham
- 1963–2016: The Right Honourable The Countess of Lucan
- 2016–2017: The Right Honourable The Dowager Countess of Lucan
